= Toulouse Cathedral =

Roman Catholic church in France

Cathedral of Saint Stephen Cathédrale Saint-Étienne
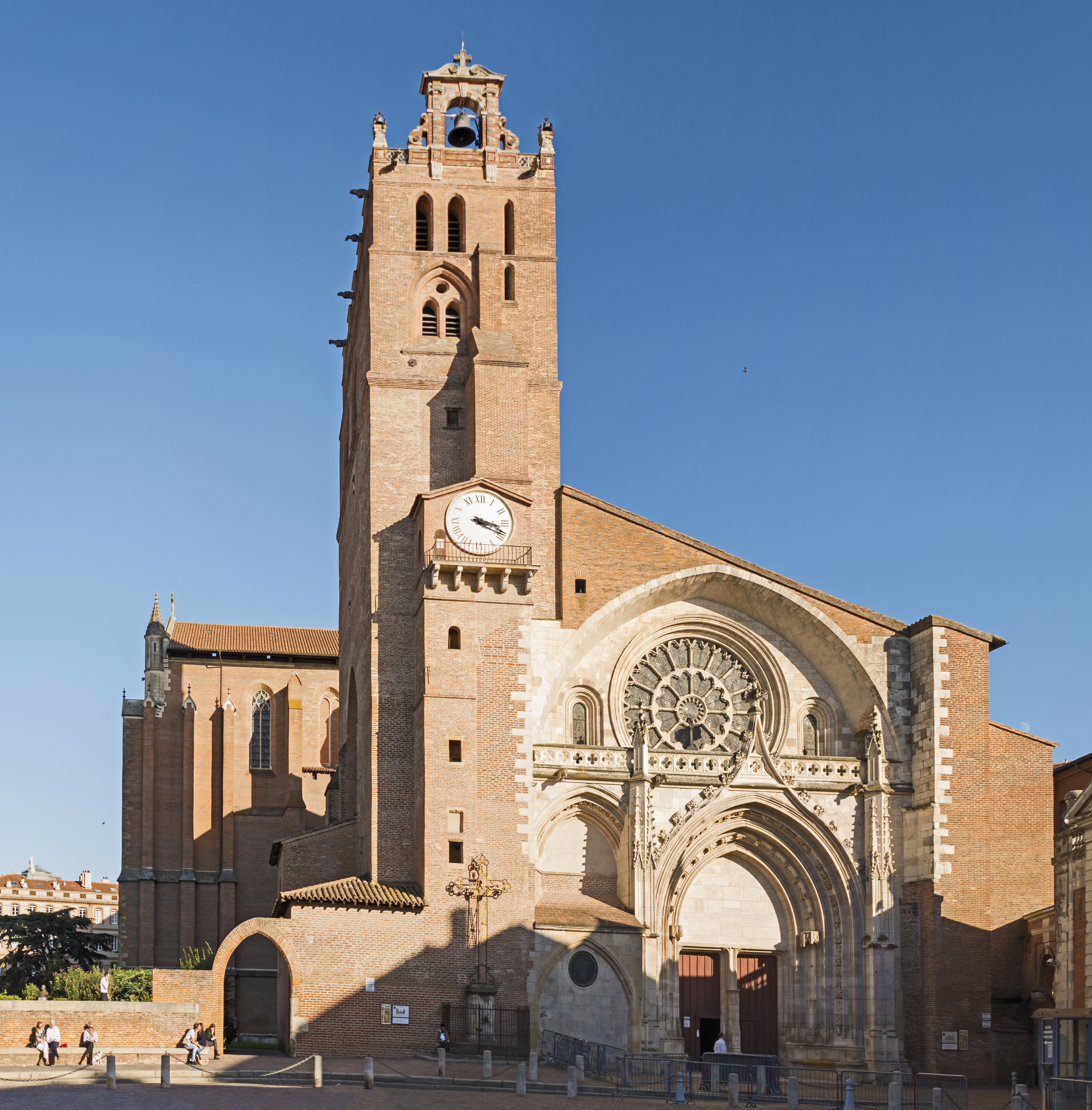
- Toulouse Cathedral in 2014

Religion
- Affiliation: Roman Catholic Church
- Diocese: Archdiocese of Toulouse
- Rite: Roman
- Ecclesiastical or organisational status: Cathedral

Location
- Location: Toulouse, France
- Interactive map of Cathedral of Saint Stephen; Cathédrale Saint-Étienne
- Coordinates: 43.5999°N 1.4504°E

Architecture
- Type: Church
- Style: Southern French Gothic, Gothic, Late Gothic (Flamboyant), Romanesque, Baroque

Website
- http://paroissescathedraletoulouse.fr/

Toulouse Cathedral (French: Cathédrale Saint-Étienne de Toulouse; Occitan: Catedrala Sant Estève de Tolosa) is a Roman Catholic church located in the city of Toulouse, France. The cathedral is a national monument, and is the seat of the Archbishop of Toulouse. It has been listed since 1862 as a monument historique by the French Ministry of Culture.

== History ==
=== The Romanesque cathedral (mostly replaced) ===
The cathedral is said to have been built atop the foundations of a chapel constructed in the 3rd century by Saint Saturnin, sent to Christianize the Gauls and martyred in Toulouse. It is said to have been reconstructed by Saint Exuperius, Bishop of Toulouse, one hundred and fifty years later. This first documented cathedral is recorded at the beginning of the 5th century, but nothing remains of the original building.

A Romanesque cathedral was constructed on the same site beginning in about 1078. The Romanesque structure was smaller than the present church; it was probably about twenty meters wide and 85 meters long. It probably had a massive west front with two towers, a nave with three vessels, and a chevet in three parts extending outwards. The lower portions had oculi at the west. It included works of classical sculpture, such as a votive altar, probably from an earlier church. Examples are now displayed in the Musée Saint-Raymond in Toulouse. This early building was probably begun by bishop Isarn (1071 to 1105), and was continued by his successor Amiel (1105 to 1139).

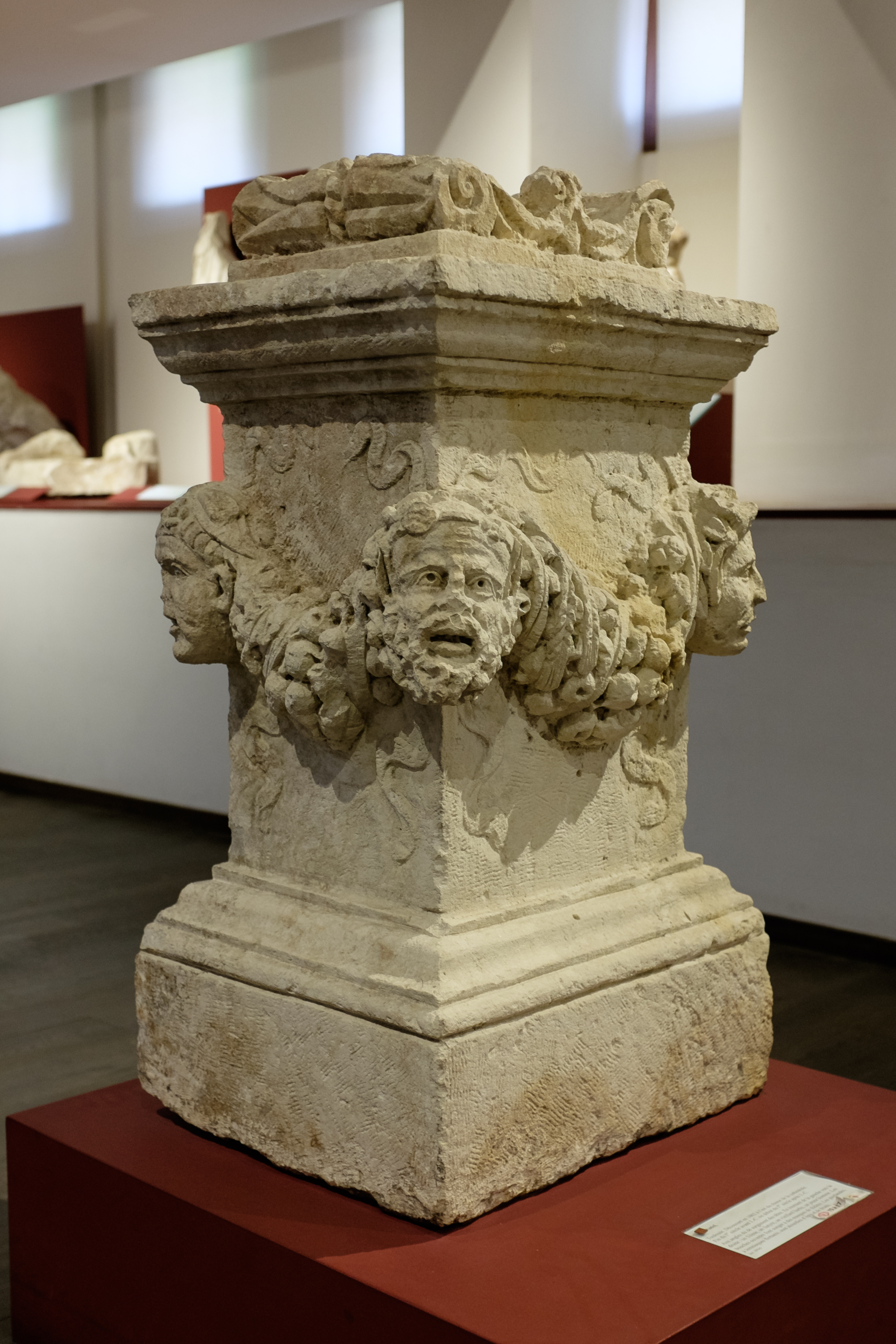
Altar sculpture predating cathedral (1st century AD)

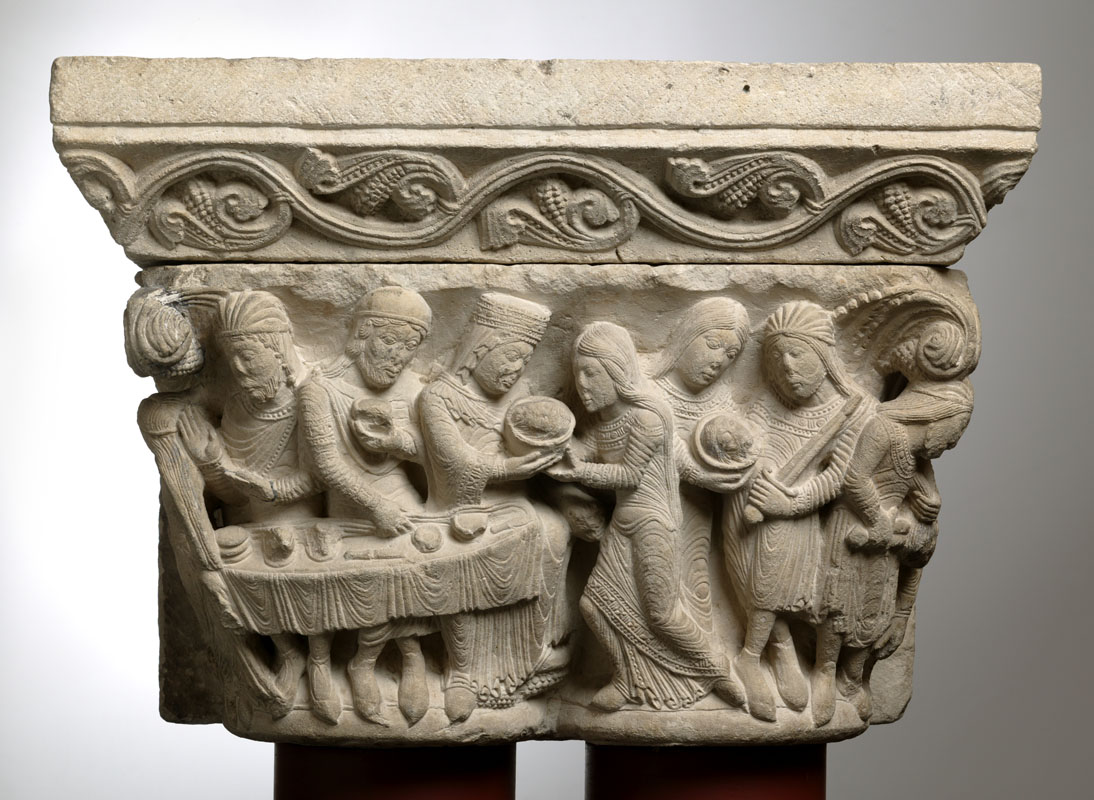
Feast of the Marriage at Cana depicted on a column capital from the Romanesque cathedral (1120–1140) (now in the Musée des Augustins, Toulouse)

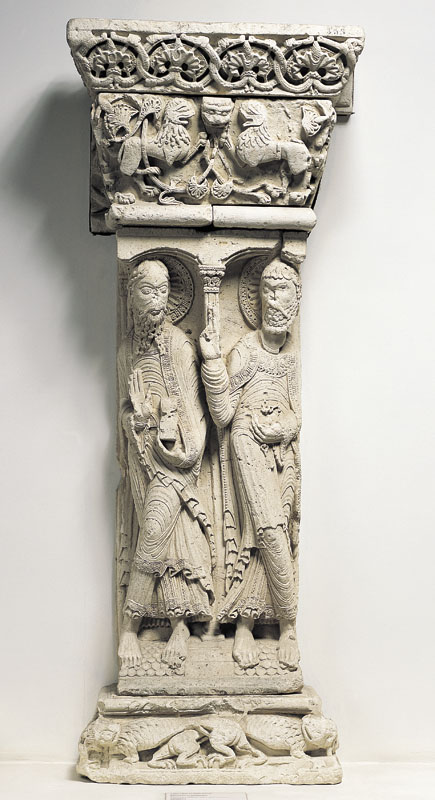
A column capital from the Romanesque cathedral (1120–1140)

=== 13th–16th century: two distinct Gothic styles ===
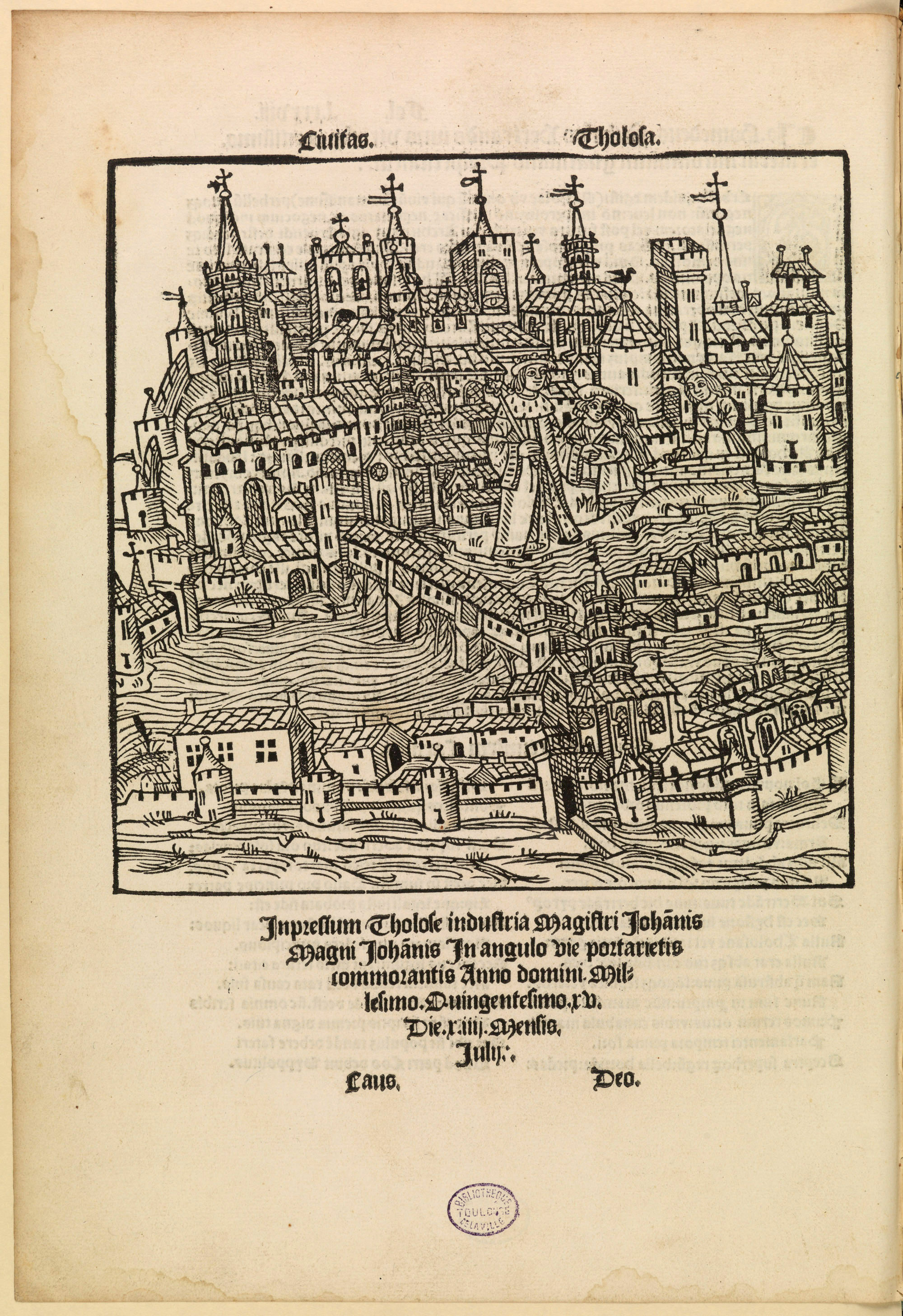
Engraving of Toulouse in 1515, with the cathedral among the churches at top center; the present tower was not yet built

At the beginning of the 13th century (1210–1220), as the church received several large donations, the nave was largely rebuilt atop the vestiges of the earlier cathedral. The style of the new nave is often called "Raymondine", for Raymond VI, Count of Toulouse. It was the first important example of southern French Gothic architecture. Most of the cathedral today dates from this period. The surviving Romanesque portions include the south wall of the choir and the partitions in the north and south of the present nave. Other surviving Romanesque features include the two oculi, or circular windows, and in a particular feature of southern Gothic, the walls are reinforced by massive buttresses against the wall, rather than the northern style of flying buttresses further away.

In 1271, with the death of the Count of Toulouse, the city and its province became part of the Kingdom of France. The new bishop, Bertrand de L'Isle-Jourdain, quickly adopted the High Gothic and Rayonnant style established in northern France. In about 1272, he commissioned a new architect, probably Jean Deschamps, who was building Narbonne Cathedral, to construct the new choir in the northern style. The new choir that he planned was entirely different from the earlier nave; it was much wider, and was set to one side, rather than on a straight axis with the nave. It was to be built and decorated largely with cut stone, like northern Gothic cathedrals, rather than brick. It was evident that the architect expected that the old nave would be demolished and rebuilt to match the style of the choir. However, the Bishop died in 1286, and financial and political difficulties intervened. The construction slowed down and stopped.

The southern side of the cathedral was finally finished in the first half of the 14th century. The successors to Bertrand de l'Isle completed the vaults of the chapel in at the end of the 15th century. But the new choir still did not yet have its overhead vaults in place, and the walls were completed only as high as the middle triforium level. Pierre de Moulin (1439–51) modified the grand portal of the nave, destroying the major part of the west front of the 13th century church. Archbishop Bernard de Rousergue (1451–1475) enlarged the choir to the northwest by adding a new chapel, the chapel of Purgatory, on the exterior (it was destroyed in the 20th century in the rebuilding of the surrounding structures). He also created the Chapel of the Agony on the south side, at the entrance of the nave. The keystone of the arches displays his emblem. At the end of the 15th century, the nave and choir were finally joined with the construction of the two new walls on the north side.

At the beginning of the 16th century, a new bishop, Jean d'Orléans, launched a series of major works. In 1518, he commissioned the construction of a sacristy on the northeast side of the choir. He also built the imposing brick clock tower on the north side of the west front. It was built atop a Romanesque foundation, and topped by a gabled belfry, completing the west front. He launched a program to complete the choir begun by Bertrand de l'Isle. To this end he raised the pillars and buttresses on the south side of the choir, with an abundance of decoration in the Flamboyant Gothic style.

In order to make a longer choir and create the space for a substantial transept, he ordered the construction of a massive pillar (now known as the d'Orléans pillar) to support the new structure. He extended the choir to the southwest, with the construction of the Chapel of Notre-Dame des Anges. The pillar was completed, but he died and the rest of project was left unfinished. Those entering the nave are faced, not with the altar, but with the gigantic pillar, and the incomplete transept.

=== 17th and 18th century ===
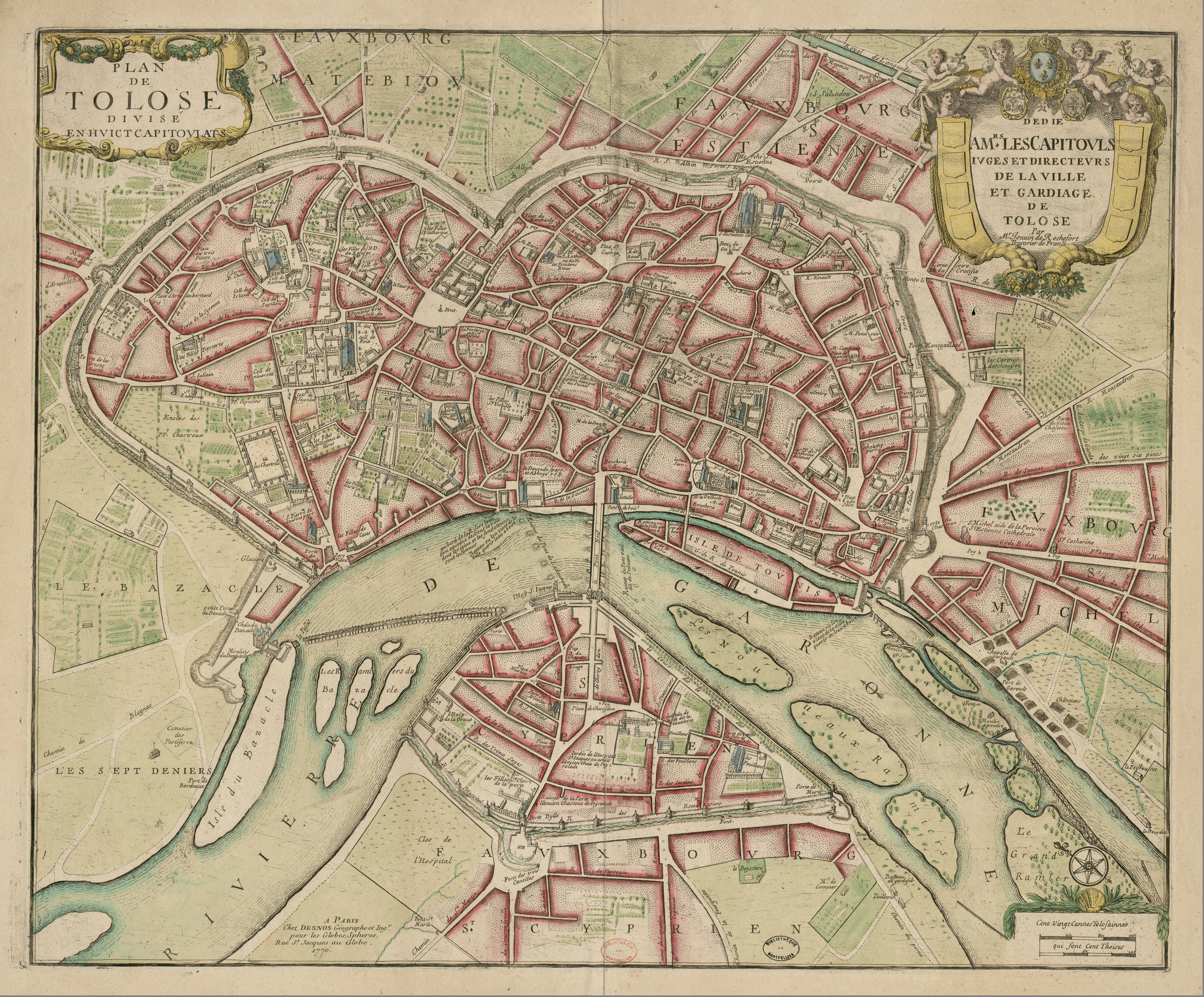
Plan of Toulouse in 1770; cathedral visible inside city wall at top right

On the night of 9–10 December 1609 a fire destroyed the temporary wooden roof of the choir and the furniture of the choir. The emotions caused by the fire inspired a fund-raising campaign from the public and local government to complete the cathedral. Pierre Levelville was the master builder of the new work. He added height to buttresses and put in place flying arches to support the higher walls and vaults. He completed he construction of the midlevel triforuim, and raised the vaults and walls of the choir to twenty-eight meters. This was less than the grand church planned by Bertrand de l'Isle, but the new exterior walls gave it the impression of greater height. He installed large windows in the upper choir, and decorated the walls and windows with Flamboyant tracery. The vaulting finally completed in 1611.

In the following years, the choir was extensively redecorated, with two new organs, choir stalls, and elaborate carved stone choir screens in the nave and choir. The new high altar of the choir, with its elaborate baroque sculpture by Gervais Drouet was installed between 1667 and 1670 The chapels around the choir were also redecorated in the last part of the 17th century with marble retables and paintings. The elaborate wrought iron choir screens of the choir were commissioned in 1764. The intent was to make the interior decoration more dramatic and appealing, in contrast with the austere interiors of Protestant churches.

In 1790, shortly after the outbreak of the French Revolution, the chapter of the choir was abolished, and a number of the funeral monuments in the interior were destroyed. In 1793, the nave was converted into a Temple of Reason. The retable of the parish altar was destroyed, and the sculpture of the portal was largely smashed. The sculpture of the tympanum depicting Christ blessing the world was replaced by a plaque declaring "Temple of Reason". The statues of the apostles, of Saint Stephen and of the Archbishops Pierre and Denis du Moulon were hammered to pieces. In 1794 and 1795, the cathedral served as a collection point for iron and other metal objects, notably the bells taken from all of the surrounding churches.

=== 19th century: Damages, restorations, and competing proposals ===
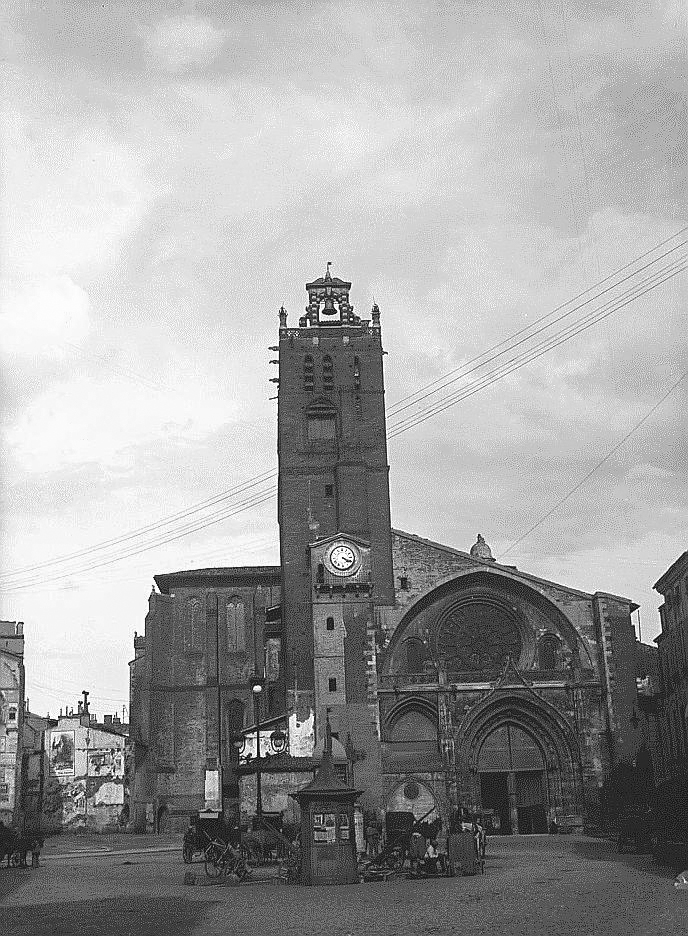
The cathedral in 1900

Following the French Revolution, the cathedral was formally returned to the Catholic Church on April 19, 1802. The subsequent century was marked by a series of damages, ongoing repairs, and intense debates over the building's future. The stained glass windows, destroyed during the Revolution, were gradually replaced. However, the new windows were damaged again by a hurricane in 1808, and in 1816, the cathedral suffered further damage from the explosion of a nearby powder magazine. Napoleon contributed a sum to restore the unfinished roof, while repairs to the pavement and walls continued intermittently.

The striking lack of unity between the nave and the choir led to numerous proposals for the cathedral's "completion". The most ambitious plans involved demolishing one of the two parts. One proposal suggested tearing down the 13th-century nave, while a competing proposal suggested demolishing the newer choir. Other projects proposed removing all 17th and 18th-century decoration to restore the building to a perceived original Gothic appearance.

Amidst these debates, several restoration campaigns were undertaken. The architect Auguste Virebent restored the Chapel of the Relics (1842–1847) and produced several designs for a new, unified cathedral in the prevailing neo-Gothic style. The architect Jacques Jean Esquié redecorated the choir chapels between 1848 and 1868. In the early 1850s, a more scientific program of restoration began, based on the methods being used on Notre-Dame de Paris. In 1864, Cardinal Deprez received permission to hold a lottery to raise money for the demolition of the old nave, but the plan was never carried out.

=== 20th century: Final unification ===
Ultimately, all radical proposals for demolition were abandoned in favor of a more conservative and pragmatic approach. In the early 20th century, a compromise proposed by the chief architect of Historic Monuments, Auguste Saint-Anne de Louzier, was accepted around 1911.

His solution was to preserve both historical parts of the cathedral while creating a more harmonious transition between them. This was achieved by prolonging the ambulatory on the north side of the choir and constructing a new 15th-century style portal on the side where the two structures met. As part of this project, the maze of buildings clustered against the cathedral was demolished and replaced with a public garden. This project respected the complex, layered history of the building and resulted in the unique configuration seen today.

== Exterior ==
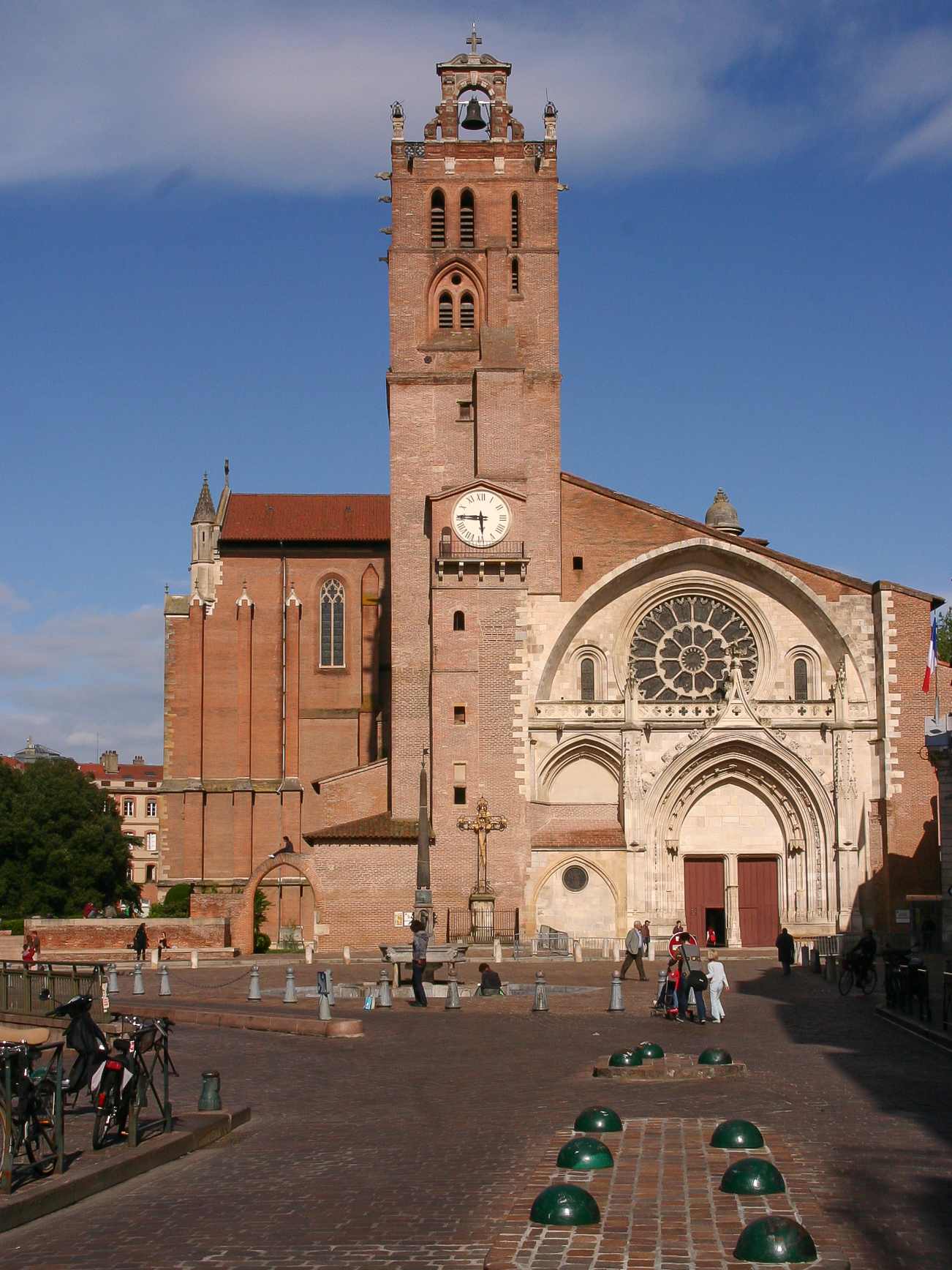
The west front and bell tower

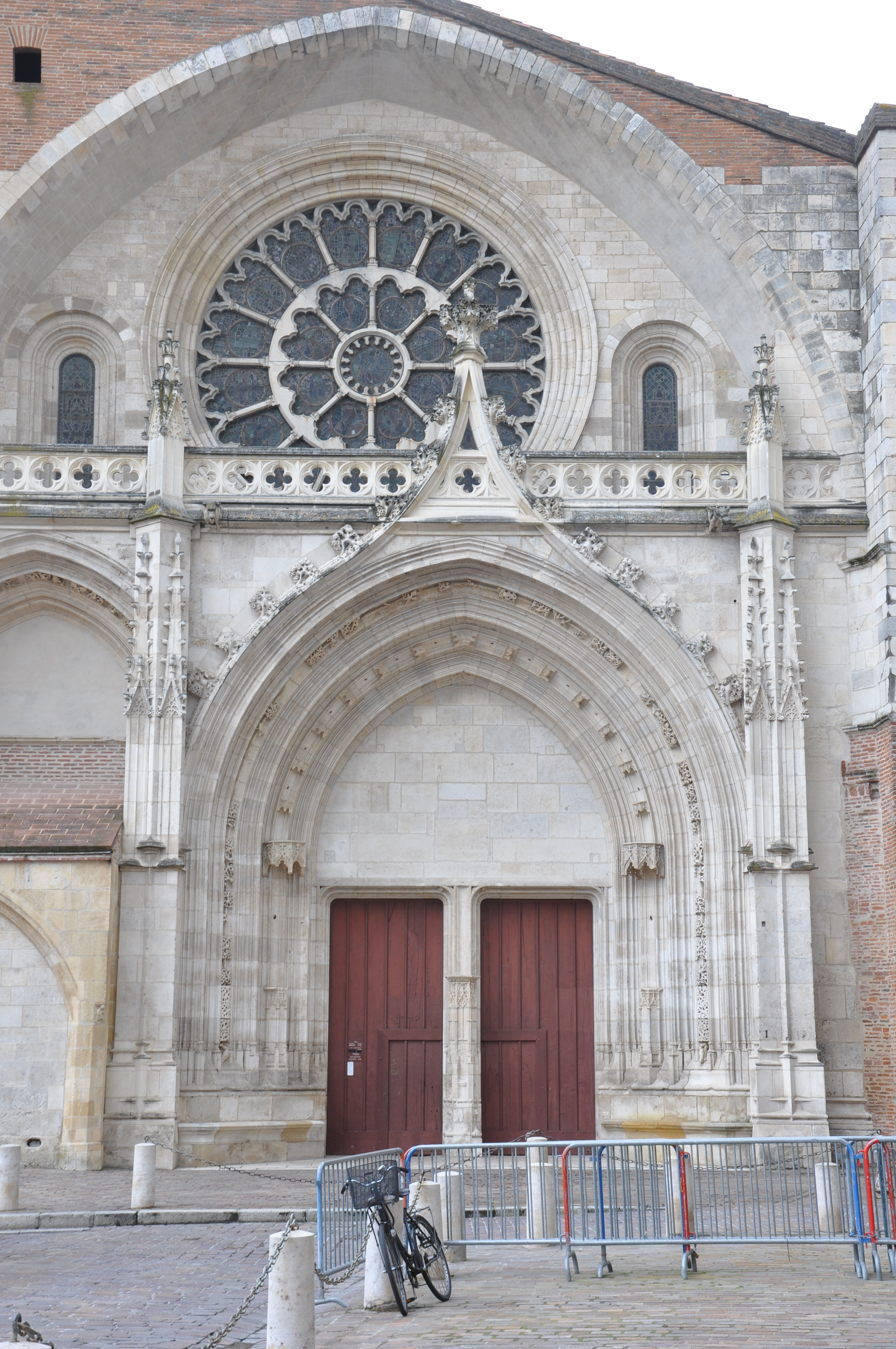
West portal and rose window (1230)

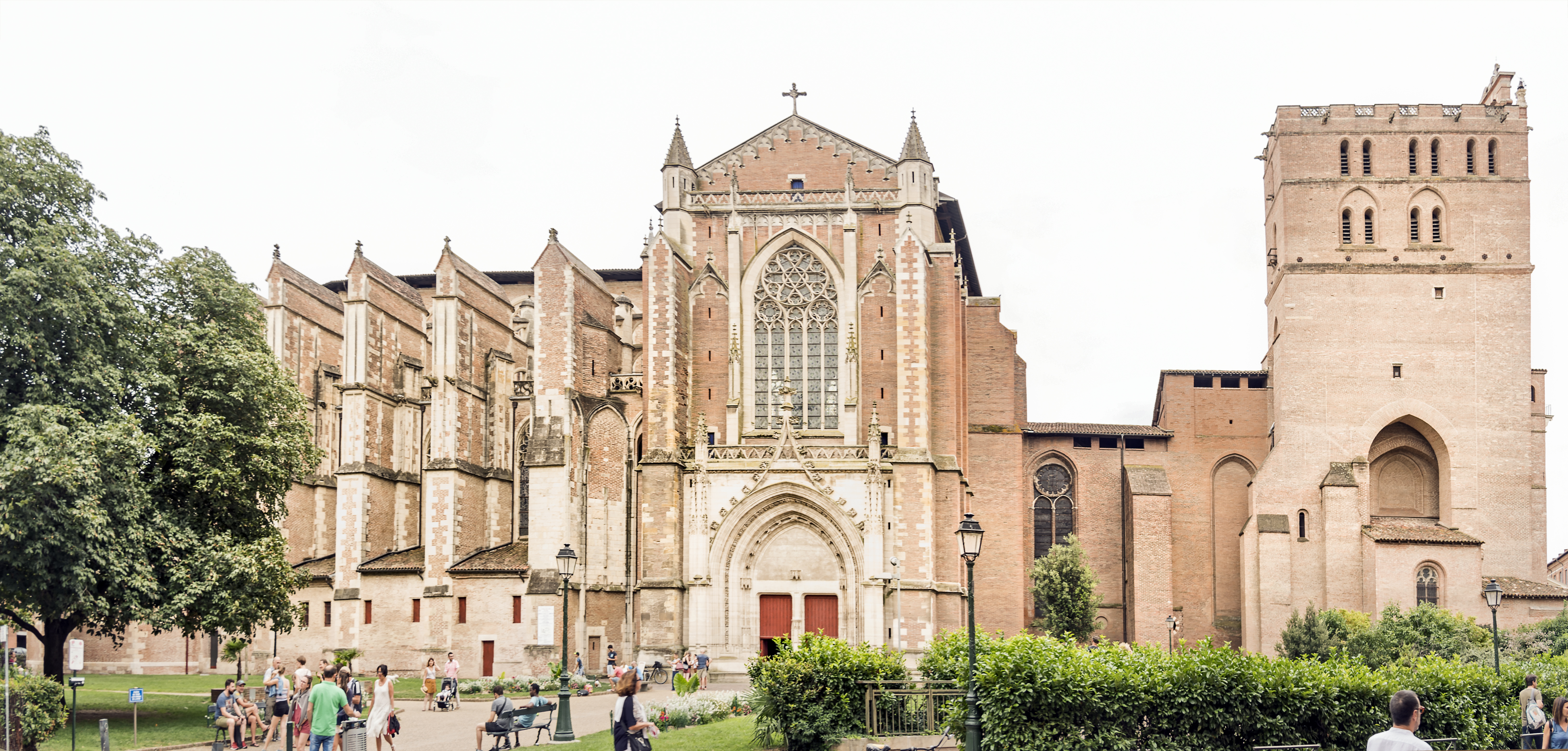
The north side of the cathedral, with the transept, with flamboyant portal

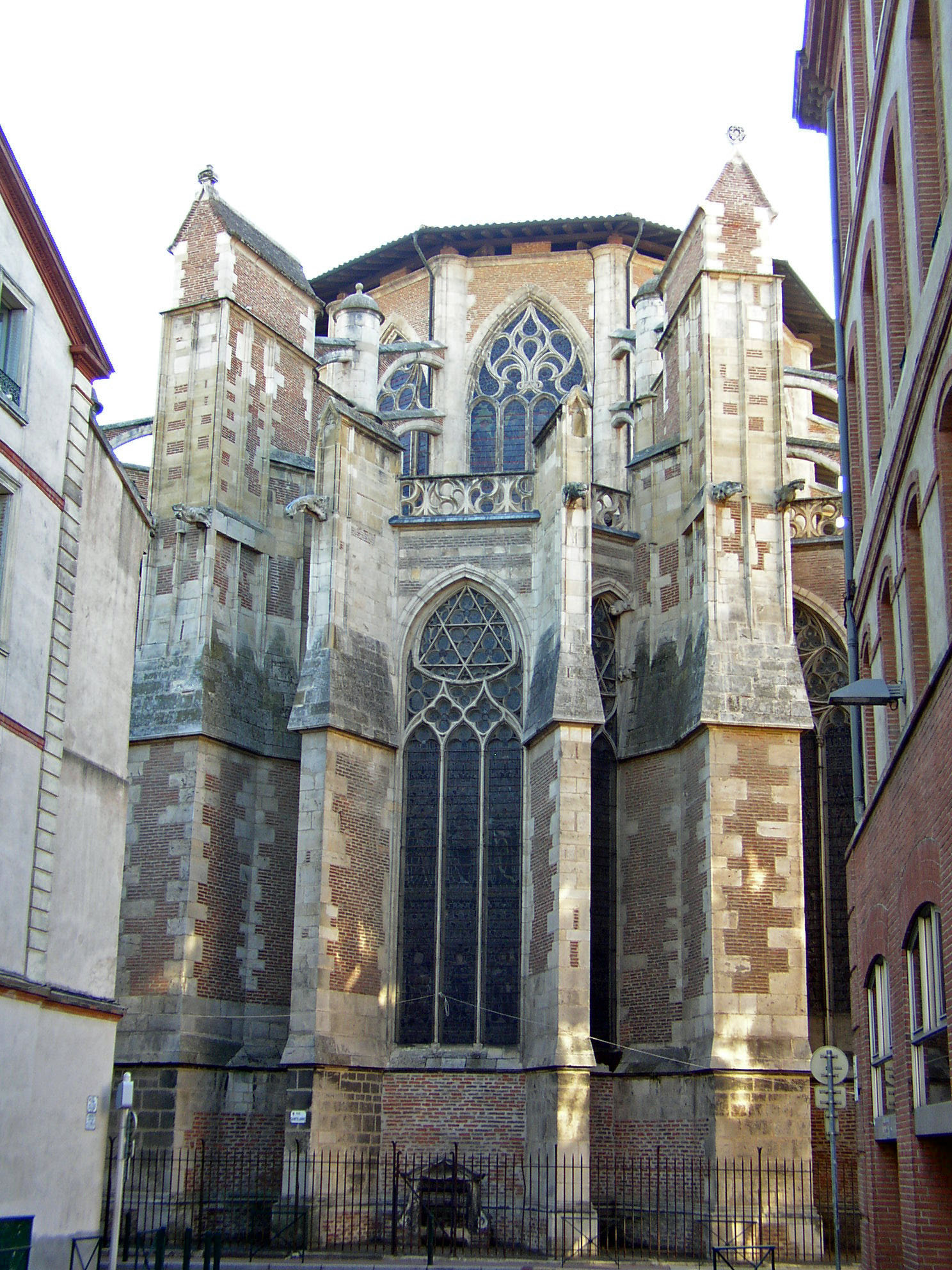
The chevet, or east end, with its massive buttresses

The cathedral is built of brick, like many churches in southern France, due to a lack of suitable stone. The irregular west front exists because the cathedral consists of two incomplete churches of different periods, awkwardly put together. The first, the nave, dating from the early 13th century (1210 to 1220), includes the rose window from 1230 on the west front.

The choir was begun was about 1272, on a new plan and a different axis, was very slow in construction. The new, more ornate northern French Gothic style was introduced to fight Cathar heresy through preaching and more dramatic and inspiring architecture. It also signalled the adherence of Toulouse to France, following the Albigensian Crusade and the extinction of the lineage of the Counts of Toulouse.

The massive brick buttresses against the walls of the choir were built with the expectation that the choir would forty meters high; but due to delays and financial problems, it only reached a height of 28 meters.

The early bell tower, combined with a fortress-like donjon, was built in on the north side of the west front. It was supported by two massive buttresses. It was enlarged in the 16th century by a new tower built against its side, and eventually reached a height 56 meters and a width of five meters.

== Interior ==
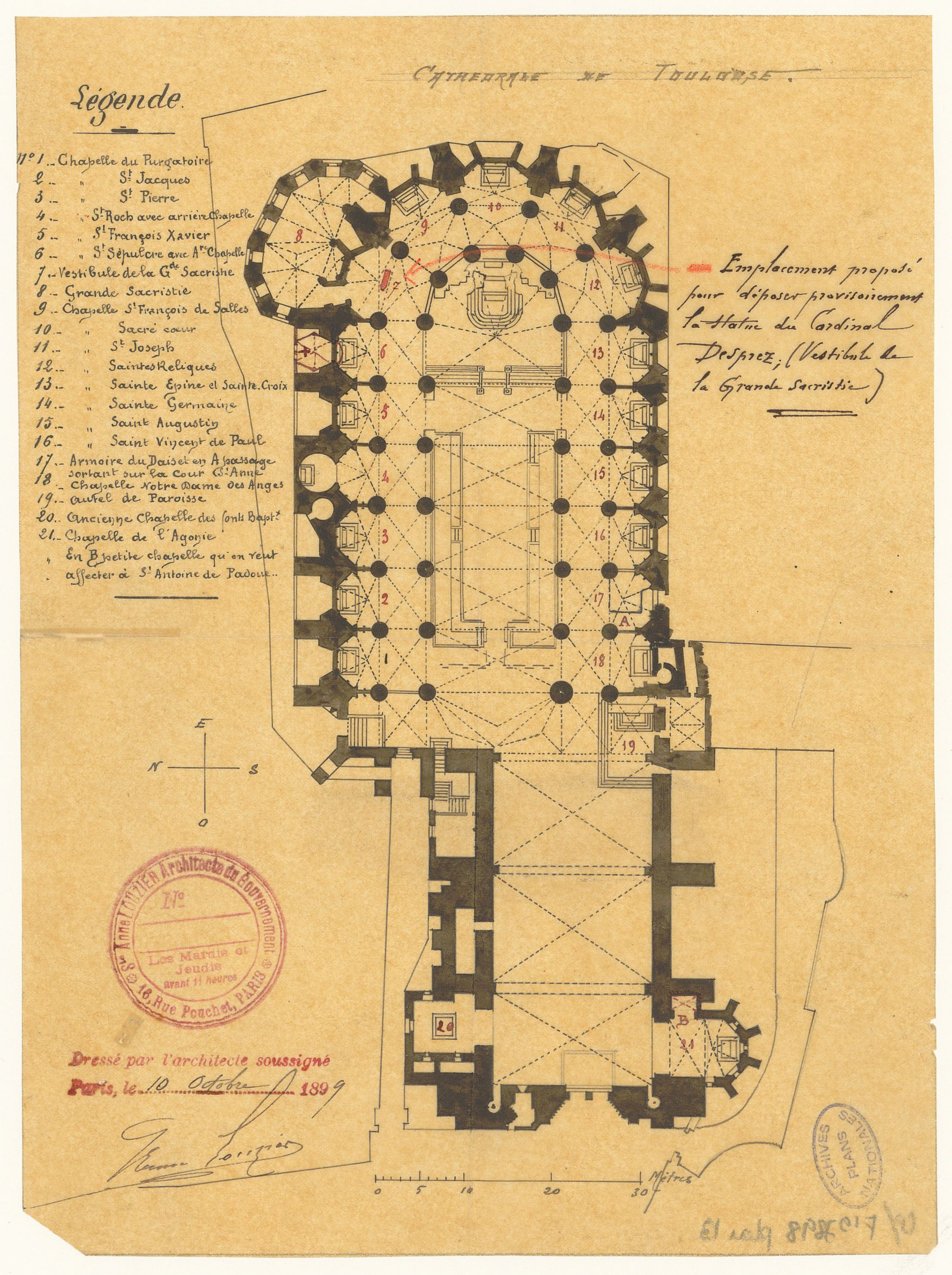
Cathedral plan (1899) (Archives Nationales)

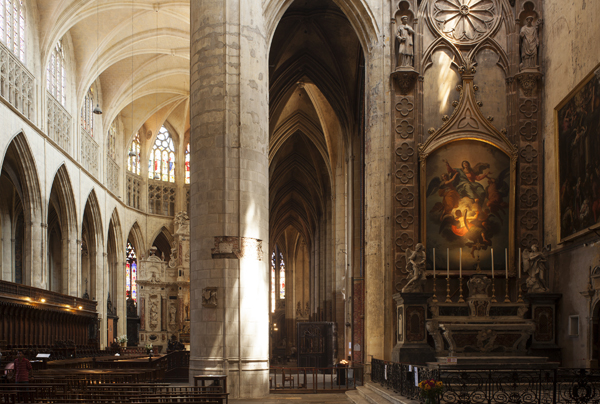
The massive pillar d'Orleans at the awkward meeting point of the nave (right foreground) and choir (left background)

The interior is as disconcerting as the exterior because the two sections are not on the same axis and juxtapose two styles of Gothic architecture. A massive round pillar, built at the beginning of the 16th century in an attempt to begin the transept, now stands incongruously between the two parts, lining up with the center of the nave in the west, and with the south pillars of the choir in the east. Of the 15 chapels, the oldest date from 1279 to 1286, but the majority were completed during the 14th century. Most of the stained glass is 19th-century, but there is glass from almost every century beginning with the end of the 13th in the Saint Vincent de Paul chapel. This is the oldest stained glass in Toulouse.

=== The nave ===
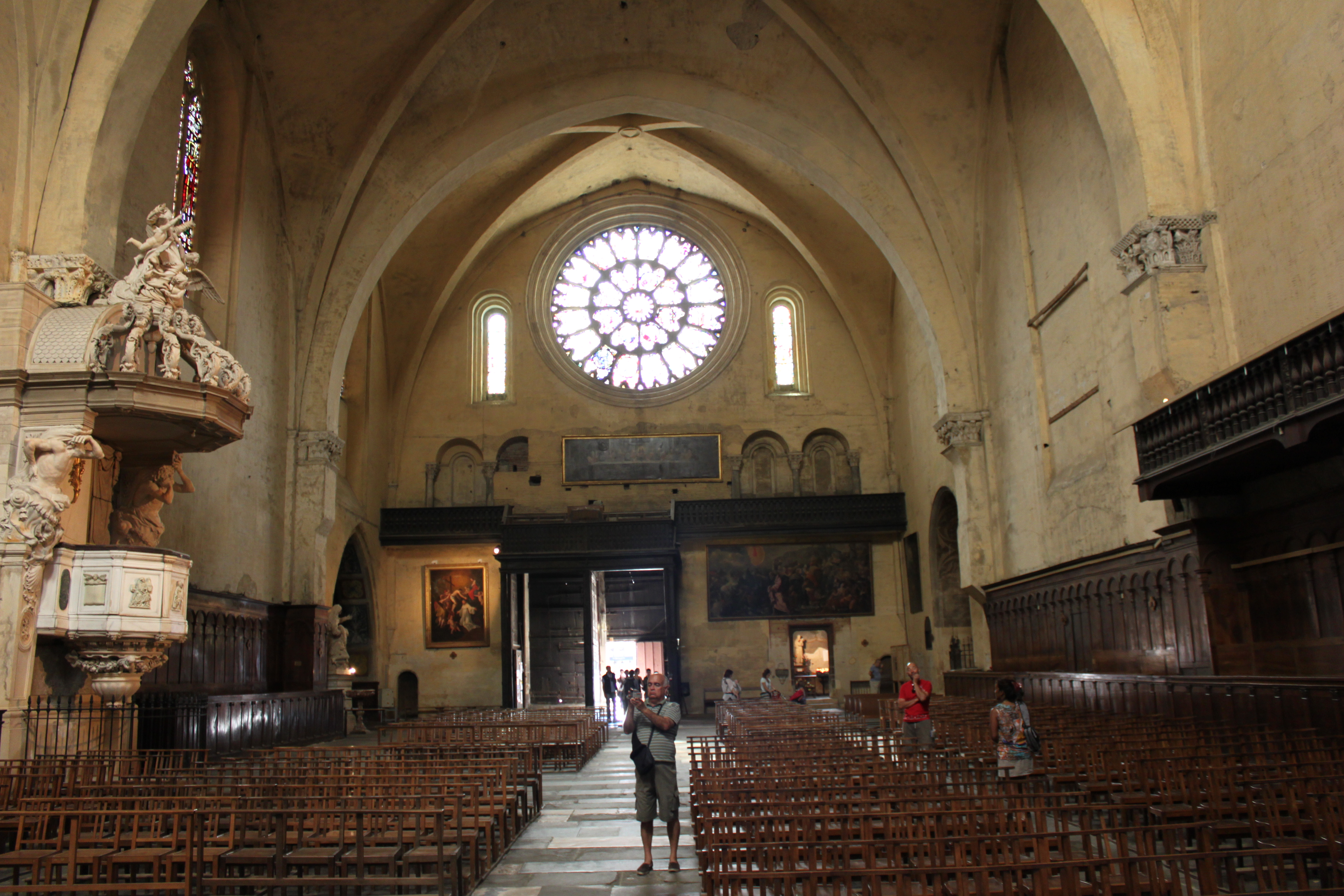
View of the nave looking west, with rose window and pulpit

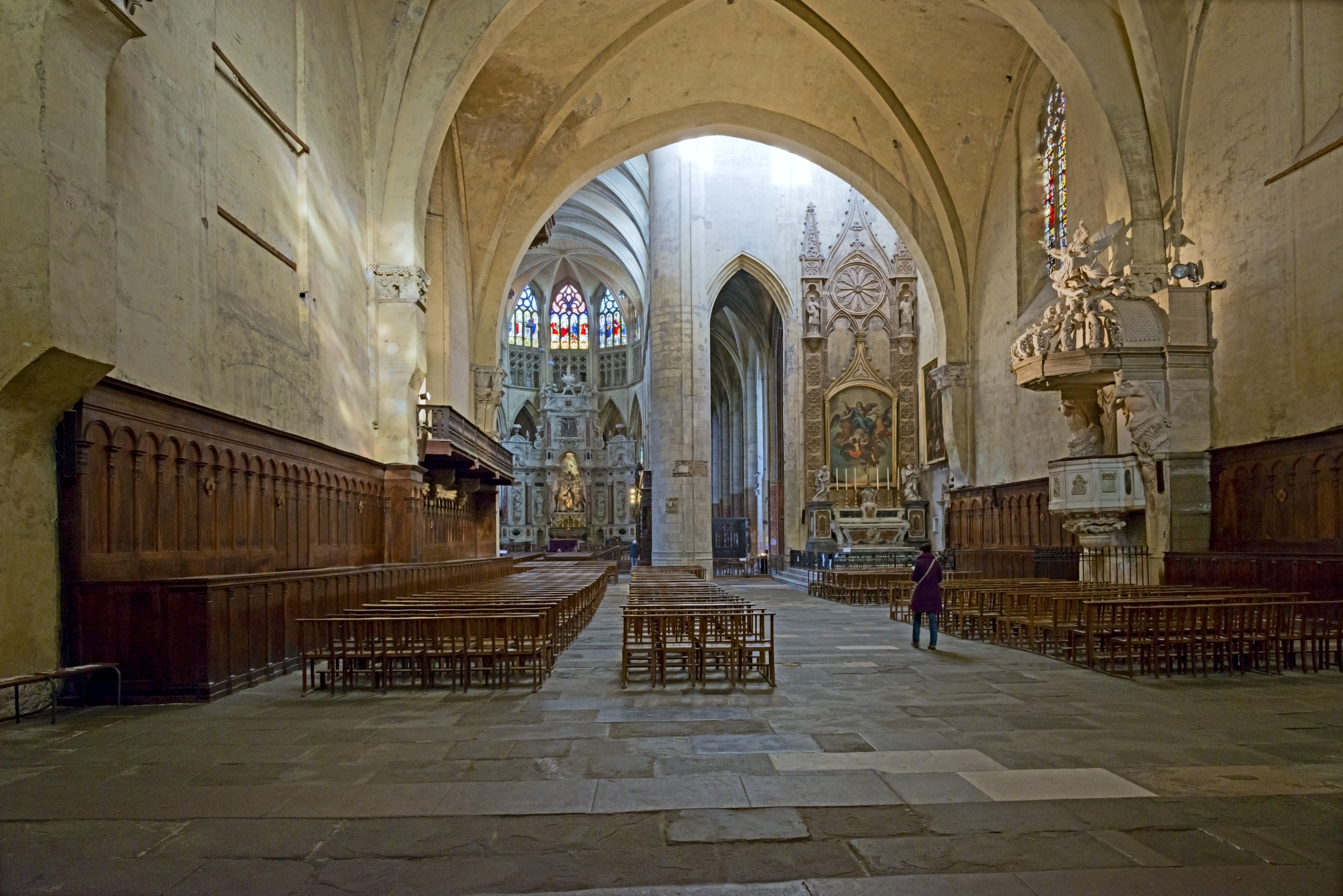
The nave, facing east toward the choir

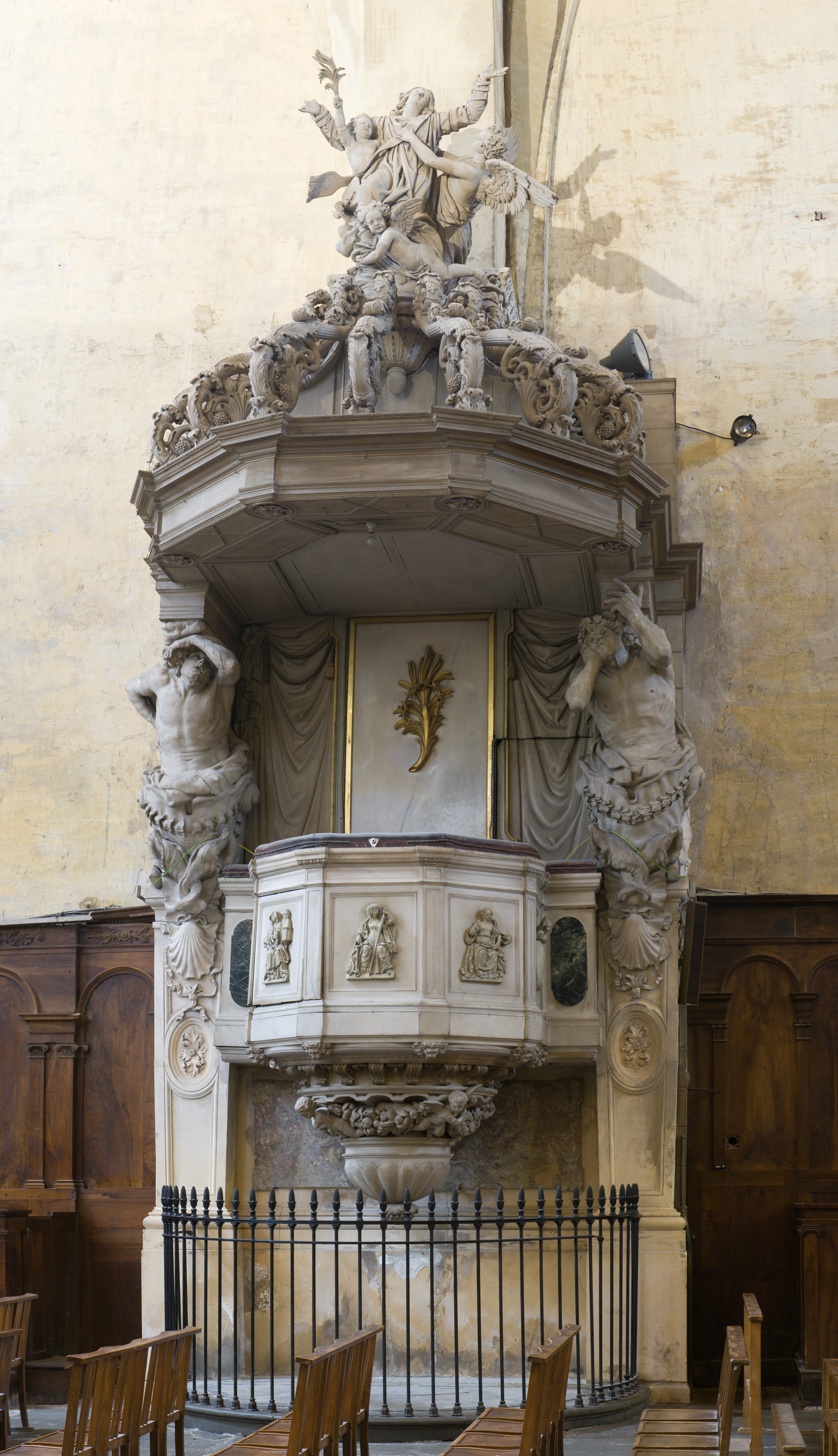
The pulpit in the nave (1842)

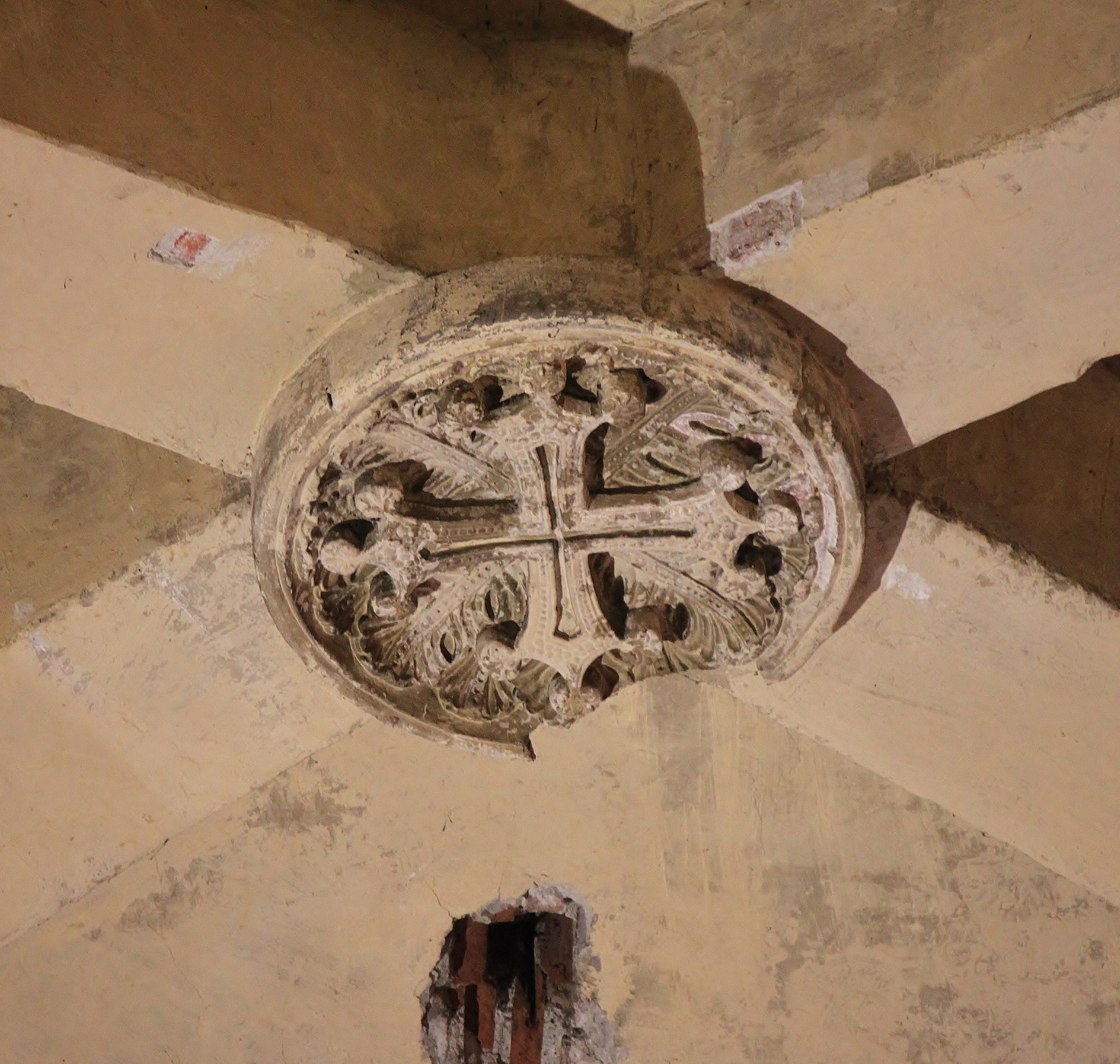
Keystone of a vault in the nave, with the cross emblem of the Counts of Toulouse

The nave is the oldest part of the cathedral. It was originally built in 1078, then rebuilt in southern Gothic style at the beginning of the 13th century. This style was sometimes called "Raymondine" for the Count of Toulouse, Raymond VI. The distinctive characteristics of the southern Gothic were large spaces covered by single vault crossing, and very large buttresses pressed against the walls, rather than flying buttresses. This style, with large spaces and few columns, was designed for preaching to large congregations.

Toulouse Cathedral has an unusual rectangular profile, with the width of each bay (19 meters) almost equalling its height (20 meters). Each traverse is covered by single large rib vault from wall to wall. The ribs of the vaults are supported by columns set into the walls and decorated with carved capitals depicting Biblical scenes. The walls were originally decorated by large frescoes.

=== The choir and chapels ===
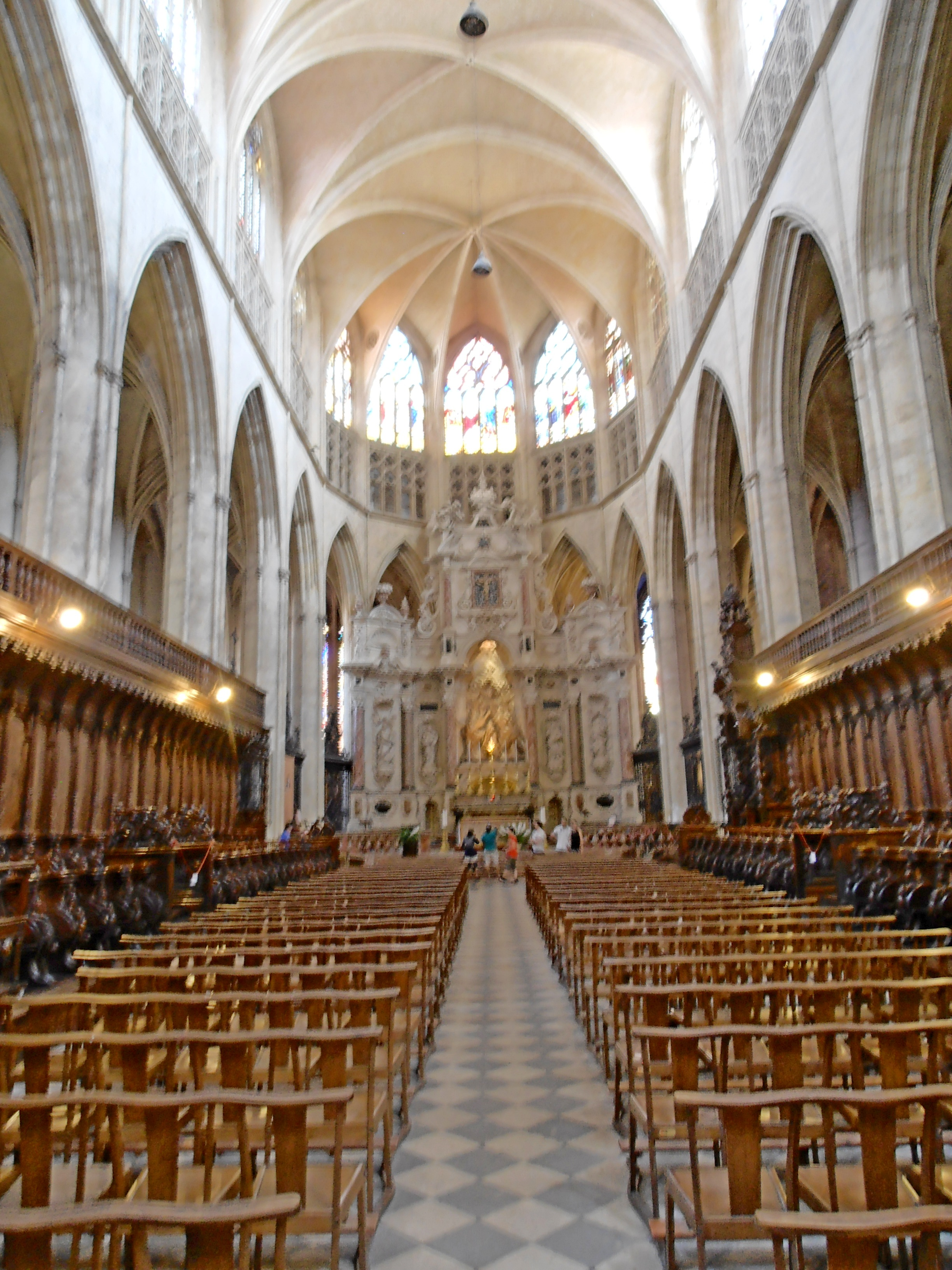
The choir, looking east to the apse

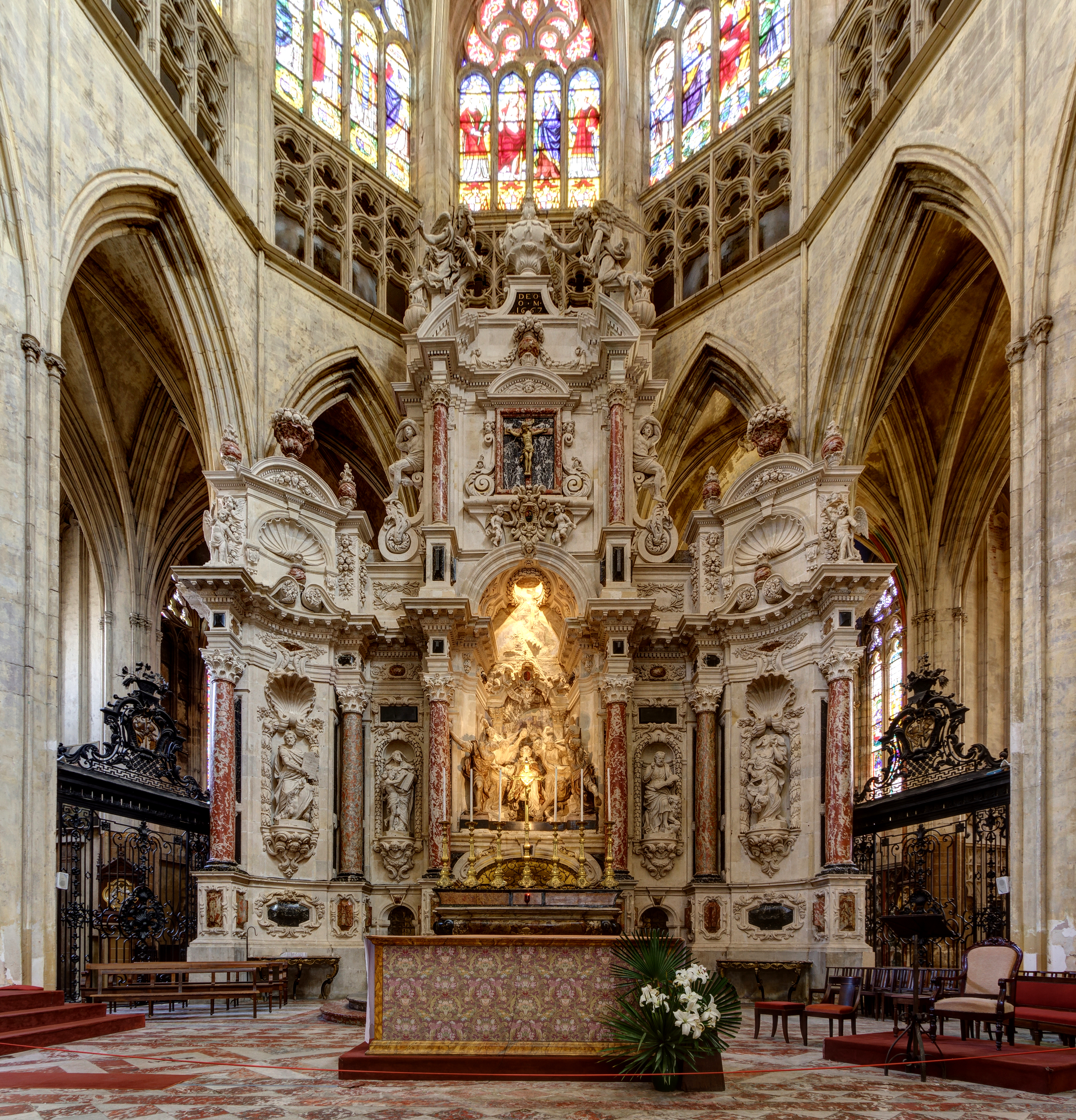
The high altar in the choir, by sculptor Gervais Drouet (1668)

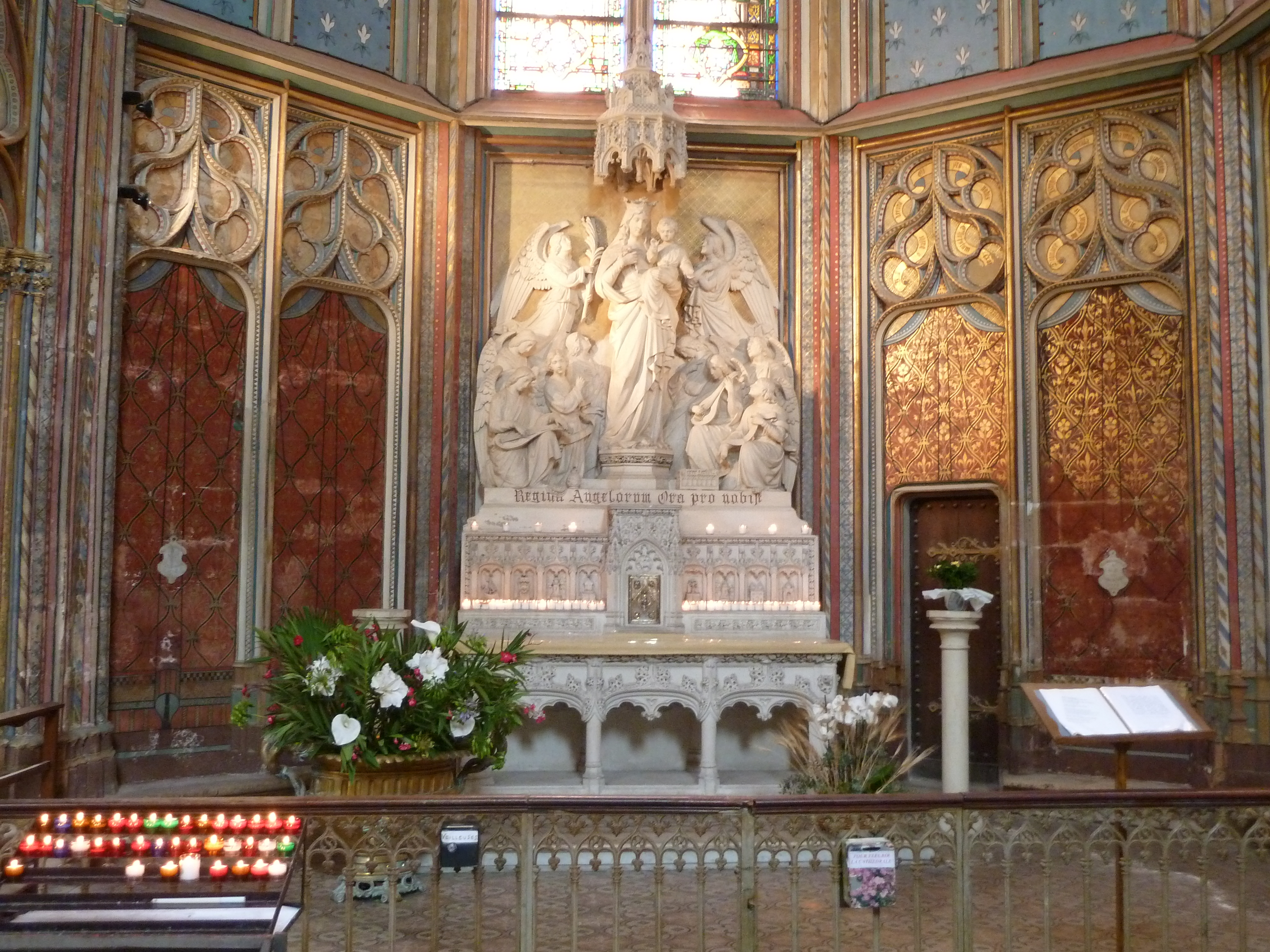
The Chapel of Notre-Dame des Anges

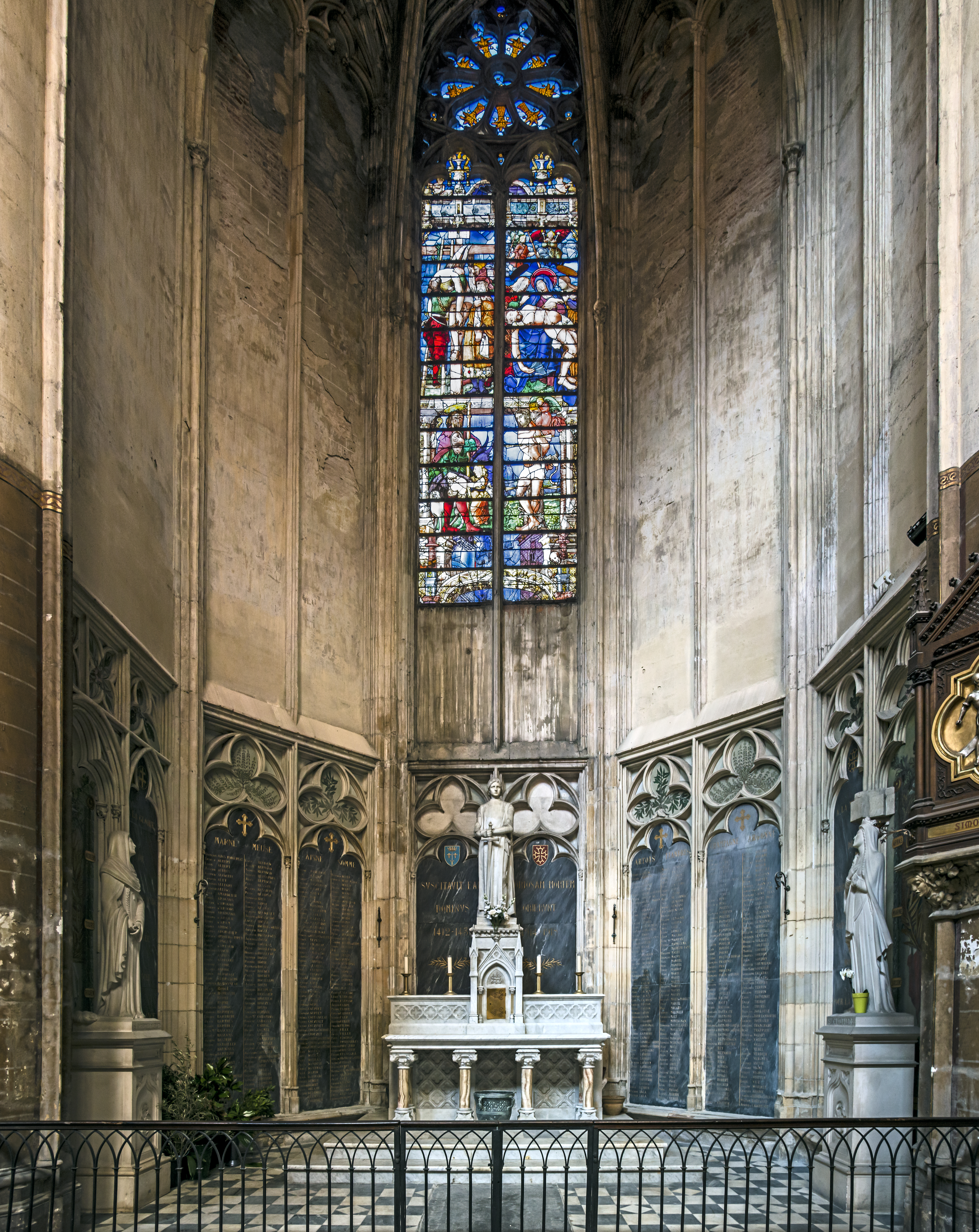
Chapel of Saint Joan of Arc

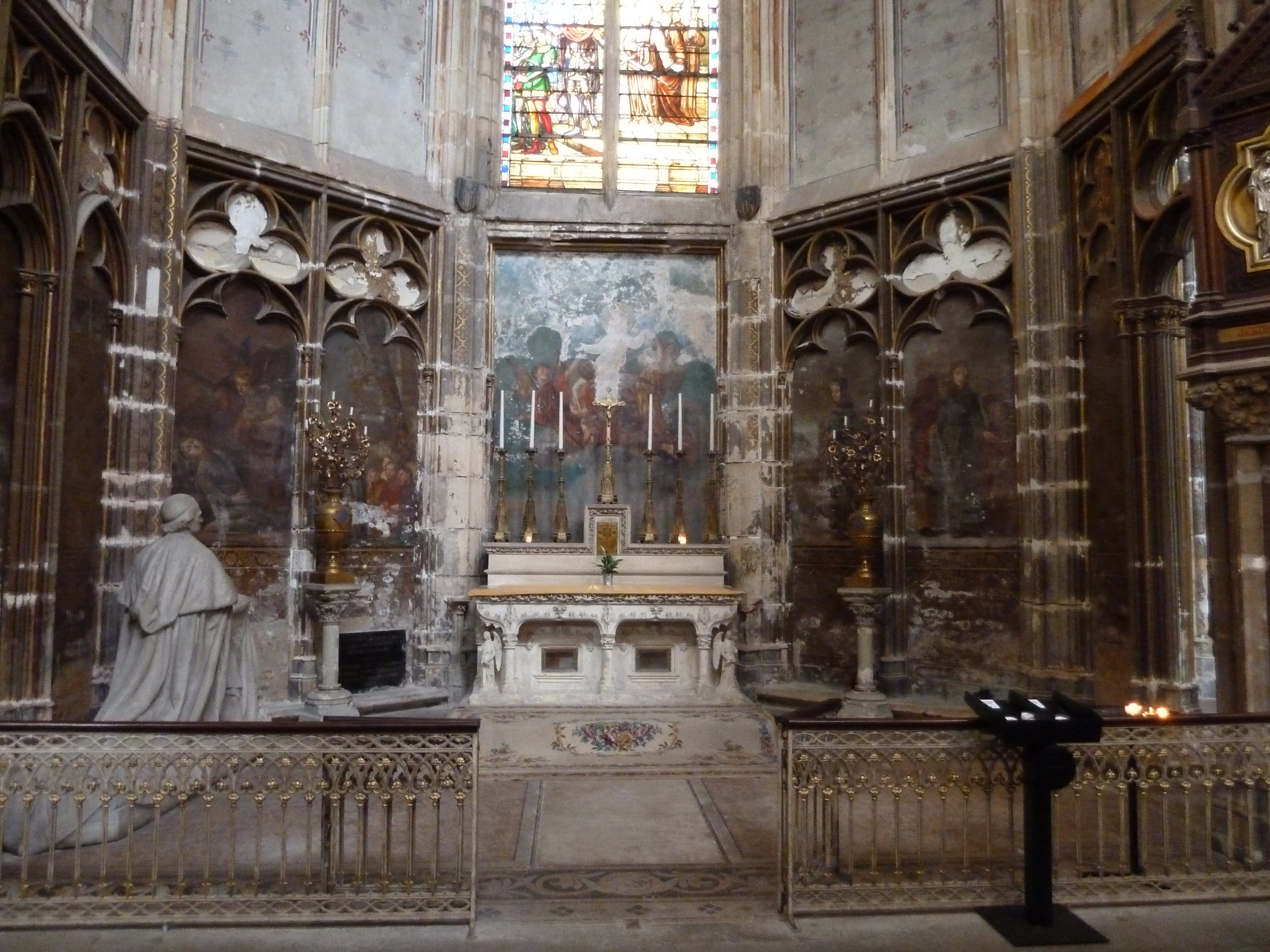
Chapel of Saint Germain

The vast proportions of the five-bay choir, with an ambulatory and radiating chapels, dwarf the older nave. It was begun in 1272 by the Bishop Bertrand de Isle-Jourdan, using a design very different from the smaller nave, and not on the same axis with it. By all appearances, the original intent was to demolish the old nave, and replace it with a new structure aligned with and in a similar style to the choir. However, political turmoil and financial problems intervened. At the end of the 15th century the choir still did not have a roof. Early in the 16th century, the bishop Jean d'Orleans launched a project to lengthen and finish the choir and construct a full transept. To provide support for this new structure he constructed the massive "d'Orléans pillar" between the nave and the choir. In 1609, a fire destroyed the unfinished roof of the choir. In order to rebuild it more quickly, the plans were revised, and the vaulted ceiling of the choir was given a height of only 27 meters, far lower than the original design. To compensate for the more modest architecture, the choir was given an extremely imposing main altar, designed between 1667 and 1670 by the architect Pierre Mercier and the sculptor Gervais Drouet. It was completed in 1668, and depicts the stoning of Saint Stephen.

Fifteen small chapels were built around the choir, placed between buttresses. They were all decorated with paintings and sculpture illustrating the events of the patron saints.

== Art and decoration ==
=== Stained glass ===
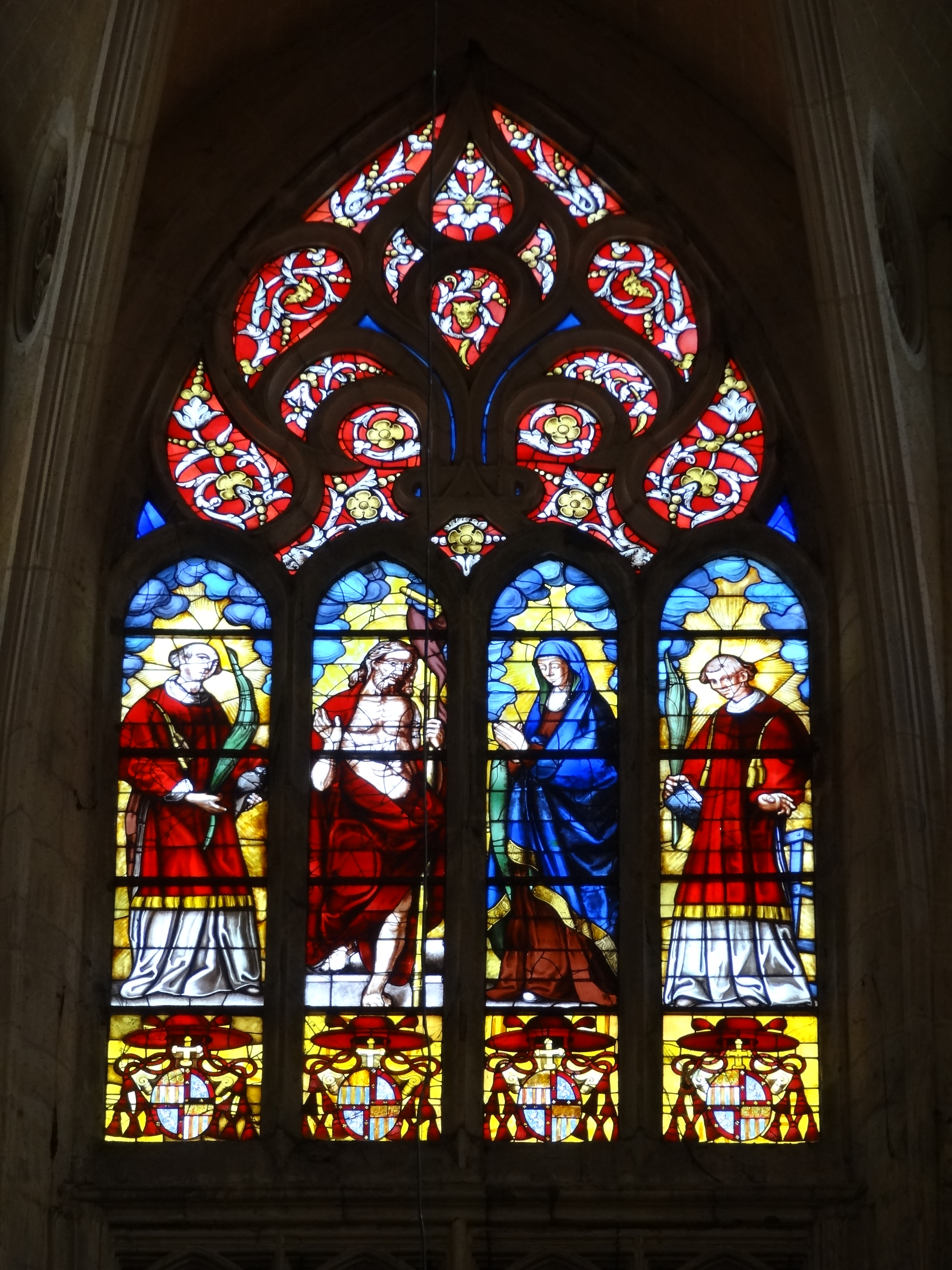
Flamboyant stained glass

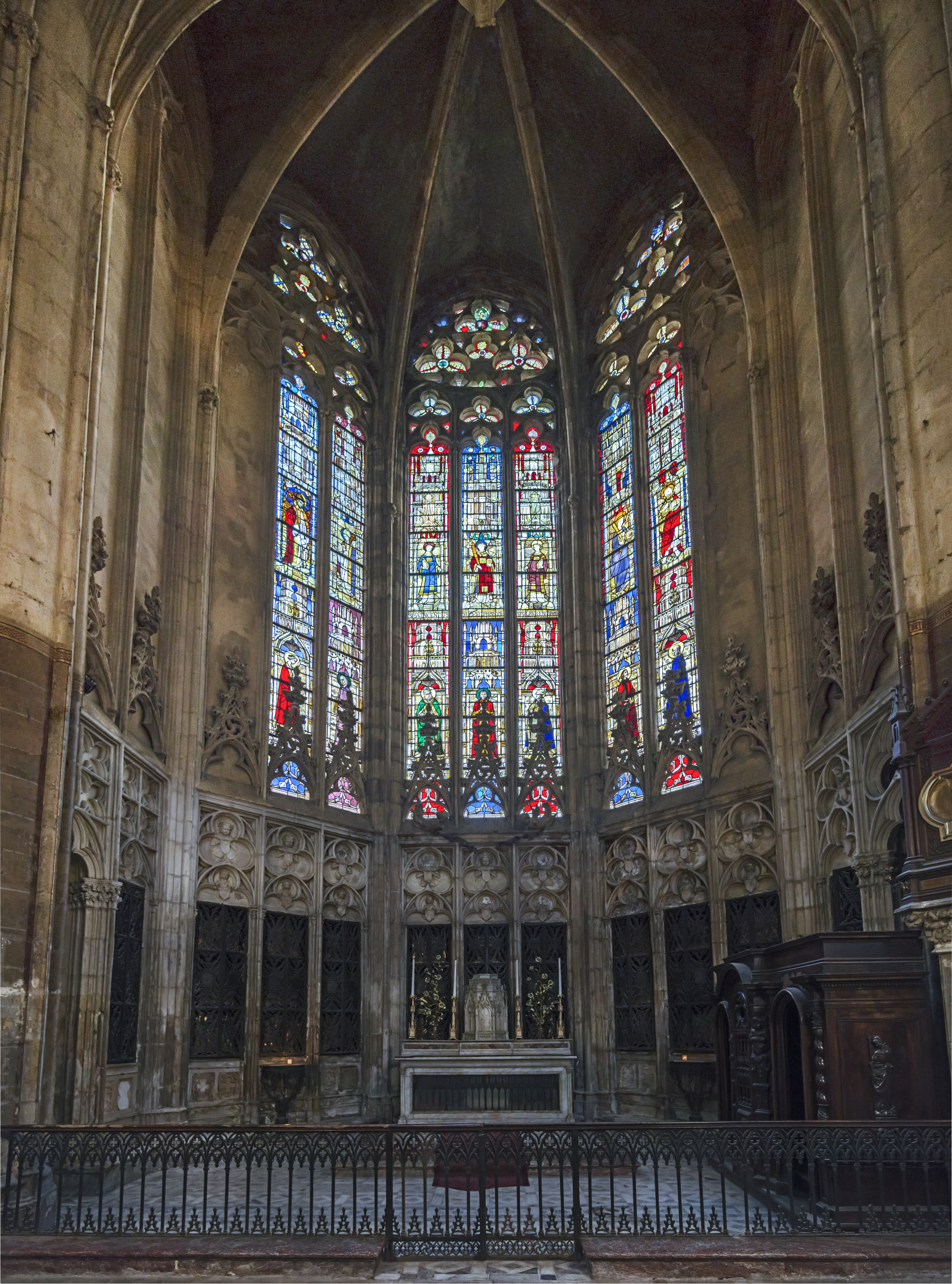
Windows in the Chapel of Relics

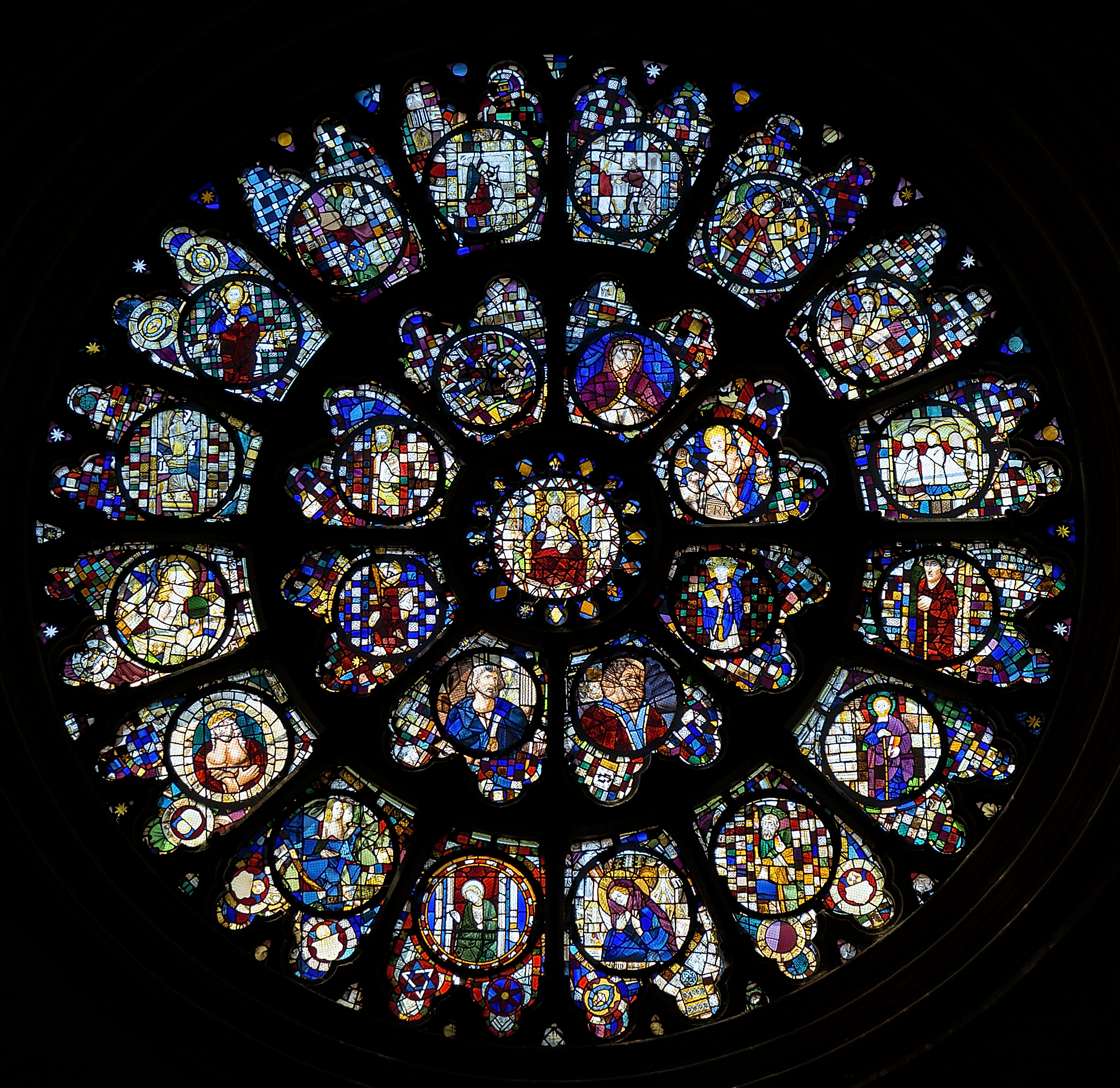
Rose window of the west front (1230, with later restorations)

The stained glass windows were frequently damaged and replaced over the centuries. Many were broken during the French Revolution. others during a hurricane in 1808, and others by the explosion of a gunpowder magazine located on the south side of the choir in 1816. Some parts were sold. The glass was widely scattered. One section of the royal window in a chapel was purchased by the American newspaper publisher and art collector William Randolph Hearst, and is now in Forest Lawn Memorial Park, a cemetery. in Glendale, California. Another is in a private collection in British Columbia.

Most of the stained glass windows in the church today date to the 19th century and 20th century. Many of these windows were assembled with a combination of early glass from destroyed windows combined with new glass. The stained glass windows in the nave were put into place in the 1950s. The oldest portions of stained glass, pieces from the 14th to 16th centuries surrounded by more modern glass, are found in the chapels that encircle the choir.

The rose window on the west front, originally installed in 1230, was modelled after that of Notre-Dame de Paris. It was restored in the 19th century.

=== Choir stalls ===
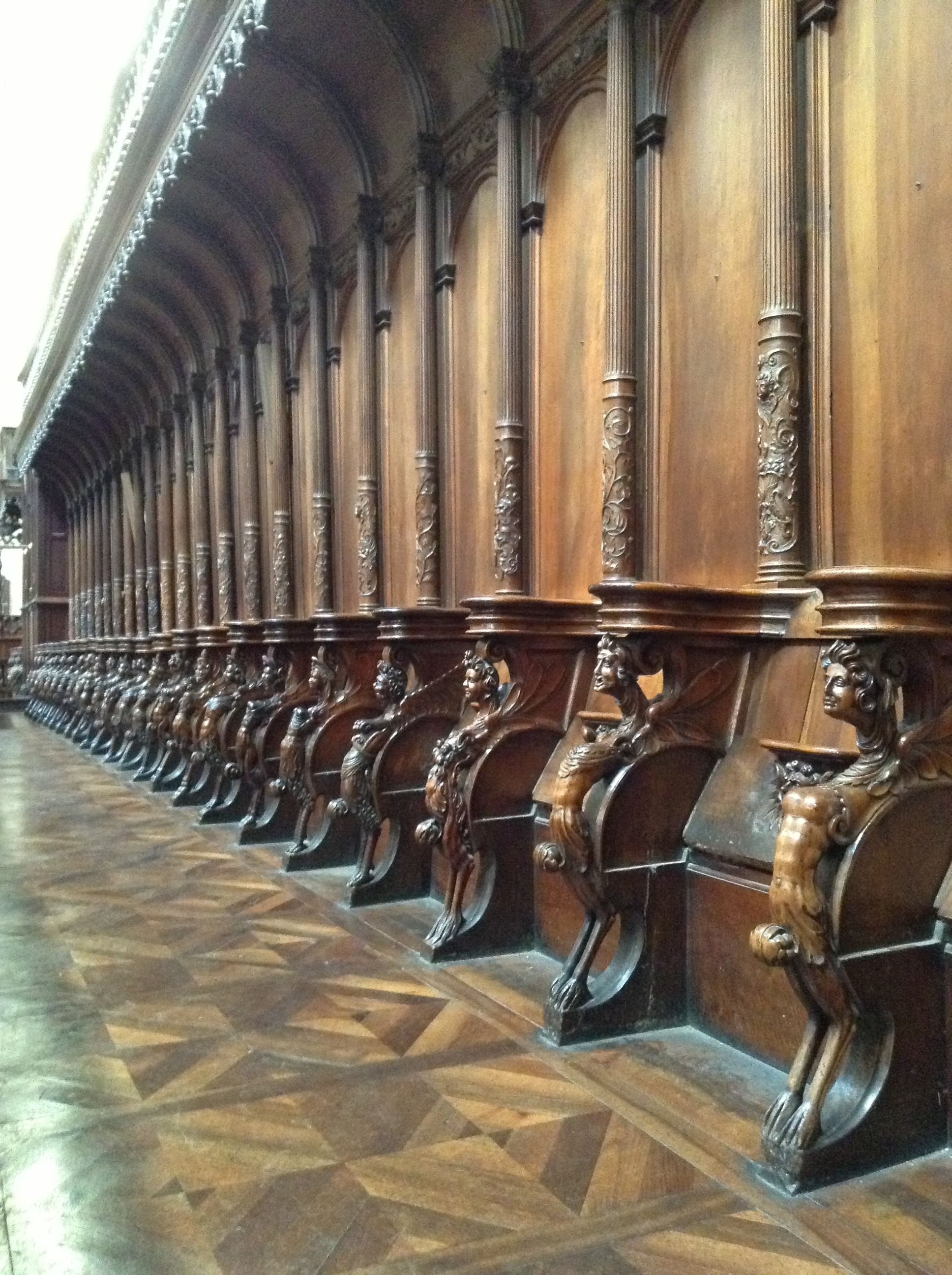
Choir stalls (1610–1613)

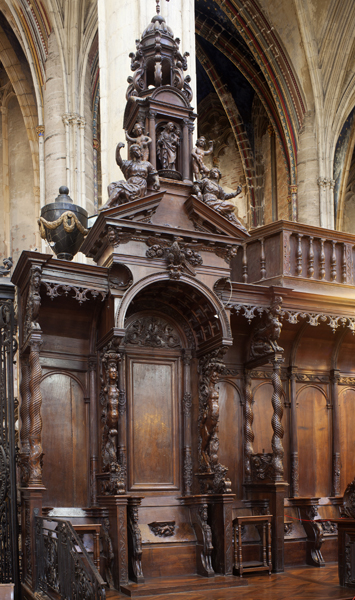
The stall of the bishop

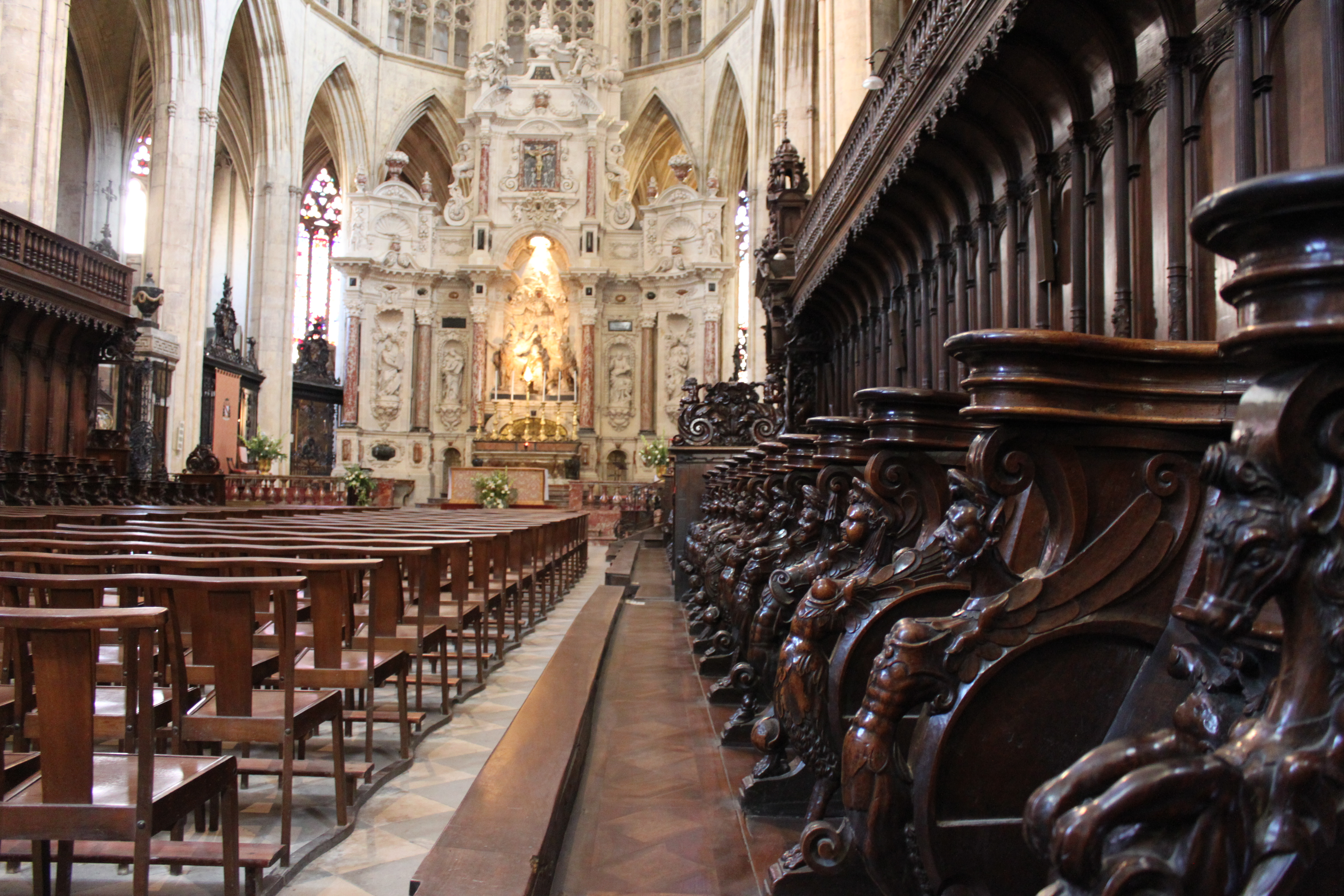
The choir stalls

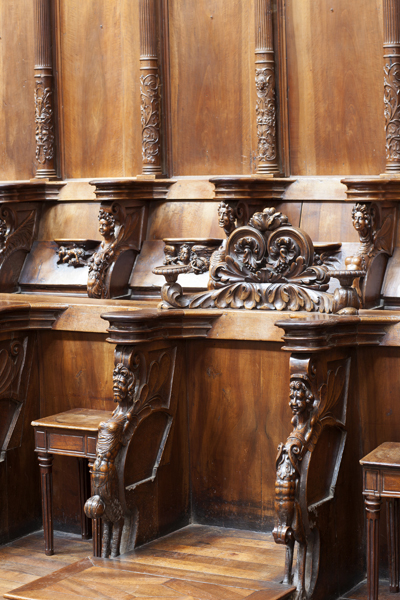
Detail of the choir stalls

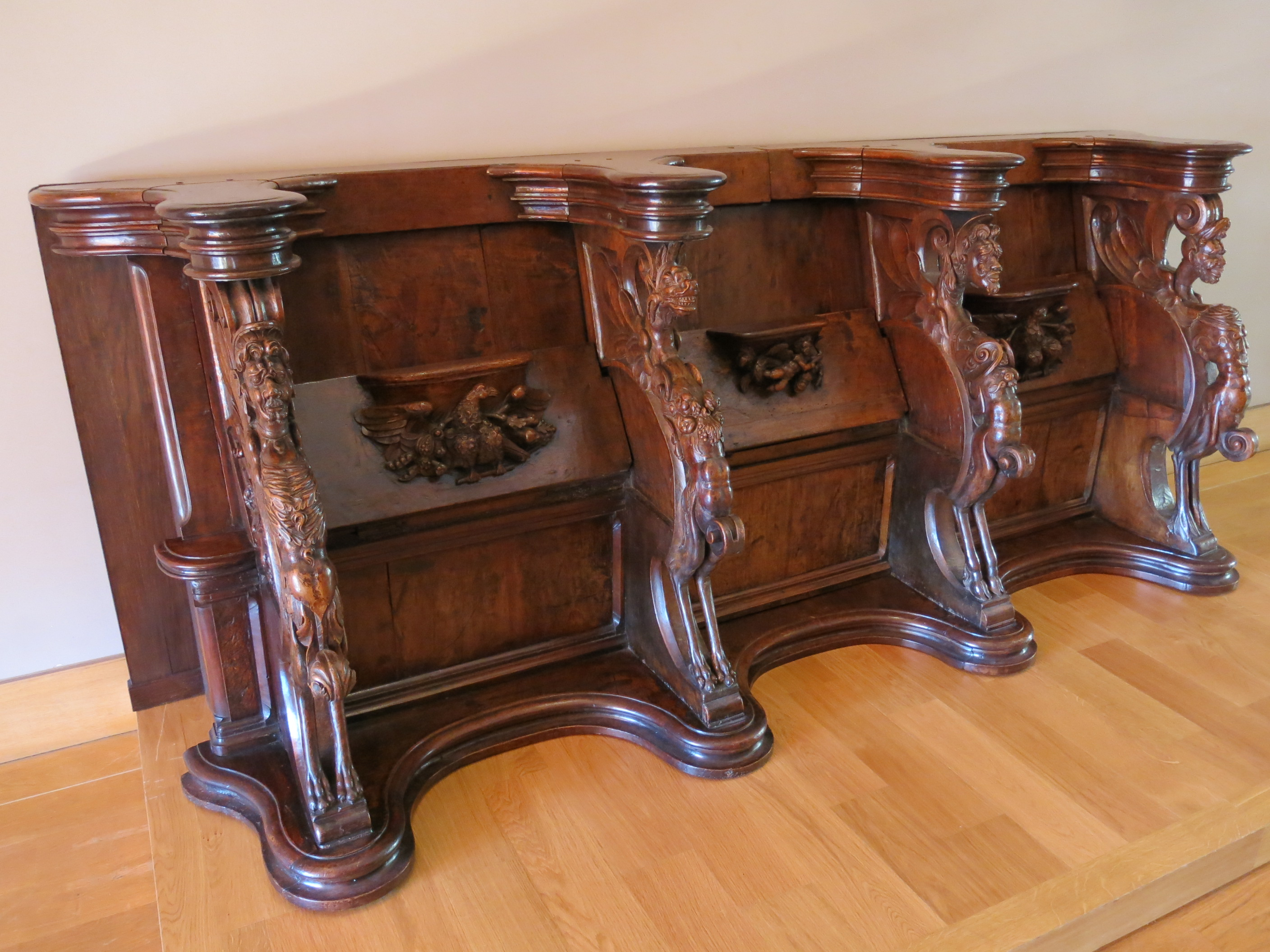
Stalls now in the Louvre museum

The choir stalls are one of the most celebrated decorative features of the cathedral. They are the banks of wooden seats where the clergy were seated during services, and featured decorative elements which provided support when they were required to stand for very long periods of time. There are one hundred fourteen stalls, in the style of the period of Louis XIII, made between 1610 and 1613, placed on both sides of the choir. The most ornate is a triple seat for the provost and the president of Parliament, placed on either side of the seat of the bishop. The stalls are made of finely carved walnut and oak, and topped by a carved sculpture of the Virgin Mary. Their decoration also includes pagan and mythological subjects. They were carved in walnut by Pierre Monge of Narbonne. Some of the stalls are now on display in museums, including the Louvre in Paris. The interesting choir stalls whose decoration includes pagan and mythological subjects were carved in walnut. The walnut case of the organ was carved at the same time, rising some 17 meters above the floor. Restored in 1868 by Cavaillé-Coll and in 1976, the organ is often used for concerts.

=== Tapestries and paintings ===
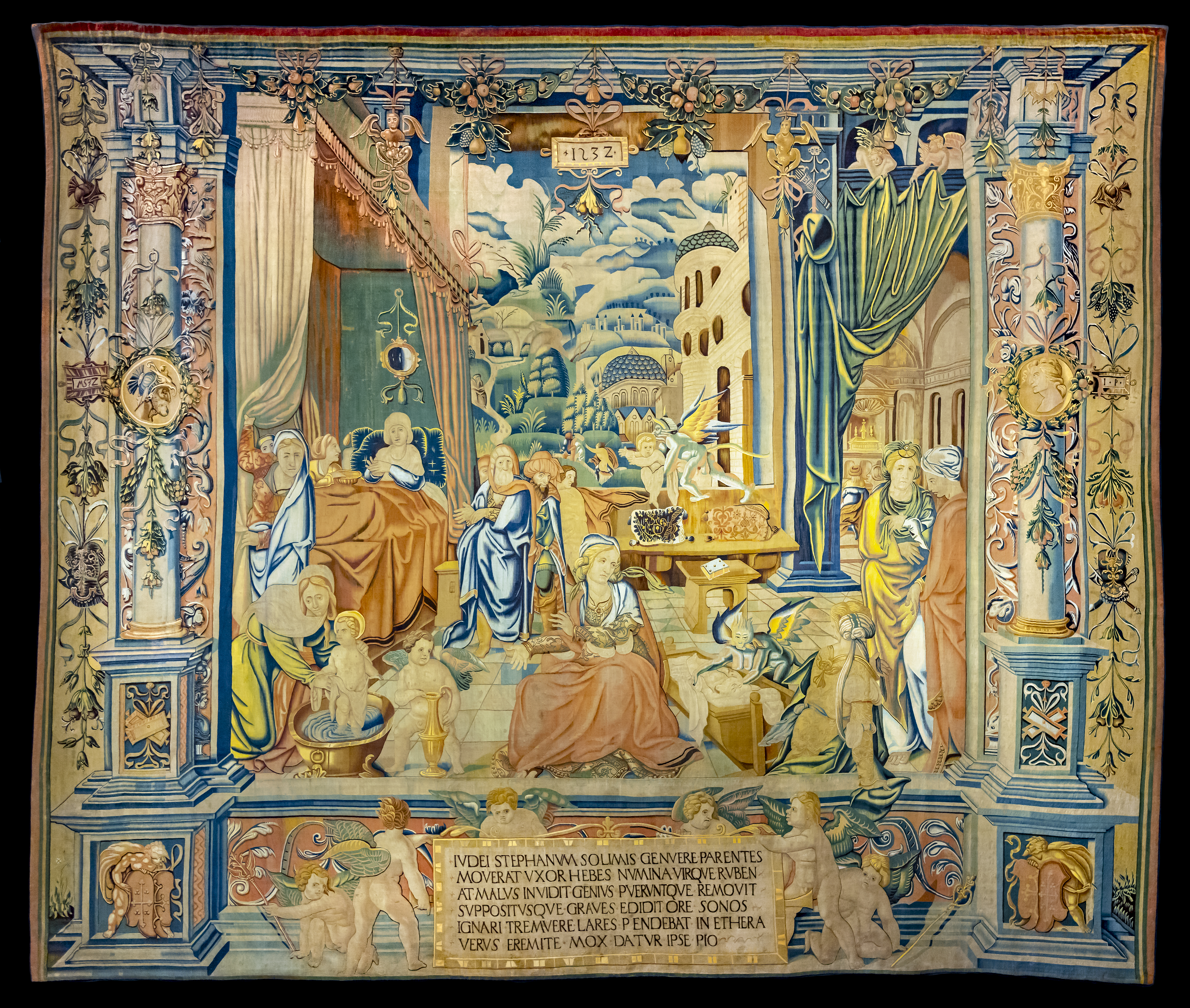
The birth of Saint Stephen, by Jean Pechault (1532)

The cathedral displays four large tapestries depicting events in the life of its patron saint, Saint Stephen. They represent his birth, two scenes of baptism, and his martyrdom by stoning. They were made between 1532 and 1534 by Jean Pechaud, using designs by Charles and Comes Pinfault. An additional tapestry was woven in between 1608 and 1661 by Jean Dumazet. They were originally made to cover the walls over the choir stalls. They are now classified as objects of historical importance by the Ministry of Culture.

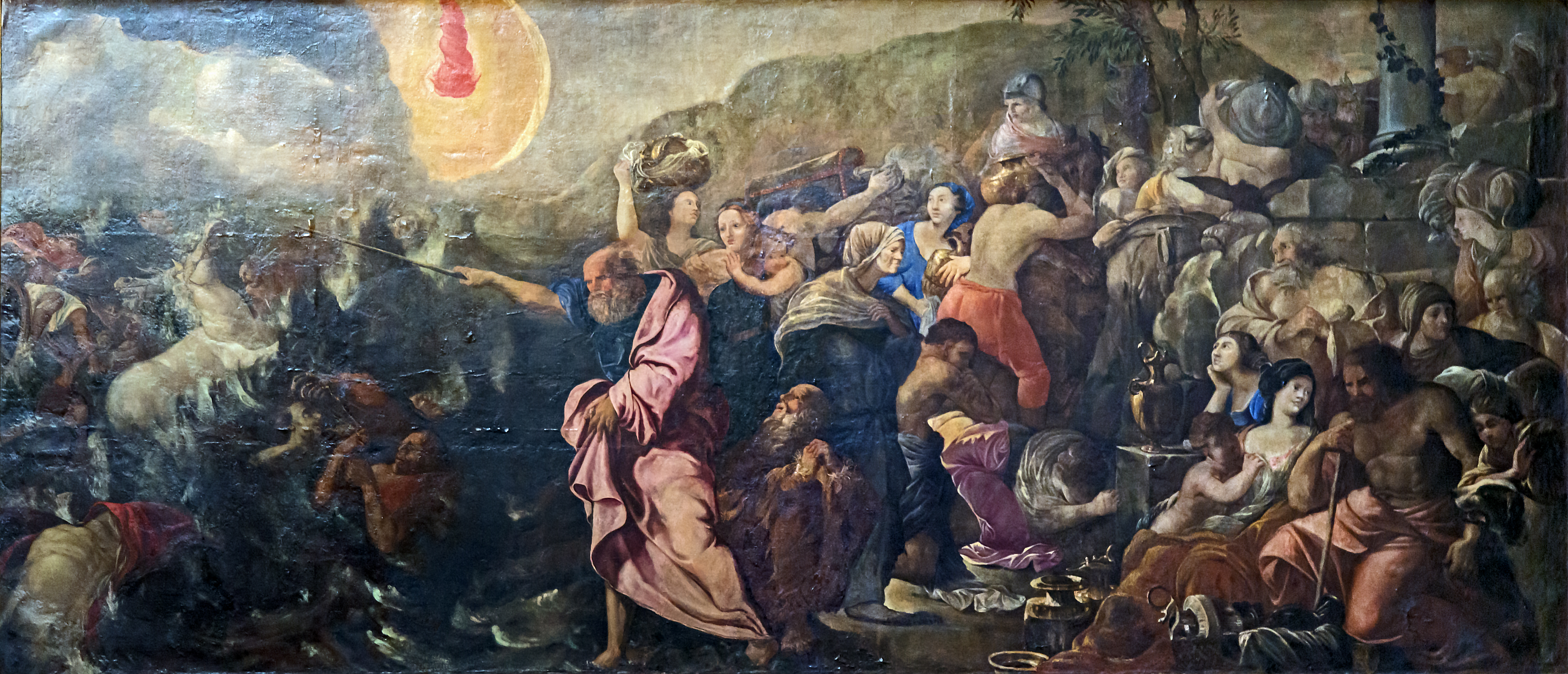
"Moses and the Passage of the Red Sea", inside wall of the west front, in nave (17th century)

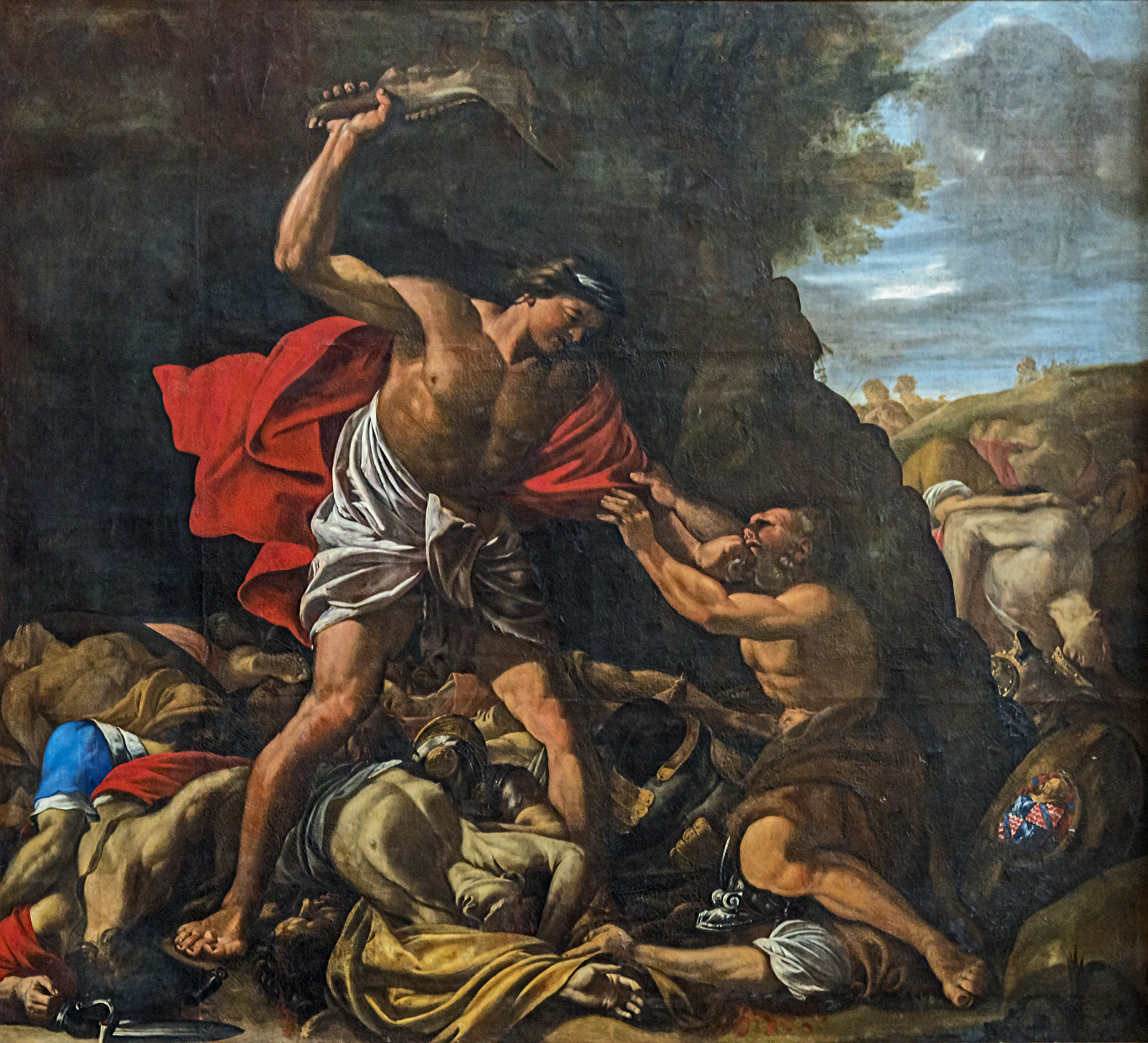
Samon slaying the Philistines, by Hilaire Pader, left part of transept (17th century)

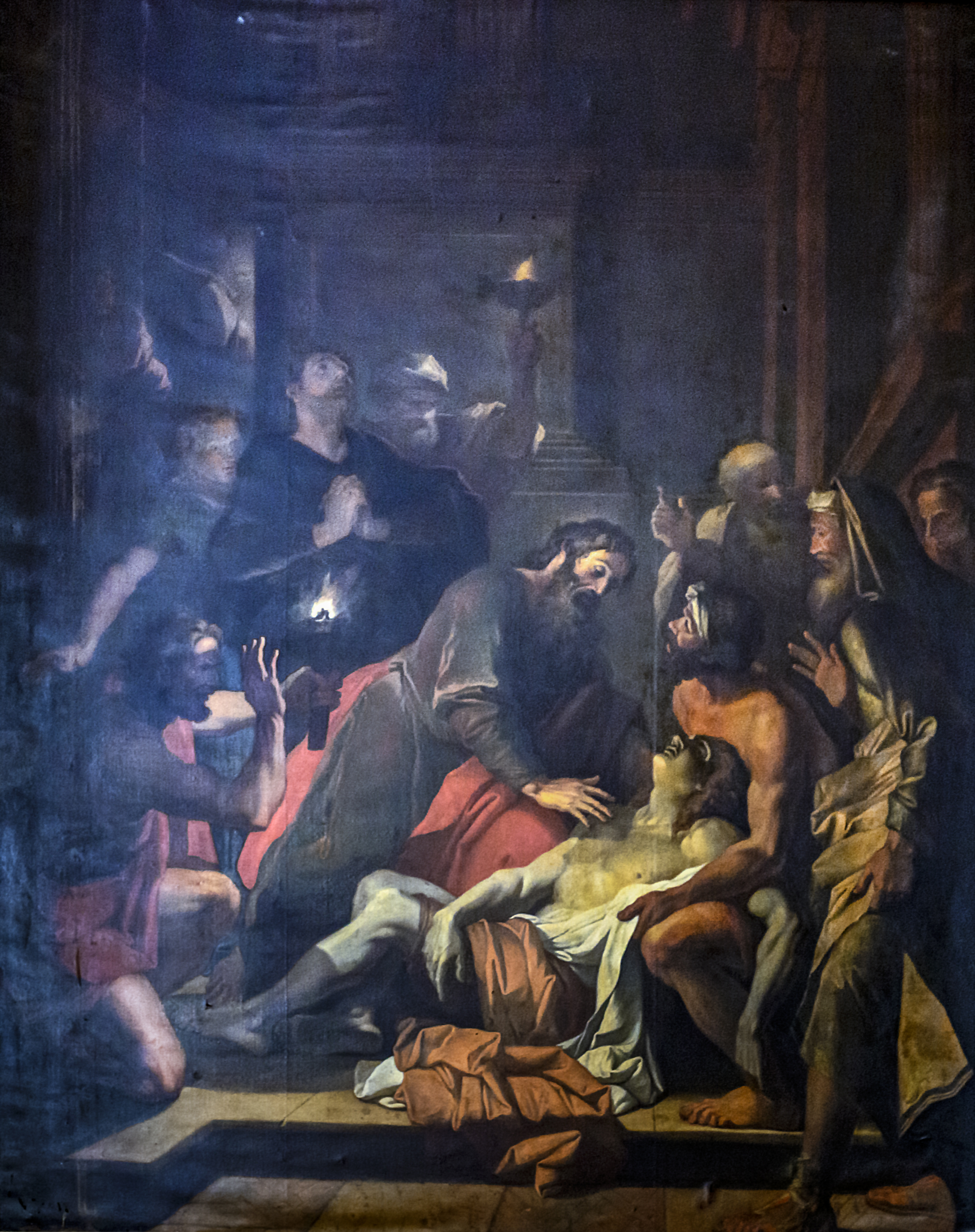
Saint Paul bringing Eutyque back to life, by Jacques François Courtin (17th century)

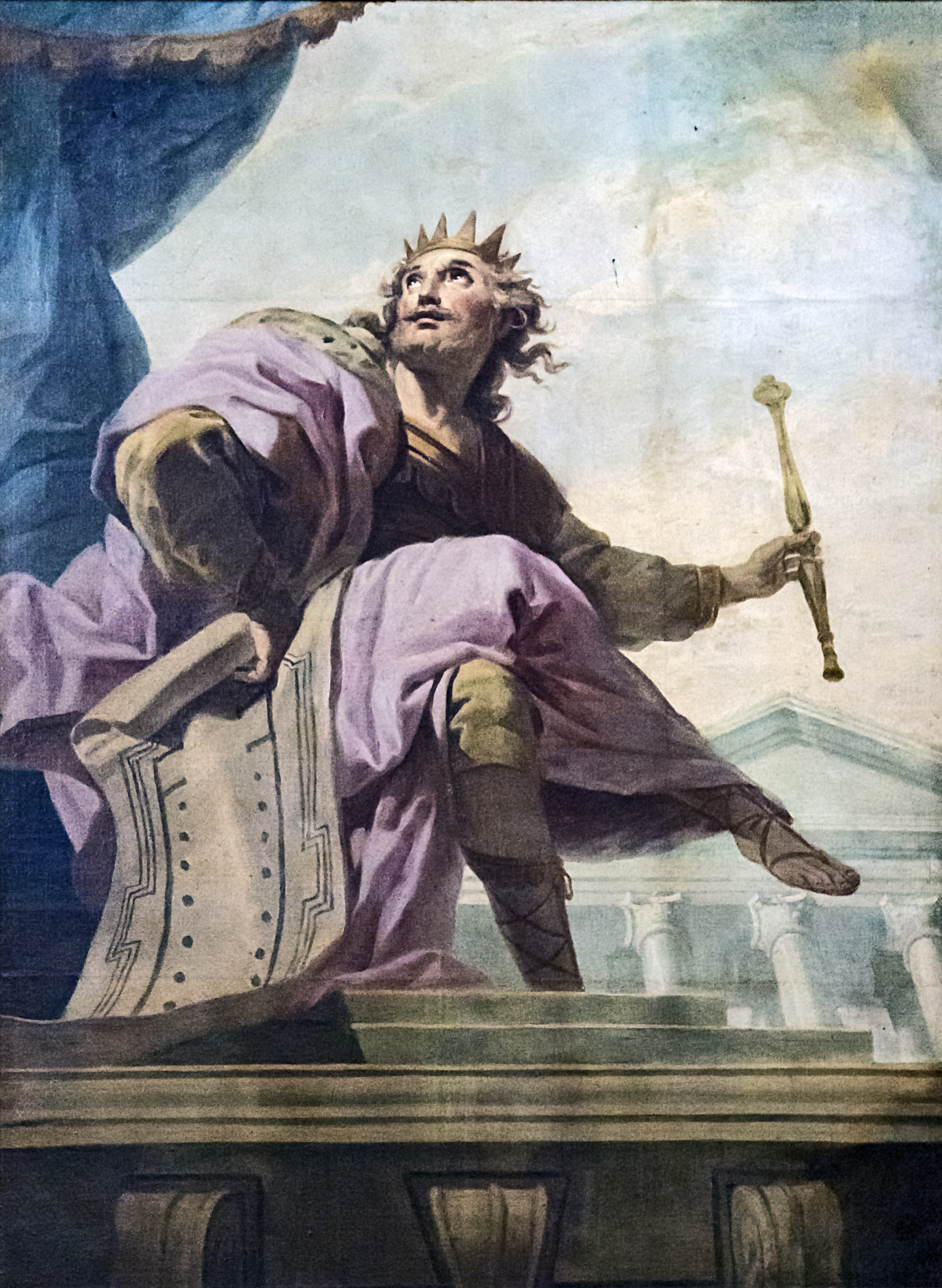
Solomon holding the plans of Jerusalem, by Jean-Baptiste Despax (18th century)

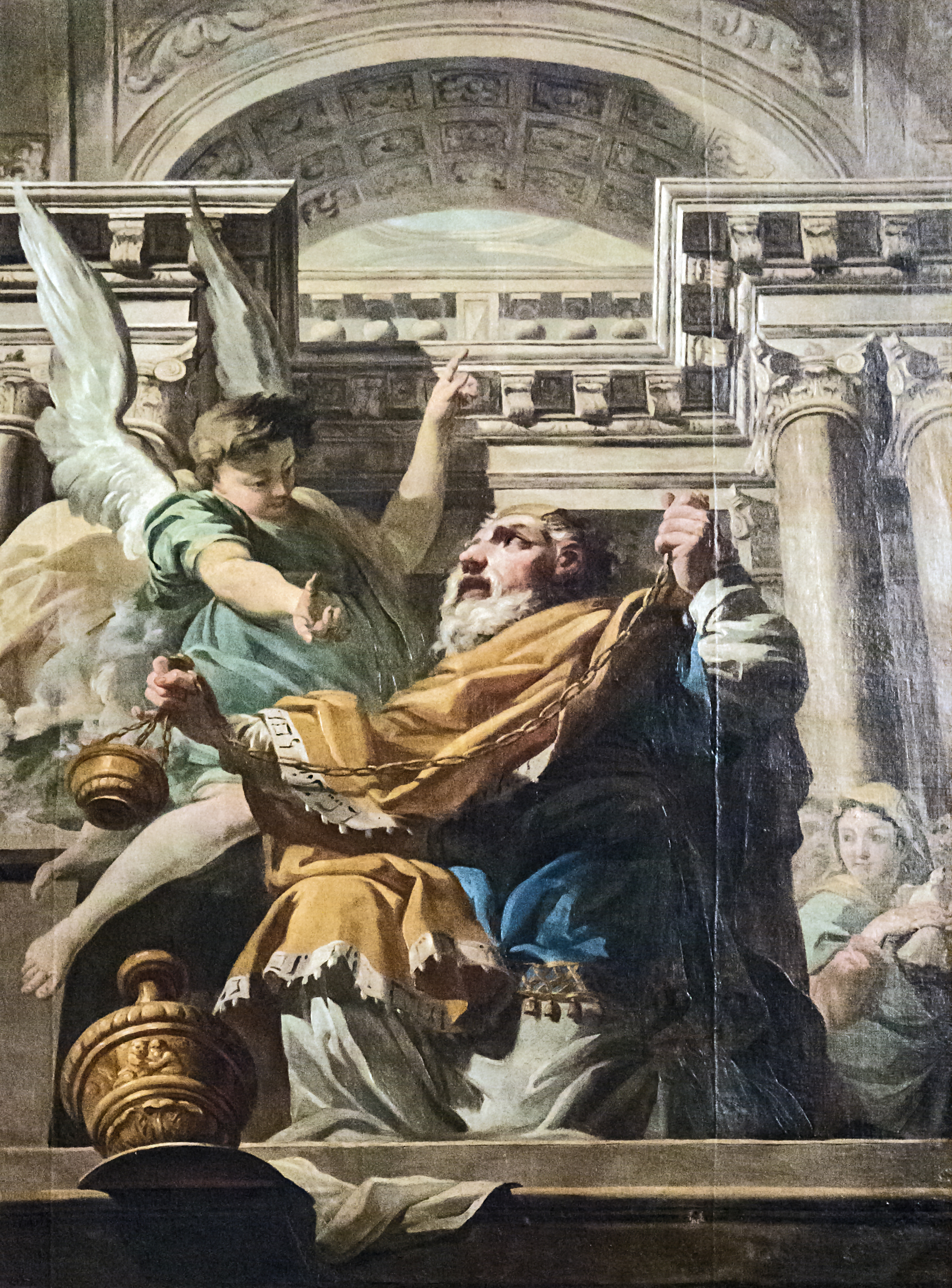
Zachary visited by an angel, by Jean-Baptiste Despax

The cathedral has a large collection of paintings illustrating biblical themes, located in the chapels around the choir and in the nave. Most were painted in the 17th century, in the Baroque style, crowded with figures in movement. Several of the paintings are the work of Hilaire Pader (1607–1677), a prominent Toulouse painter, poet and translator. Another notable artist with work in the cathedral is Jacques François Courtin (1707–1752), a popular Paris genre painter, whose work is also found in the cathedral of Notre-Dame de Paris.

Several works of the 18th-century Toulouse painter Jean-Baptiste Despax (1710–1773), including "Solomon holding the plans of Jerusalem", are also found in the cathedral.

== The choir retable ==
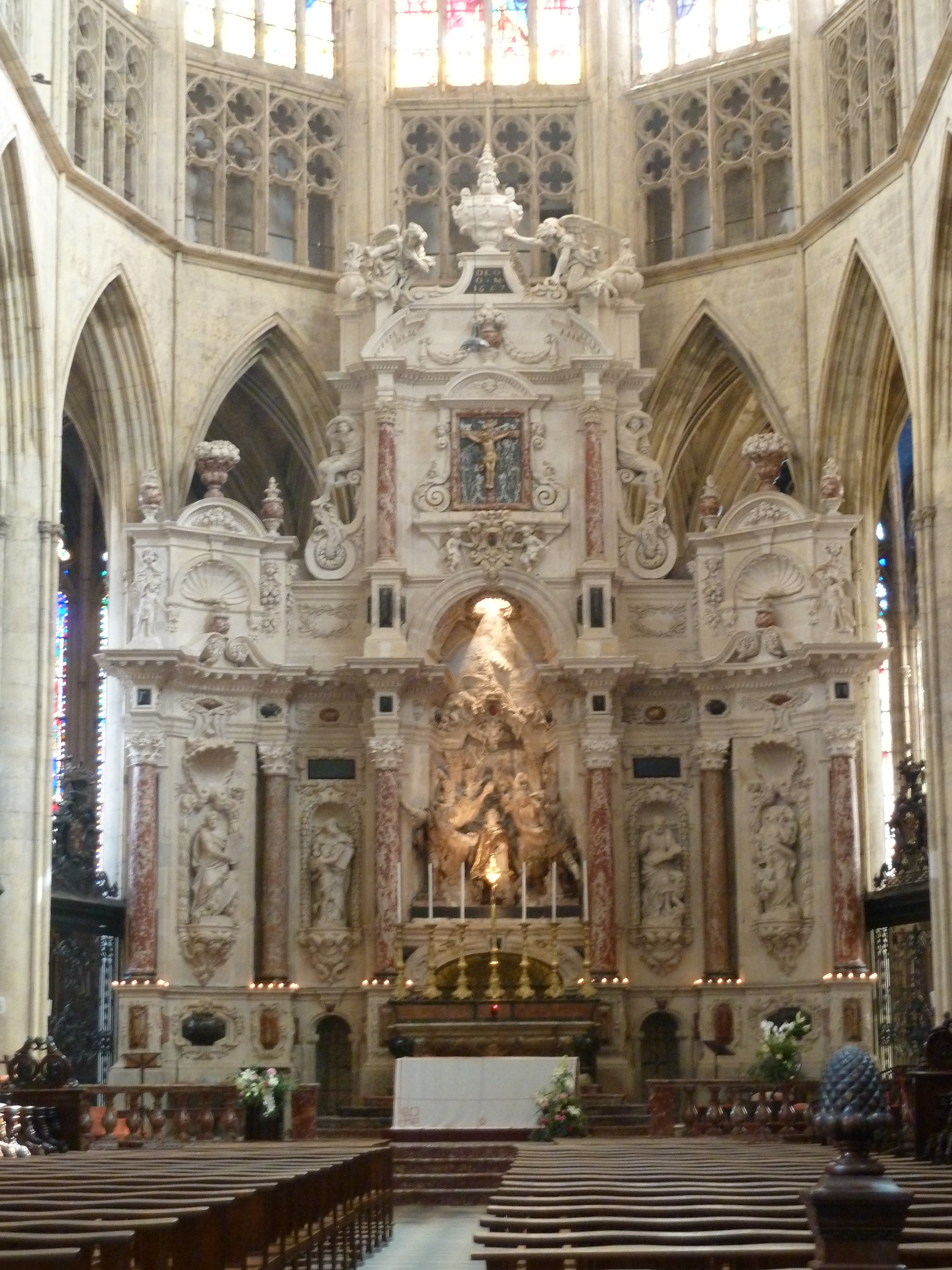
The marble retable or altarpiece of the choir (1667–1680)

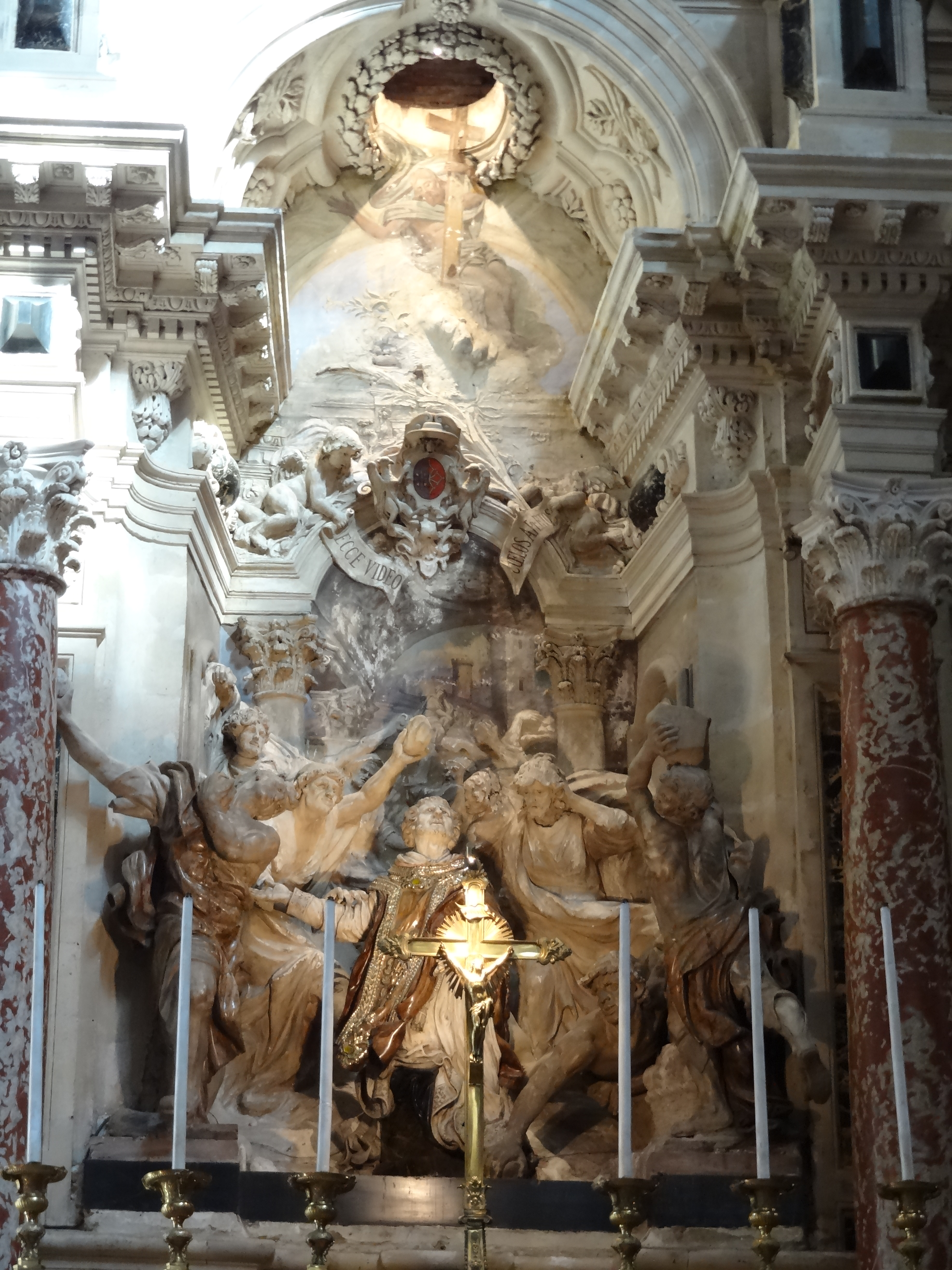
Detail of the retable – the stoning of Saint Stephen

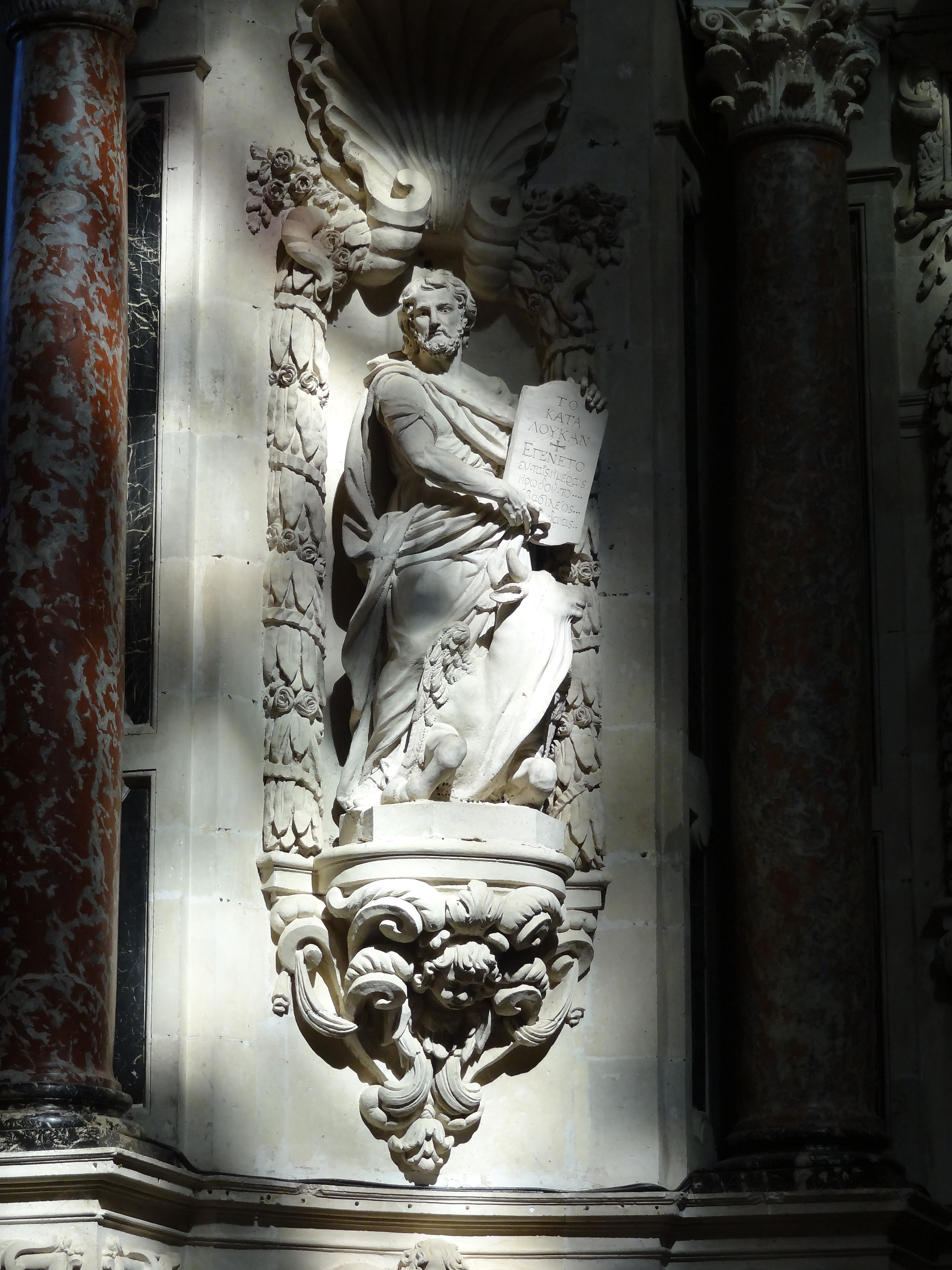
Detail of the retable; Saint Luke with a bull

The grand retable or altarpiece in the choir is an example of the 17th redecoration in the Baroque style. The redecoration was varied out between 1667 and 1680 by the architect Pierre Mercier and the sculptor Gervais Drouet. Placed behind the altar, the retable has three levels of sculpture, depicting the stoning of Saint Stephen, the first Christian martyr. The work is filled with twisting movement and action. In the last part of the 17th century the other chapels were given similar decoration and marble retables.

== Bells ==
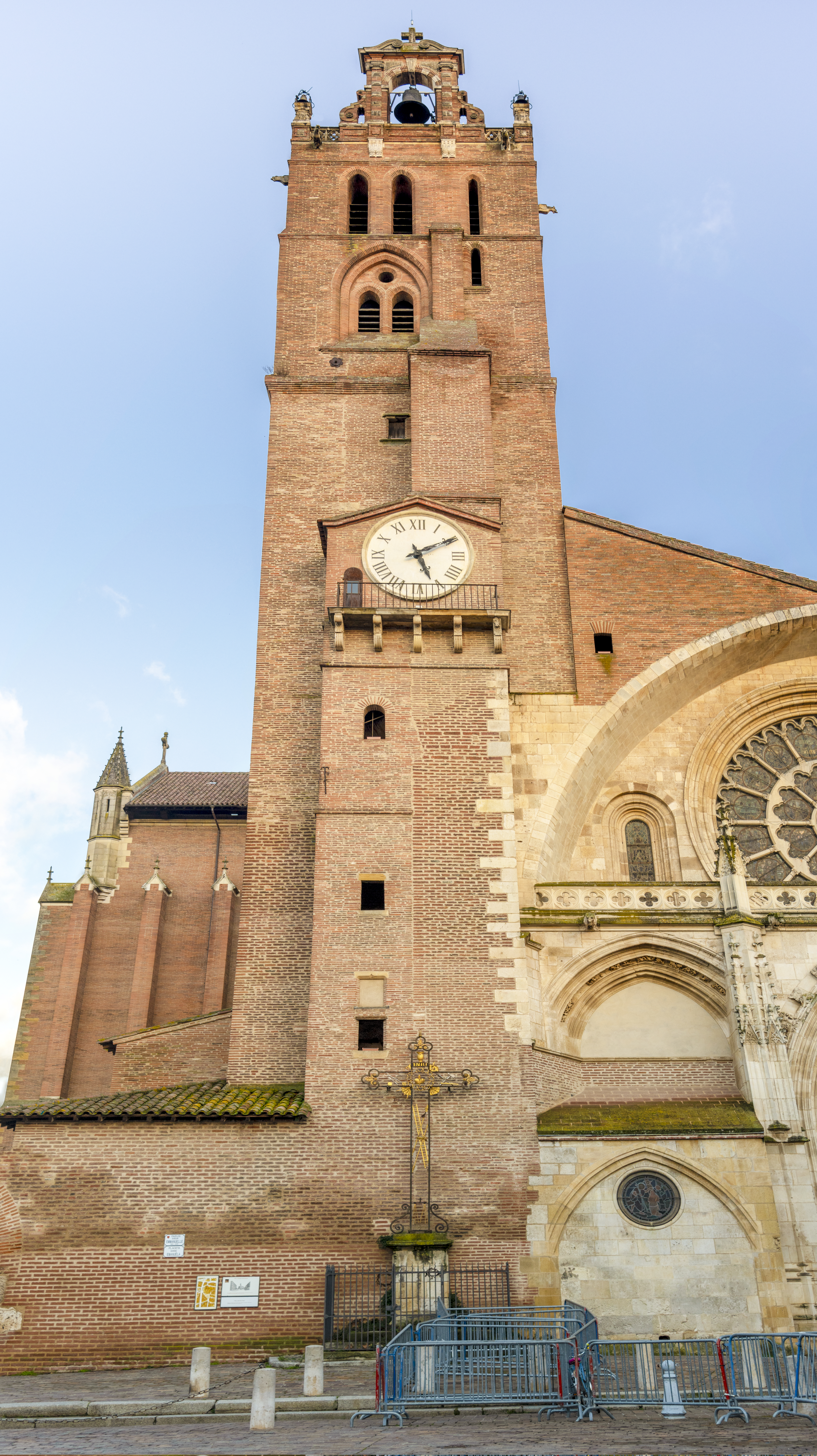
The bell tower

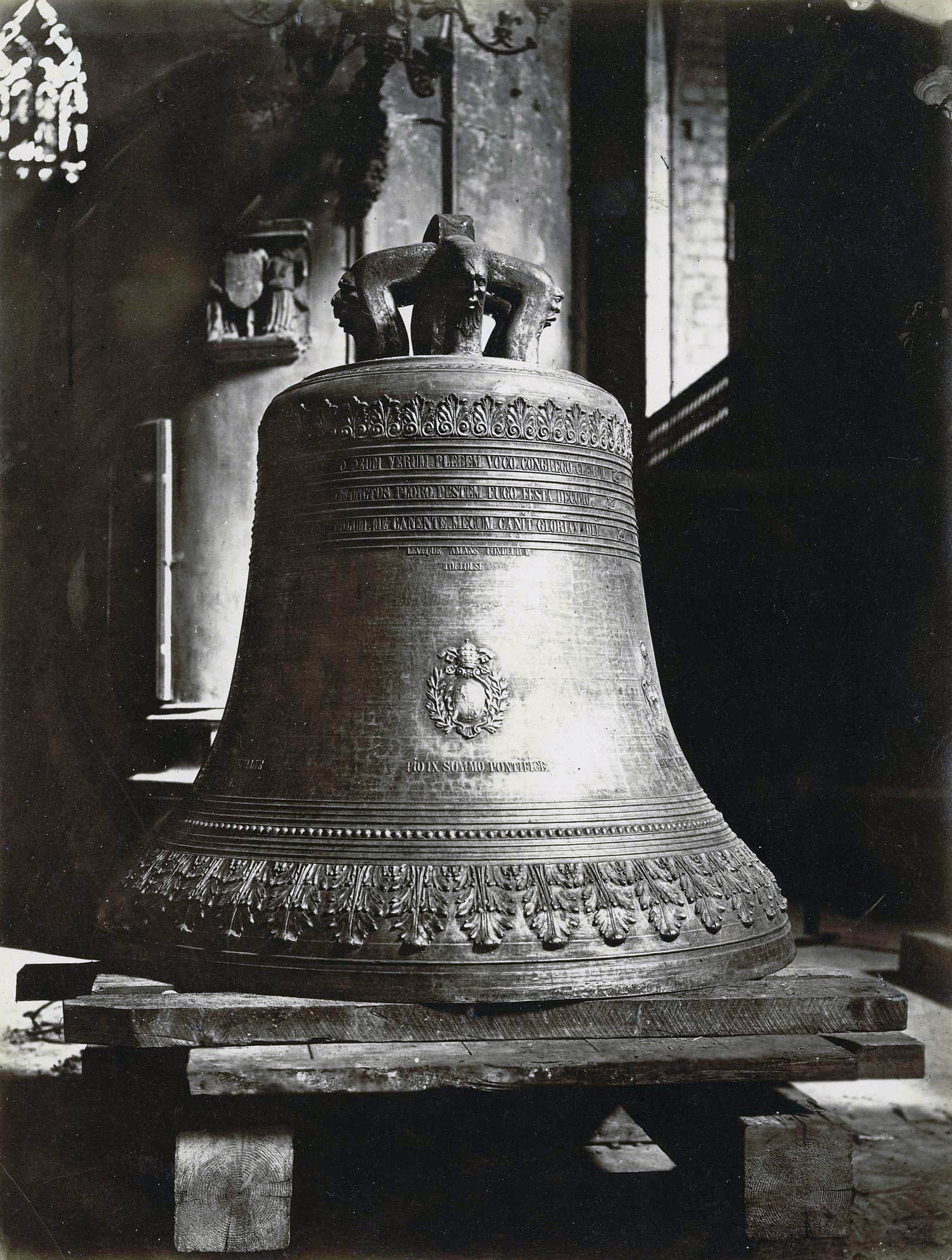
The largest bell, named Etienne-Florian (1876)

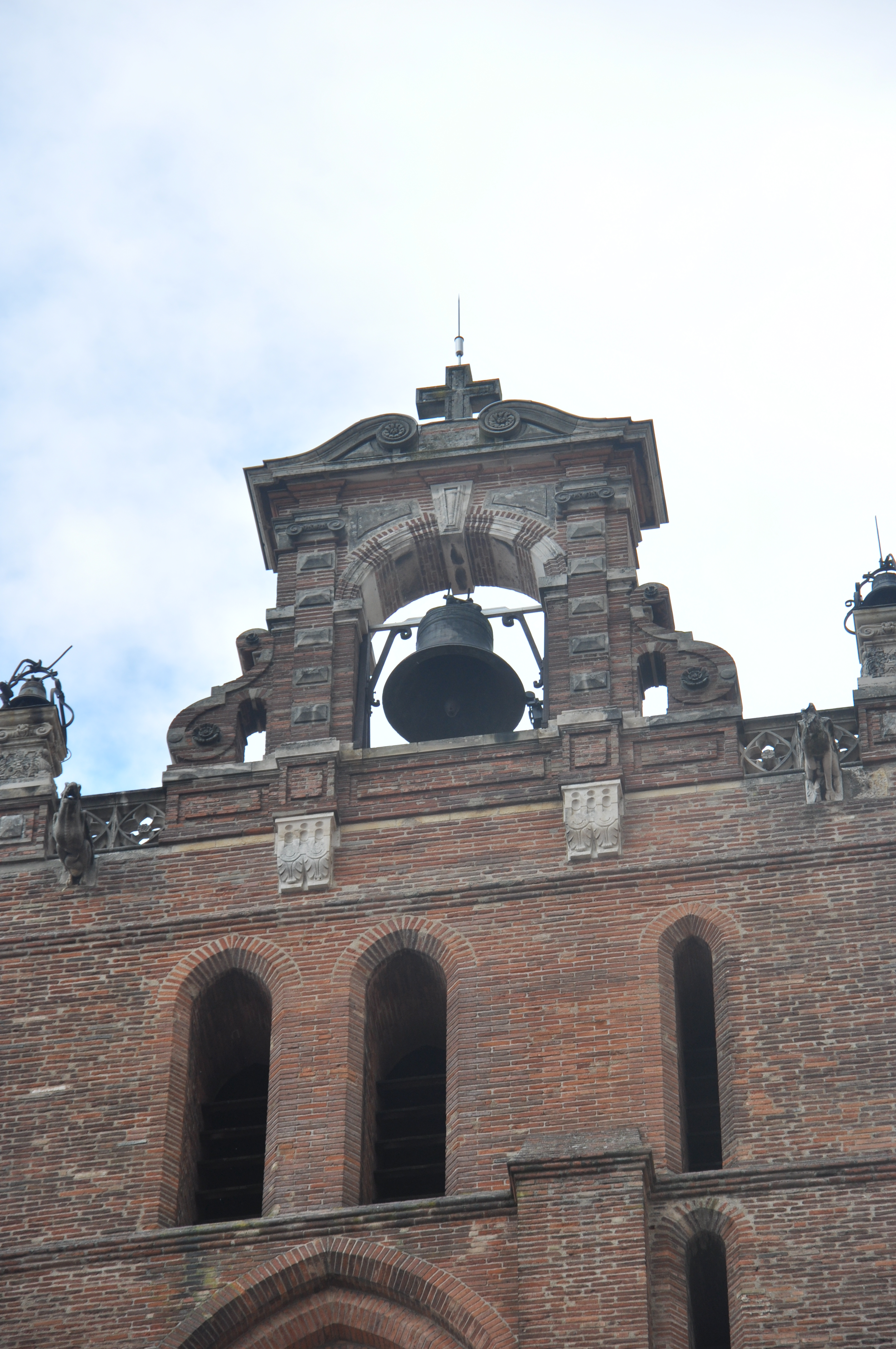
Top of the bell tower

The bells, like those of many French cathedrals, have had a complicated history. The bell tower of the 16th century had seventeen bells for religious purposes, plus an additional three for civil purposes, such as alerting the public of fires or approaching enemies. These were located at the top of the bell tower. There was an additional bell belonging to the chapter in the smaller bell tower of the nave, and another small bell in the sacristy. All seventeen religious bells were removed during the Revolution and melted down.

A new collection of bells was gradually assembled, reaching thirteen bells played by a keyboard and six rung by hand. Today the bells can also be rung by a small electronic keyboard, located in the sacristy at the opposite end of the cathedral.

The bourdon, the largest bell today, is called Etienne-Florian. It was cast in 1876 in Toulouse, has a diameter of 1.84 meters, and weighs 3.9 tons.

== Organs ==
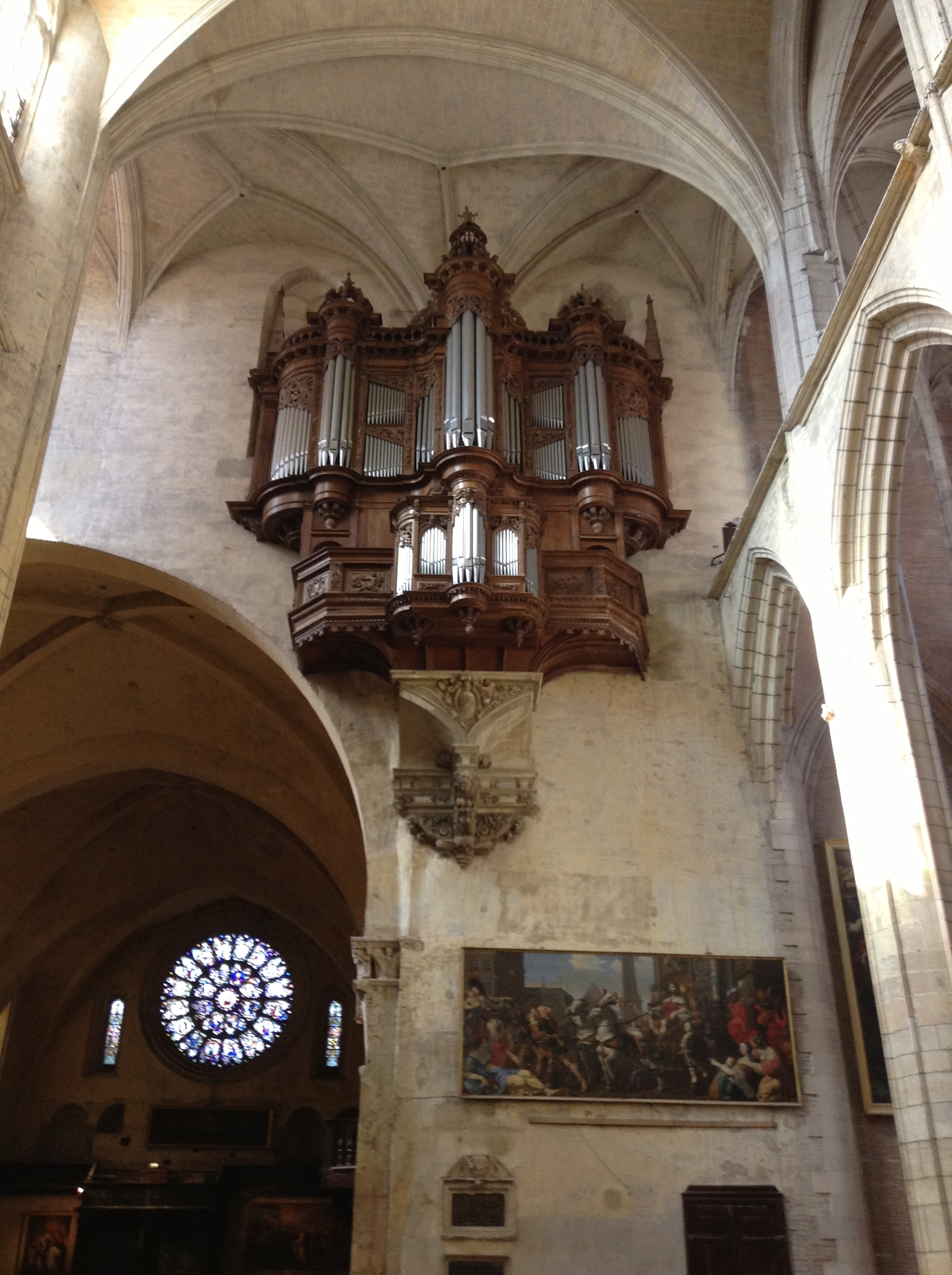
The tribune organ seen from below

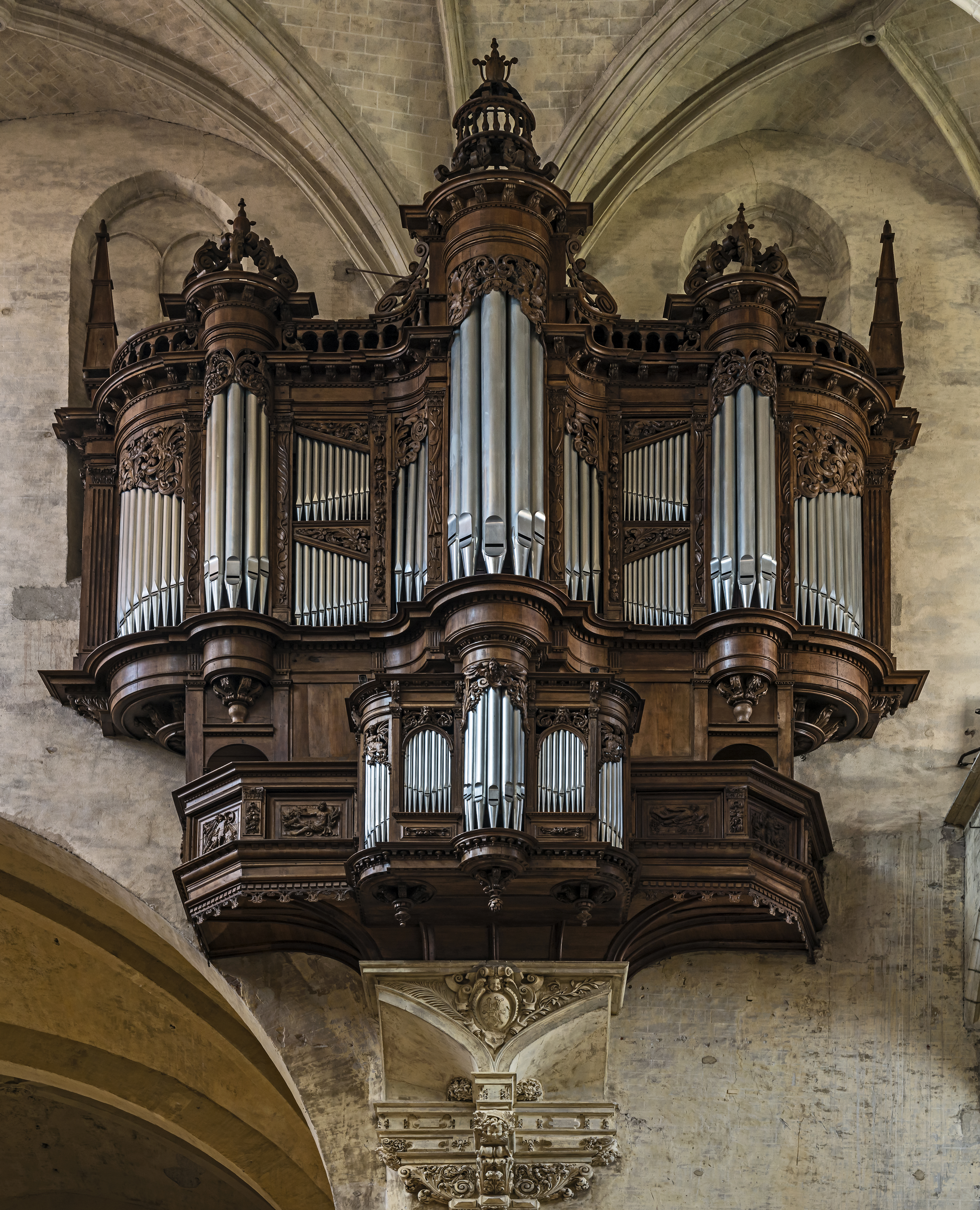
The organ of the tribune

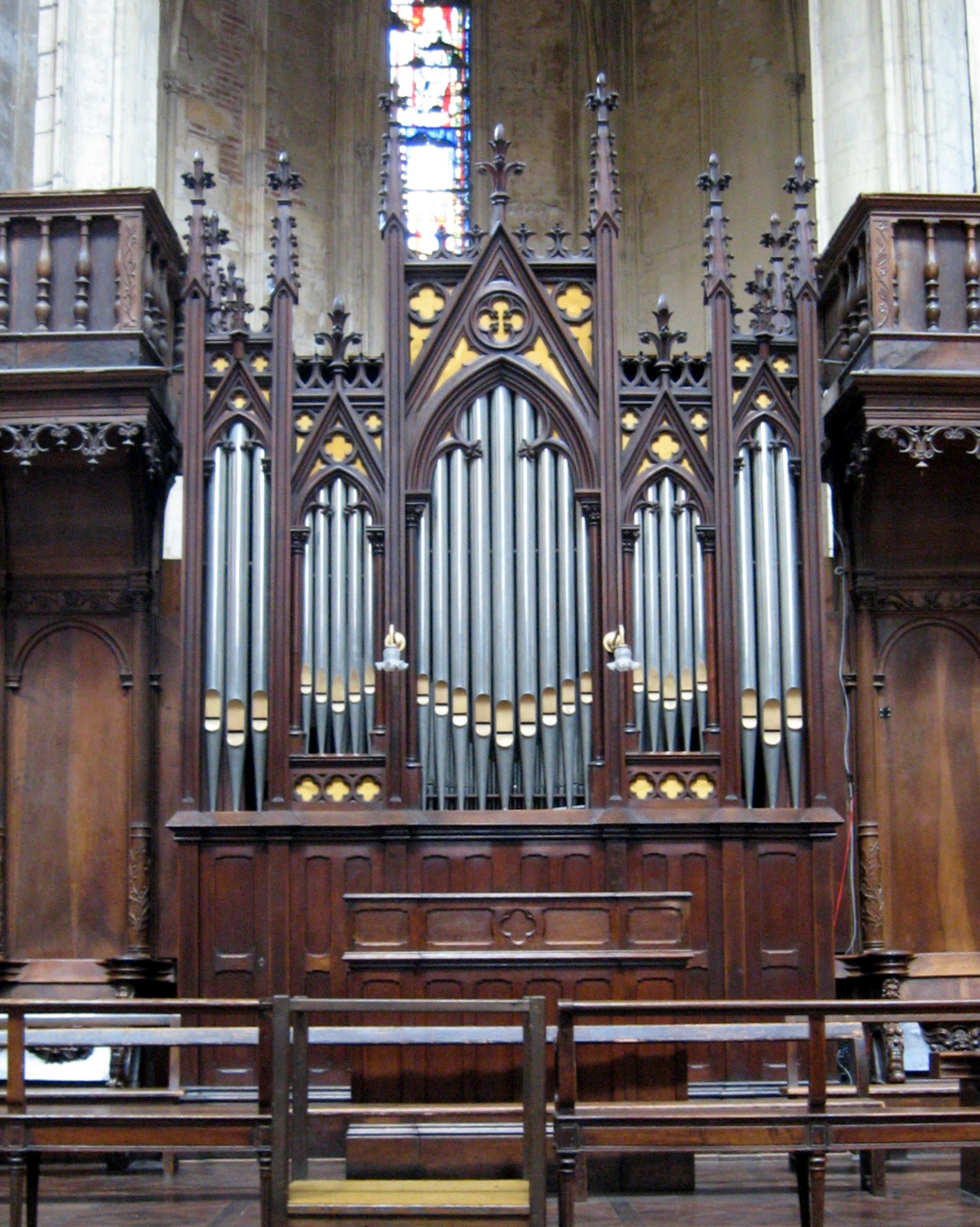
The choir organ, set in the midst of the choir stalls

The cathedral has two organs, a large one in the tribune and a smaller one in the choir. The first organ was commissioned by the archbishop Bernard de Rousergue (1451–1475). He also was responsible for enlarging the choir to the northwest, building the chapel at the south entrance of the choir (The Chapel of the Agony), and for the carved choir stalls.

The current tribune organ L'orgue was built in 1612, with woodwork by Antoine Lefèbvre, with additions made in 1677 by Jean de Joyeuse, then further additions in 1738 par Pierre de Montbrun. It underwent a series of reconstructions and restorations in the 18th and 19th century, particularly in 1852. The 1852 reconstruction preserved, as much as possible the pipes of the original organ, while installing mechanical pumps. The most recent restoration was in 1977. The organ is classified in the Palissy database as an object of historical importance.

The tribune organ weighs thirteen tons, and is twelve meters high and ten wide. It rises seventeen meters above the floor, suspended from the wall just below the vaults, resting on a small ledge, in what is called "The swallow's nest" ("Nid de Hirondelle"). It has forty-seven stops on four manual keyboards, and a set of foot pedals. The transmissions of the keyboards and stops are mechanical.

The choir organ was made by Aristide Cavaillé-Coll and installed in 1868. It has twelve stops and two keyboards, and a bank of pedals. The transmissions to the pipes are mechanical. Like the tribune organ, it is classified in the Base Palissy as an object of historical importance.

== See also ==
- French Gothic architecture
- Gothic cathedrals and churches
- List of Gothic Cathedrals in Europe

== Bibliography (in French) ==
- Lours, Mathieu (2018). Dictionnaire des Cathédrales (in French). Editions Jean-Paul Gisserot. ISBN 978-27558-0765-3.
- Wenzler, Claude (2018). Cathédales Cothiques - un Défi Médiéval (in French). Éditions Ouest-France. ISBN 978-2-7373-7712-9.
- Le Guide du Patrimoine en France (in French). Éditions du Patrimoine, Centre des Monuments Nationaux. 2002. ISBN 978-2-85822-760-0.

== Sites on the history and art of the Cathedral (in French) ==
- Official website (in French)
- Website concerning the cathedral's history and artwork (in French)
- Cathédrale Saint-Étienne – Ministère de la Culture
- Archives de Toulouse : La cathédrale Saint-Étienne
- Cathédrale Saint-Étienne de Toulouse at Structurae
- Toulouse et la brique – La cathédrale Saint-Étienne
- Place Saint-Étienne et Cathédrale Saint-Étienne – patrimoines.midipyrenees.fr (fichier pdf)
- La Cathédrale Saint-Étienne et l'orgue, Toulouse – musiqueorguequebec.ca
