= Hilary (name) =

- Gender: Unisex

Origin
- Origin: Greek and Latin
- Meaning: Cheerful, happy

Other names
- Alternative spelling: Hillary
- Related names: Eleri, Hilario, Hilarion, Hilarius, Ilaria, Ilario, Ilarion, Illarion

Hilary, Hilarie, or Hillary is a given name and surname, derived from the Latin hilarius meaning "cheerful", from hilaris, "cheerful, merry", which comes from the Greek ἱλαρός (hilaros), "cheerful, merry", which in turn comes from ἵλαος (hilaos), "propitious, gracious". Ilaria is the popular Italian feminine form, while Ilario is the Italian masculine one. Other male forms are Hilarion, Ilarion, and Illarion.

In the 1990s and first few decades of the twenty-first century, the name was strongly associated in the United States with Hillary Clinton. Its popularity for newborn American girls dropped rapidly during the beginning of her husband's presidency of the United States.

== Notable men with the given name ==
- Hilary the Deacon (fl. mid-4th century), churchman and theologian
- Pope Hilarius or Hilary (died 468), Catholic pope and saint
- Hilary of Arles, 5th-century bishop and saint
- Hilary of Chichester (c. 1110–1169), bishop of Chichester
- Hilary of Galeata, 6th century hermit
- Hilary of Poitiers or Saint Hilarius, 4th-century bishop and Church Father
- Hilary Benn (born 1953), British politician
- Hillary Bor (born 1989), Kenyan-American athlete
- Hillary Butler (born 1971), American football player
- Hilary Davan Wetton (born 1943), British conductor
- Hillary "Hilly" Hathaway (born 1969), American baseball player
- Hilary A. Herbert (1834–1919), American politician
- Hilary Jenkinson (1882–1961), British archivist and archival theorist
- Hilary R. W. Johnson (1837–1901), 11th President of Liberia
- Hilary Jones (disambiguation), multiple people
- Hilary Knight (born 1926), author, illustrator
- Hilary Koprowski (1916–2013), Polish virologist and immunologist
- Hillary Makasa (born 1976), Zambian footballer
- Hilary Marquand (1901−1972), British politician
- Hillary Menard (born 1934), Canadian ice hockey player
- Hilary Minster (1944–1999), British actor
- Hilary Minc (1905−1974), Polish economist and politician
- Hillary Ngetich (born 1995), Kenyan middle-distance runner
- Hilary Putnam (1926−2016), American philosopher
- Hilary Skarżyński (1925–1987), Polish ice hockey player
- Hillary Waugh (1920–2008), American novelist
- Hillary Yego (born 1992), Kenyan steeplechase runner
- Hilary Hinton Ziglar or Zig Ziglar (1926–2012), motivational speaker

== Notable women with the given name ==
- Hilary (musician) (1950–2007), American singer-songwriter
- Hilary Allcroft (1943–2024), English writer, producer and director
- Hillary Diane Andales, Filipino astrophysicist and science communicator
- Hilary Armstrong (born 1945), British politician
- Hilary Barry, New Zealand television journalist
- Hilary Bell (disambiguation), multiple people
- Hilary Bok (born 1950), American academic and writer
- Hilary Bonner (born 1950), British writer
- Hillary Brooke (1914–1999), American actress
- Hilarie Burton (born 1982), American actress/producer
- Hillary Carlip (born 1956), American novelist
- Hilary Claire (1941–2007), English–South African anti-apartheid activist, writer
- Hillary Rodham Clinton (born 1947), American senator and Secretary of State 2009–2013
- Hilary Cruz (born 1988), American actress, model and beauty queen
- Hilary Davies (born 1960), English poet
- Hilary Devey (1957–2022), English businesswoman and television personality
- Hilary du Pré (born 1942), British musician
- Hilary Duff (born 1987), American actress and singer
- Hilary Hahn (born 1979), American violinist
- Hillary Hall (born 1965), American politician
- Hillary Howard, American reporter
- Hillary Pugh Kent, American politician
- Hilary Knight (born 1989), American ice hockey player
- Hilary Lapsley (born 1949), New Zealand author and psychologist
- Hilary Liftin (born 1969), American author
- Hilarie Lindsay (1922–2021), Australian toy manufacturer and writer
- Hillary Lindsey, country music songwriter
- Hilarie Mais (born 1952), British/Australian artist
- Hilary Mantel (1952–2022), British novelist
- Hilary D. Marston, American physician-scientist and global health policy advisor
- Hilary Mason (1917–2006), English actress
- Hilaree Nelson (1972–2022), American ski mountaineer
- Hilary Ockendon, British mathematician
- Hilary Pecis (born 1979), American artist
- Hilary B. Price (born 1969), creator of the comic strip Rhymes with Orange
- Hillary Raphael (born 1976), American novelist
- Hilary Rhoda (born 1987), American model
- Hillary Scholten (born 1982), American politician
- Hillary Scott (born 1986), American singer-songwriter
- Hillary Scott, (born 1983) American pornographic actress
- Hilarie Sidney, American musician
- Hillary B. Smith (born 1957), American actress
- Hillary Super, American business executive
- Hilary Swank (born 1974), American actress
- Hilary Swarts, American wildlife biologist
- Hillary Tuck (born 1978), American actress
- Hilary Van Dyke (born 1970), American actress and singer
- Hilary Weston (1942–2025), Irish-born Canadian businesswoman and politician
- Hillary Wolf (born 1977), American child actress and Olympic Judoka

== People with this family name ==
- Darius Hillary (born 1993), American football player
- Edmund Hillary (1919–2008), New Zealand mountaineer
- Jennifer Hilary (1942–2008), British actress
- Lynn Hilary (born 1982), Irish singer and guitarist
- Peter Hillary (born 1954), Sir Edmund's son, New Zealand adventurer
- Richard Hillary (1919−1943), Australian/British fighter pilot and author
- William Hillary (1771–1847), Founder of the Royal National Lifeboat Institution

== Fictional characters ==
- Captain Hilary Duff, a character from the TV series The High Life
- Hillary, a recurring character in the TV series Kyle XY
- Hilary Banks, in the TV series The Fresh Prince of Bel-Air
- Hilary Becker, a captain in the TV series Primeval
- Hilary Briss, part of the comedy quartet The League of Gentlemen
- Hilary Burde, the first-person narrator of Iris Murdoch's A Word Child
- Hilary Curtis in the soap opera The Young and the Restless
- Hilary Friedman, in the film Blended
- Hilary Higgenbottom, a character from The Mighty B!
- Hilary Norm Peterson, in the TV series Cheers
- Hilary Robinson, a character from the Australian soap opera Neighbours
- Hilary Tachibana, in the Beyblade anime series
- Hillary Whitney, protagonist in the 1988 movie Beaches, played by Barbara Hershey
- Hillary the Owl, a female Great Grey Owl from Jim Henson's Animal Show

== See also ==
- Saint Hilaria, daughter of Roman Emperor Zeno and saint in the Eastern Christian churches
- Hilary (disambiguation)
  - List of storms named Hilary, multiple tropical cyclones of the same name
- Saint-Hilaire (disambiguation)
- Ilar and Eleri, Welsh forms of this name
