= Ilario =

Ilario is an Italian given name. Borrowed from Latin Hilarius, cognate to English Hilary and Hillary. It may refer to:

== People ==
- Ilario Aloe (born 1986), Italian footballer who last played for A.P.D. Ribelle 1927
- Ilario Antoniazzi (born 1948), archbishop of the Archdiocese of Tunis since February 21, 2013
- Ilario Bandini (1911–1992), Italian businessman, racing driver, and racing car manufacturer
- Ilario Castagner (born 1940), Italian football manager and former player
- Ilario Di Buò (born 1965), Italian archer, formerly ranked number one in the world
- Ilario Cao (Hilarius Caius), Sardinian ecclesiastic active in Rome during the first thirty years of the eleventh century
- Ilario Carposio (1852–1921), artistic photographer who owned an important studio in Fiume, now Rijeka in present-day Croatia
- Ilario Casolano (1588–1661), Italian painter of the Baroque period
- Ugolino di Prete Ilario, Italian painter
- Ilario Lamberti (born 1988), Italian footballer
- Ilario Lanivi, Italian politician involved in the formation of a number of political parties
- Ilario Lanna (born 1990), Italian footballer
- Ilario Pantano (born 1971), former United States Marine Corps second lieutenant
- Ilario Passerini (born 1952), Italian sprint canoeist who competed in the mid-1970s
- Ilario Pegorari (1949–1982), Italian alpine skier
- Ilario Spolverini (1657–1734), Italian painter
- Ilario Tranquillo, Italian author of a book on the ancient Napizia, later Pizzo
- Ilario Zannino (1920–1996), member of the Patriarca crime family

== See also ==
- Ilario, A Story of the First History, two novels by Mary Gentle, set in an alternate history
- Hilario
- Ilaro
- Ilarion
- Illarion
- Ilaria
