= Hilary =

Hilary or Hillary may refer to:

- Hilary (name), or Hilarie or Hillary, a given name and surname (includes list of name-holders)
  - Hillary Clinton, American politician
  - Edmund Hillary, one of the first to summit Mount Everest
- Hillary Coast, Antarctica
- Hilary term, the spring term at the Universities of Oxford and Dublin
- Hikari no Densetsu, a 1985 manga series, known in Italian as Hilary
- Hillary (film), a 2020 American documentary film about Hillary Clinton
- HMS Hilary
- Hilary: the brave world of Hilary Pole, 1972 book by Dorothy Clarke Wilson
- List of storms named Hilary, the name of several storms
- Hillary Montes, a mountain range on Pluto

== See also ==
- Hillery (disambiguation)
- Saint Hilary (disambiguation)
- Saint-Hilaire (disambiguation)
- Ilar (disambiguation), Welsh form of the name Hilary
- Eleri (disambiguation), Welsh form of the name Hilarus
- Hillarys, Western Australia
