= Ellery =

Ellery may refer to:

- Ellery (duo), an American pop group
- Ellery (given name)
- Ellery (surname)
- Ellery, New York, a US town
- Ellery, Illinois, a US town

== See also ==
- Ellery Lake, a lake in Ontario, Canada
- Mount Ellery, Australia
- Mount Ellery (Antarctica)
- Ellery Bop, a 1980s British pop group
- Eleri (disambiguation)
- Elery (disambiguation)
- Ellery Queen (disambiguation)
