= Ilaria (given name) =

Ilaria is an Italian female given name, equivalent to the English names Hilary or Hillary. Ilaria is derived from the Latin hilarius meaning "cheerful", from hilaris, "cheerful, merry". Ilaria was the eighth most popular name for Italian baby girls born in 2006. Notable people with the name include:

- Ilaria Alpi (1961–1994), Italian journalist
- Ilaria Arrighetti (born 1993), Italian rugby player
- Ilaria Bacciocchi (born 1990), Sammarinese politician
- Ilaria Bianchi (born 1990), Italian swimmer
- Ilaria Bianco (born 1980), Italian fencer
- Ilaria Borrelli (born 1968), Italian actress end scriptwriter
- Ilaria Caprioglio (born 1969), Italian politician
- Ilaria Cavo (born 1973), Italian politician
- Ilaria D'Amico (born 1973), Italian television presenter
- Ilaria del Carretto (1379–1405), Italian noblewoman
- Ilaria Fontana (born 1984), Italian politician
- Ilaria Graziano (born 1985), Italian singer
- Ilaria Käslin (born 1997), Swiss gymnast
- Ilaria Mauro (born 1988), Italian football player
- Ilaria Occhini (1934–2019), Italian actress
- Ilaria Tufari (born 1980), Italian architect
- Ilaria Pascucci, Italian astrophysicist
- Ilaria Salis (born 1984), Italian politician and activist
- Ilaria Spada (born 1981), Italian actress

== See also ==
- Hilary (name)
- Ilario
