= Free Catholic Church in Germany =

The Free Catholic Church in Germany (German: Freikatholische Kirche in Deutschland) is a Christian religious community in Germany which was legally registered in 1987. (Note: According to Religious Studies Media and Information Service in Germany which did research and a literature review in 2005, Free Catholic Church in Germany was affiliated with ICAB and it had a membership of 412 in Germany. In 2006, Free Catholic Church in Germany was not listed as affiliated with ICAB through Igrejas Católicas e Apostólicas Nacionais (ICAN) on the ICAB website. In 2009, Free Catholic Church in Germany was not listed as affiliated with ICAB through the Worldwide Communion of Catholic Apostolic Churches on the ICAB website. As of 2015, Free Catholic Church in Germany was not listed as a mission outside of Brazil on the ICAB website.)

Johannes Peter Meyer-Mendez brought the Brazilian Catholic Apostolic Church (ICAB) to Germany in 1949. It was registered as the Free Catholic Church ("Freikatholische Kirche").

After Meyer-Mendez died, Georg Fröbrich became the leader, then Hilarios Karl-Heinz Ungerer became the leader and moved from Cologne to Munich.

In 1972, Ungerer opened a storefront church in Munich; over the next 25 years he endeavoured to integrate marginal groups into the church.
