= Johannes Peter Meyer-Mendez =

Johannes Peter Meyer-Mendez (March 6, 1909 in Randerath, Germany – February 24, 1976 in Cologne) was the founder and first archbishop of the Free Catholic Church in Germany. He founded this church in 1949 as an extension of the Brazilian Catholic Apostolic Church. Upon his death, he was succeeded Bishop Georg Fröbrich later as Archbishop by Hilarios Karl-Heinz Ungerer.
