= Metropolitan Hilarion =

Metropolitan Hilarion or Ilarion may refer to:

- Hilarion of Kiev, 11th century churchman of the Kievian Rus, became Metropolitan of Kiev
- Hilarion (Alfeyev) (born 1966), metropolitan of Budapest and Hungary, former chairman of the Department of External Church Relations of the Patriarchate of Moscow; theologian, church historian and composer
- Hilarion (Kapral) (1948-2022) former Metropolitan of Eastern America and New York and First Hierarch of the Russian Orthodox Church Outside Russia
- Hilarion (Ohienko) (1882–1972), Ukrainian churchman, became Metropolitan of Canada
- Hilarion (Rudnyk) (born 1972), Metropolitan of the autonomous Ukrainian Orthodox Church of Canada
- Hilarion (Serafimovski) (born 1973), Metropolitan of Diocese of Bregalica, Republic of Macedonia

== See also ==
- Hilarion (name)
- Ilarion
