= Elery (disambiguation) =

Elery may refer to:

- Elery, Ohio, an unincorporated community in Henry County, in the U.S. state of Ohio
- Elery Hanley, English former rugby league player and coach
- Elery Hamilton-Smith, Australian interdisciplinary scholar and academic
- Elery "Ed" Guy Greathouse, American boxer
- Lawrence Elery Wilson, American businessman and politician
- Elery's tube-nosed bat, a species of common bats first discovered in a forest of northern Vietnam.
- Sharon Elery Rogers, an American composer

== See also ==
- Ellery (disambiguation)
