= Carlip =

Carlip is a surname. Notable people with the surname include:

- Hillary Carlip (born 1956), American author and artist
- Steve Carlip (born 1953), American physicist

== See also ==
- Carlin (name)
