= Illarion =

Illarion (Russian: Илларион) or Ilarion (Иларион) is a Russian first name, a transliteration of the Greek name "Ἱλαρίων". It is shared by the following individuals:

- Illarion Ivanov-Schitz (1865–1937), Russian/Soviet architect
- Illarion Mgeladze (1890–1941, a.k.a. Ilya Vardin), Georgian Marxist revolutionary writer
- Illarion Pryanishnikov (1840–1894), Russian painter
- Illarion Vasilchikov (1805–1862), Imperial Russian general
- Count Illarion Ivanovich Vorontsov-Dashkov (1837–1916), Russian politician

== See also ==
- Ilarion (name)
- Hilario (name)
- Hilarion (name)
- Hilary (name)
- Larion
