= Victoria's Secret =

American lingerie and cosmetics retailer

Victoria's Secret & Co.

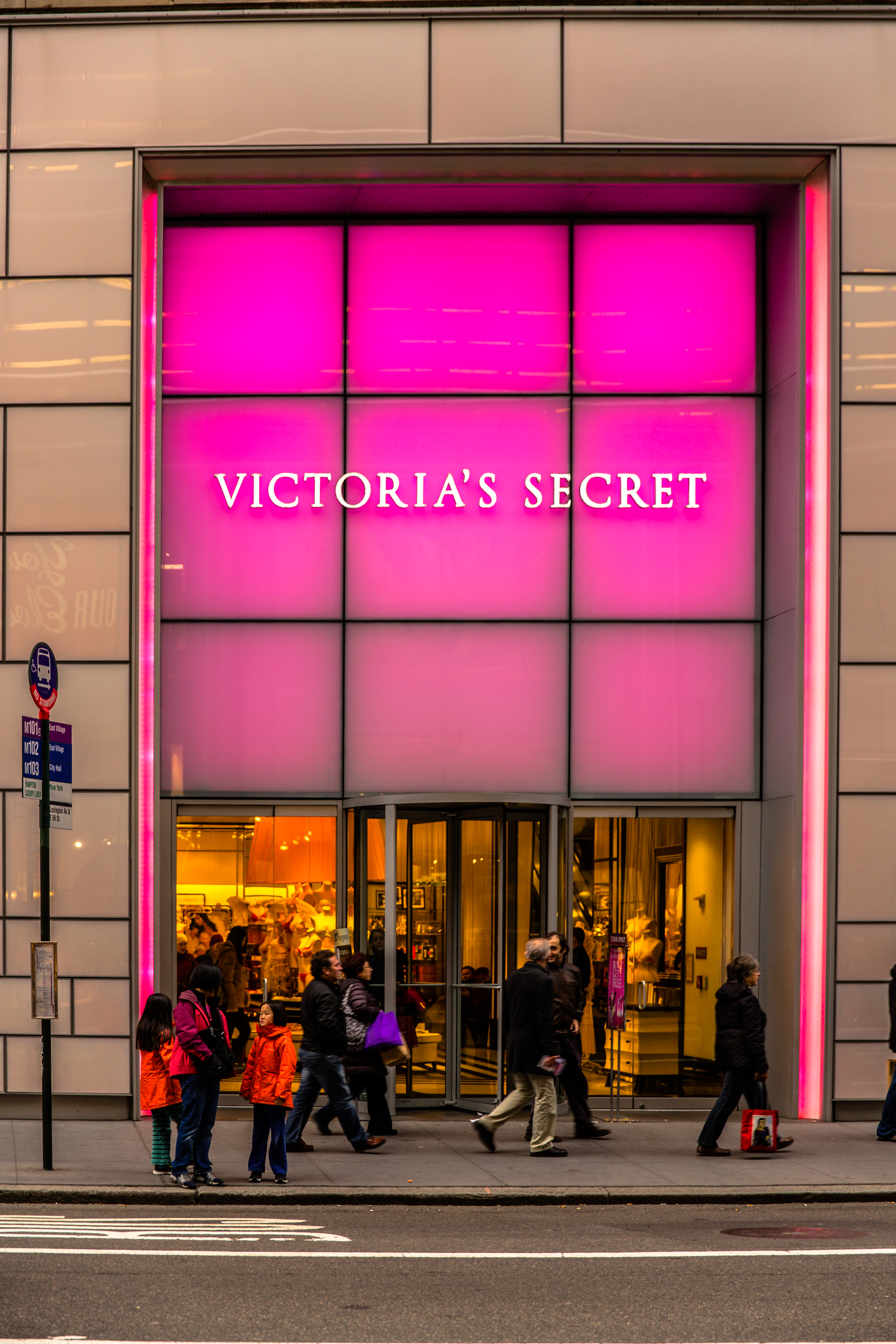
- Lexington Ave storefront in New York, 2012
- Type: Public
- Traded as: NYSE: VSXY; S&P 600 component
- Industry: Apparel
- Founded: June 12, 1977; 49 years ago Stanford Shopping Center, Palo Alto, California, US
- Founders: Roy Raymond; Gaye Raymond
- Headquarters: Reynoldsburg, Ohio, US
- Number of locations: 1,420 (2025)
- Areas served: Primarily United States and Canada
- Key people: Hillary Super (CEO); Anne Stephenson (President of Victoria's Secret); Ali Dillion (President of PINK); Amy Kocourek (President of Beauty); Scott Sekella (CFO and COO)
- Products: Lingerie; underwear; cosmetics; fragrances
- Brands: Victoria's Secret; PINK; Beauty
- Revenue: ▲US$6.55 billion (2025)
- Operating income: ▼US$271 million (2025)
- Net income: ▼US$161 million (2025)
- Total assets: ▲US$5.01 billion (2025)
- Total equity: ▲US$910 million (2025)
- Number of employees: 33,000 (2026)
- Website: victoriassecret.com
- Footnotes; Financial data for fiscal year from February 2, 2025, to January 31, 2026

Victoria's Secret is an American lingerie, clothing and beauty retailer. Founded in 1977 by Stanford graduate student Roy Raymond and his wife Gaye, the company's five lingerie stores were sold to Les Wexner in 1982. Wexner rapidly expanded into American shopping malls, expanding the company into 350 stores nationally with sales of $1 billion by the early 1990s, when Victoria's Secret became the largest lingerie retailer in the United States.

Since 1995, the Victoria's Secret Fashion Show has been a major part of the brand's image, featuring an annual runway spectacle of models promoted by the company as fantasy Angels. The 1990s saw the company's further expansion throughout shopping malls, along with the introduction of the 'miracle bra', the brand Body by Victoria, and the development of a line of fragrances and cosmetics. In 2002, Victoria's Secret announced the launch of PINK, a brand that was aimed to teenagers and young women. Starting in 2008, Victoria's Secret expanded internationally, with retail outlets within international airports, franchises in major cities overseas, and company-owned stores throughout Canada and the UK.

By 2016, Victoria's Secret's market share had begun to decrease, due to competition from other brands that embraced a wider range of sizes and a growing consumer preference for athleisure. In 2016, the company canceled the circulation of its catalog. The brand struggled to maintain its market position following criticism and controversy over the unsavory behavior and business practices of corporate leadership under Wexner and Ed Razek. As of May 2020, with over 1,070 stores, Victoria's Secret remained the largest lingerie retailer in the United States.

Until 2021, Victoria's Secret was part of the L Brands group. On August 3, 2021, Victoria's Secret was spun off as an independent company under the name Victoria's Secret & Co. (which trades on the NYSE under the ticker symbol VSXY).

== History ==
=== 1977–1981 ===
Victoria's Secret was founded by Roy Raymond, and his wife, Gaye Raymond, on June 12, 1977. The first store was opened in Stanford Shopping Center in Palo Alto, California. Years earlier, Raymond had been embarrassed when purchasing lingerie for his wife at a department store. Newsweek reported Roy Raymond stating: "When I tried to buy lingerie for my wife, I was faced with racks of terry-cloth robes and ugly floral-print nylon nightgowns, and I always had the feeling the department store saleswomen thought I was an unwelcome intruder." Raymond reportedly spent the next eight years studying the lingerie market.

At the time when the Raymonds founded Victoria's Secret, the undergarments market in the U.S. was dominated by pragmatic items from Fruit of the Loom, Hanes, and Jockey, often sold in packs of three at department stores, while lingerie was reserved for special occasions such as one's honeymoon. Considered niche products, lingerie items (such as lacy thongs and padded push-up bras) were only found in specialty shops like Frederick's of Hollywood, located "alongside feathered boas and provocative pirate costumes". In 1977, Raymond borrowed $40,000 from family and $40,000 from a bank to establish Victoria's Secret: a store in which men could feel comfortable buying lingerie. The store was named in reference to Queen Victoria and the associated refinement of the Victorian era, while the "secret" was hidden underneath the clothes.

Victoria's Secret grossed $500,000 in its first year of business ($2.47 million in 2025), enough to finance the expansion from a headquarters and warehouse to four new store locations and a mail-order operation. The fourth store, added in 1982 at 395 Sutter Street in San Francisco, operated at that location until 1990, when it was moved to the larger Powell Street frontage of the Westin St. Francis.

In April 1982, Raymond sent out his 12th catalog at a cost to customers of $3 (equivalent to $10 in 2025); catalog sales accounted for 55% of the company's $7 million annual sales that year. Victoria's Secret was a minor player in the underwear market at this time, with the business described as "more burlesque than Main Street."

=== 1982–1990 ===
In 1982, Victoria's Secret had grown to five stores, a 40-page catalog, and was grossing $6 million annually. Raymond sold the company to Les Wexner, creator of Limited Stores Inc of Columbus, Ohio, for $1 million. In 1983, Wexner revamped Victoria's Secret's sales model towards a greater focus on female customers. Victoria's Secret transformed into a mainstay that sold broadly accepted underwear with "new colors, patterns and styles that promised sexiness packaged in a tasteful, glamorous way and with the snob appeal of European luxury" meant to appeal to female buyers. To further this image, the Victoria's Secret catalog continued the practice that Raymond began: listing the company's headquarters on catalogs at a fake London address, with the real headquarters in Columbus, Ohio. The stores were redesigned to evoke the Victorian era.

The New York Times reported in 1982 that the financial success of the Victoria's Secret catalog influenced other catalogs by presenting lingerie as "romantic and sensual but tasteful", "in which models are photographed in ladylike poses against elegant backgrounds." Howard Gross became president in 1985. In October of that year, the Los Angeles Times reported that Victoria's Secret was stealing market share from department stores; in 1986, Victoria's Secret was the only national chain devoted to lingerie.

The New York Times reported that Victoria's Secret swiftly expanded to 100 stores by 1986. and described it in 1987 as a "highly visible leader" that used "unabashedly sexy high-fashion photography to sell middle-priced underwear." In 1990, analysts estimated that sales had quadrupled in four years, making it one of the fastest growing mail-order businesses. Sales and profits from the catalog continued to expand due to the addition of clothing, swimwear and shoes and wider circulation.

Cynthia Fedus-Fields oversaw the company's direct business, including its catalog, from the mid-1980s until 2000. During her tenure, total revenues increased to nearly $1 billion. In 1987, Victoria's Secret was reported to be among the bestselling catalogs.

=== 1991–2005 ===
Victoria's Secret experienced quality problems with their product in the early 1990s and was working to resolve the issues. In 1991, Howard Gross was assigned to fix the L Brands subsidiary Limited Stores. In 1993, Business Week reported that both divisions suffered. Grace Nichols, who worked to improve the product quality, succeeded Gross. The company's margins tightened, resulting in slower growth in profits.

With the introduction of their own line of fragrances in 1991 and their entry into the billion-dollar cosmetics market in 1998, Victoria's Secret expanded beyond apparel in the 1990s.

Victoria's Secret introduced the 'Miracle Bra' in 1993, selling two million within the first year. When faced with competition from Sara Lee's WonderBra a year later, in 1994, the company responded with a TV campaign. At the same time, in 1994, Wexner discussed the creation of a company fashion event with Ed Razek. The first Victoria's Secret Fashion Show, held in 1995 in New York, became a mainstay for the company's image for the next 23 years.

By 1998, Victoria's Secret's market share of the intimate apparel market was 14 percent and the company also entered the $3.5 billion cosmetic market. The following year, in 1999, the company added the Body by Victoria line. The catalog had achieved "an almost cult-like following". In May 2000, Cynthia Fedus-Fields stepped down as CEO after delivering record profits in 1999 and early 2000. Fedus-Fields later claimed that, up until the time of her departure, the company had acted in accordance with the sensibilities of what a European woman would choose to wear. After her departure in 2000, the brand pursued an image that was "much more blatantly sexy."

In May 2000, Wexner installed Sharen Jester Turney, previously of Neiman Marcus Direct, as the new chief executive of Victoria's Secret Direct to turn around catalog sales that were lagging behind other divisions. Forbes reported Turney stating, "We need to quit focusing on all that cleavage." In 2000, Turney began to redefine Victoria's Secret catalog from "breasts—spilling over the tops of black, purple and reptile-print underthings" to one that would appeal to an "upscale customer who now feels more comfortable buying La Perla or Wolford lingerie."; "dimming the hooker looks" such as "tight jeans and stilettos"; and moving from "a substitute for Playboy in some dorm rooms," to something closer to a Vogue lifestyle layout, where lingerie, sleepwear, clothes and cosmetics appear throughout the catalog. Beginning in 2000, Grace Nichols, CEO of Victoria's Secret Direct, led a similar change at Victoria's Secret's stores—moving away from an evocation of 1800s England (or a Victorian bordello).

=== 2006–2020 ===
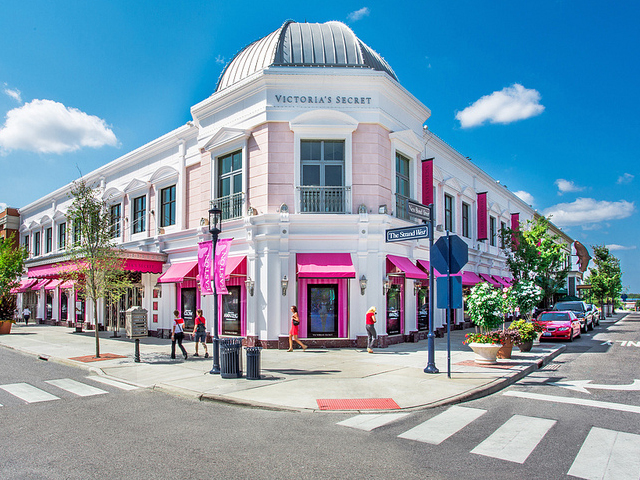
Victoria's Secret storefront in Columbus, Ohio, 2012

By 2006, Victoria's Secret's 1,000 stores across the United States accounted for one third of all purchases in the intimate apparel industry. In May 2006, Wexner promoted Turney from the Victoria's Secret catalog and online units to lead the whole company. In 2008, she acknowledged "product quality that doesn't equal the brand's hype." In September 2006, Victoria's Secret reportedly tried to make their catalog feel more like magazines by head-hunting writers from Women's Wear Daily.

The company had about a third of the market share in its category in 2013.

In February 2016, Turney stepped down as CEO of Victoria's Secret after being in the business for a decade. Victoria's Secret was split into three divisions: Victoria's Secret Lingerie, Victoria's Secret Beauty, and Pink, each with a separate CEO. In 2016, direct sales only grew 1.6% and fell by 7.4% in the last quarter of the year, typically a high revenue period due to the holidays. The company discontinued its use of a print catalog and dropped certain categories of clothing, such as swimwear. Sales revenue continued to stagnate and drop in early 2017.

In late 2018, CEO Jan Singer resigned amid declining sales. The Wall Street Journal reported that only one quarter showed an increase in same-store sales between 2016 and 2018. Singer's announcement came one week after CMO Ed Razek made a controversial comment that the company does not cast transgender or plus-size models in its annual fashion show "because the show is a fantasy." After a 40% stock plunge in a single year, Victoria's Secret announced the closure of 53 stores in the U.S. in 2019, as well as the relaunch of its swimwear line. L Brands, the parent company of Victoria's Secret, came under public pressure in 2019 from an activist shareholder of Barington Capital Group, L.P., who took issue with the performance of Razek and urged the company to update its brand image and switch up its predominantly male board of directors.

In August 2019, chief marketing officer Ed Razek resigned following a disastrous Vogue interview in which he made inflammatory statements about transgender models. Also in 2019, executive vice president April Holy stepped down after 16 years. In November 2019, Victoria's Secret announced it would no longer hold the annual fashion show featuring its angels, indicating a major change in marketing strategy.

External video
- How Victoria's Secret revolutionized lingerie — then fell behind CNBC, 2019, 10:54

In January 2020, L Brands chairman and CEO Lex Wexner was in talks to step down. Reports of widespread bullying and harassment at Victoria's Secret surfaced in February 2020. On February 1, 2020, The New York Times published an exposé on "the culture of misogyny" at Victoria's Secret, which painted a picture of long-time influential executive Ed Razek's rampant sexual misconduct.

The company announced a sale in February 2020 to private equity firm Sycamore Partners for $525 million, with L Brands retaining a 45% minority stake. On April 22, 2020, The Wall Street Journal reported that Sycamore Partners wanted out of the deal, which included exceptions for a pandemic. The deal ultimately fell through. Wexner stepped down but maintains a role as chairman emeritus.

In June 2020, a shareholder filed a lawsuit against the company for inaction following reports of harassment, discrimination, and retaliation at Victoria's Secret.

Shareholders of parent company L Brands filed a complaint in the Court of Chancery of Delaware on January 14, 2021, stating that former chair Wexner, among others, created an "entrenched culture of misogyny, bullying and harassment" and was aware of abuses being committed by accused sex trafficker Jeffrey Epstein, which breached his fiduciary duty to the company, causing devaluation of the brand. The complaint also names Wexner's wife, Abigail, current chair, Sarah E. Nash, and former marketing officer, Ed Razek, whose "widely known misconduct" was long allowed at the company.

=== 2021–present ===
Victoria's Secret & Co. logo after split from L Brands

In 2021, after the resignation of Razek as well as the sale of the company by Wexner, Victoria's Secret's new ownership and management implemented policy changes and new partnerships with a number of new spokeswomen, including Megan Rapinoe, Priyanka Chopra Jonas, and Naomi Osaka. Wexner's parent company, L Brands spun Victoria's Secret off to become an independent business under the name Victoria's Secret & Co. (trading on the NYSE as VSXY) on August 3, 2021. Following this brand positioning, Victoria's Secret reported sales increases in all three completed quarters of 2021.

Martin Waters was named CEO in 2021, replacing Stuart Burgdorfer, who had served as interim CEO. In July 2022, Victoria's Secret named Amy Hauk chief executive of both the Victoria's Secret and Pink brands.

In November 2022, it was announced that Victoria's Secret had acquired the New York-headquartered lingerie brand, Adore Me for US$400 million.

In May 2025, Victoria's Secret shut down its website and some store services because of a security incident.

== Products ==
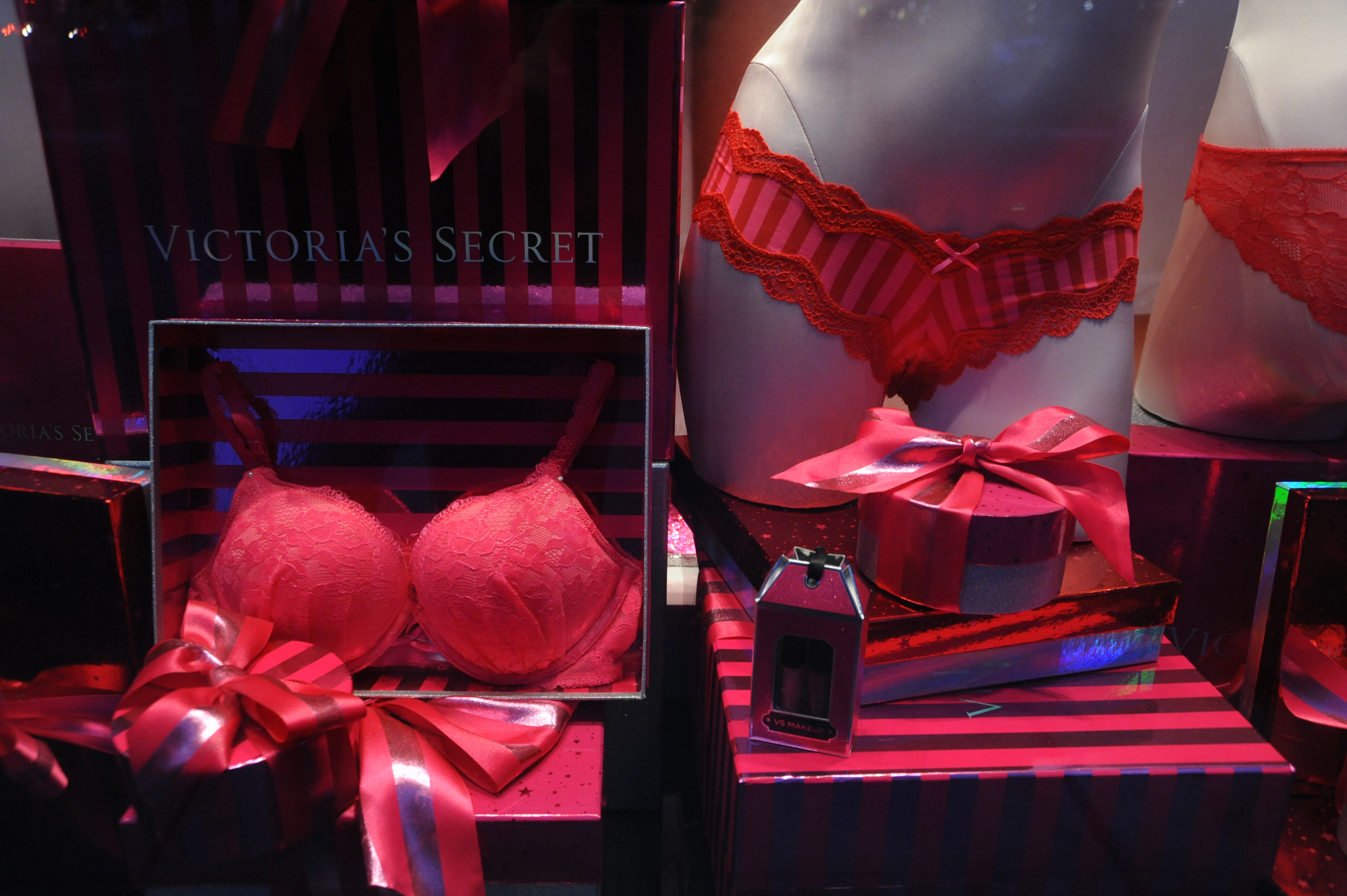
Victoria's Secret lingerie, store display in Seattle in 2008

In addition to the primary brand of lingerie for Victoria's Secret, the company has secondary product lines: namely, activewear known as Victoria sports, swimwear, and a beauty division with fragrances, make-up, accessories, and other bath and body products.

The swimwear, introduced in 2002, was made available until April 2016, when the company announced that the line would end and be replaced by a new line of activewear. The swim line was relaunched in November 2018. In March 2019, the swim line was made available in shops.

In 2010, Victoria's Secret launched the 'Incredible' bra. The company released Victoria's Secret Designer Collection in 2012, described by Vogue as the company's "first high end lingerie line." In 2016, Victoria's Secret confirmed the elimination of swimwear, apparel, shoes, and accessories. In 2017, the company began to put more emphasis on bralettes (bras without underwire, often intended to be worn visibly) and sports bras (under the Victoria Sport label) to appeal to a younger customer base.

In 2019, Victoria's Secret relaunched its product line of eyewear and footwear, in hopes of boosting struggling sales for the brand.

In October 2021, Pink launched a line of reusable period panties.

In 2022, Victoria's Secret & Co. announced they would no longer use cashmere in their product lines.

== Operating divisions ==
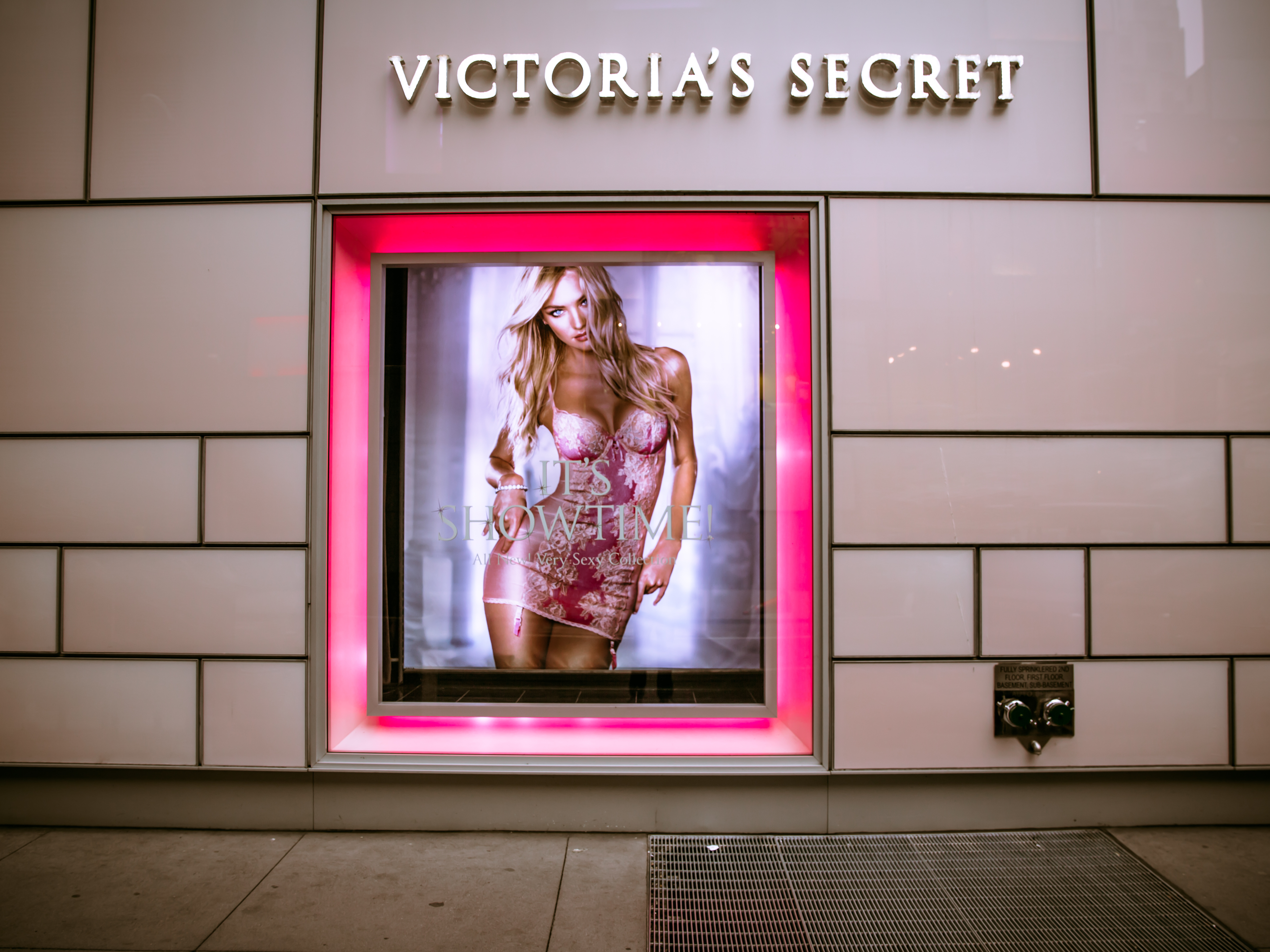
Victoria's Secret store, New York

The Victoria's Secret brand is organized into three divisions: 'Victoria's Secret Stores' (physical locations), 'Victoria's Secret Direct' (online and catalog operations), and 'Victoria's Secret Beauty' (bath and cosmetics). The change was made in 2016 by Wexner to "refocus on core business" and it required each division to have its own CEO.

=== Physical locations ===
The physical store locations were an important part of establishing the brand and remained concentrated in the United States from 1977 until the early 2000s.

Victoria's Secret stores took over the lingerie market during the 1980s by using a fabricated sense of Britain, featuring this romantic styling and soft classical music. In the early years, Wexner himself was involved in carefully orchestrating store interior design through the use of English floral wallpaper circa 1890, gilded fixtures, classical music, soft lighting, the scent of old-fashioned sachet, and elegant perfume bottles that "look like your grandmother's crystal".

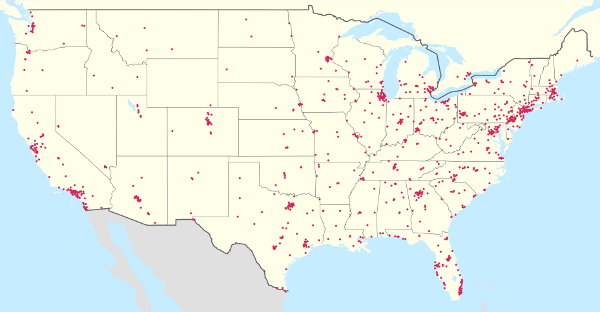
August 2011 map of store locations in the United States

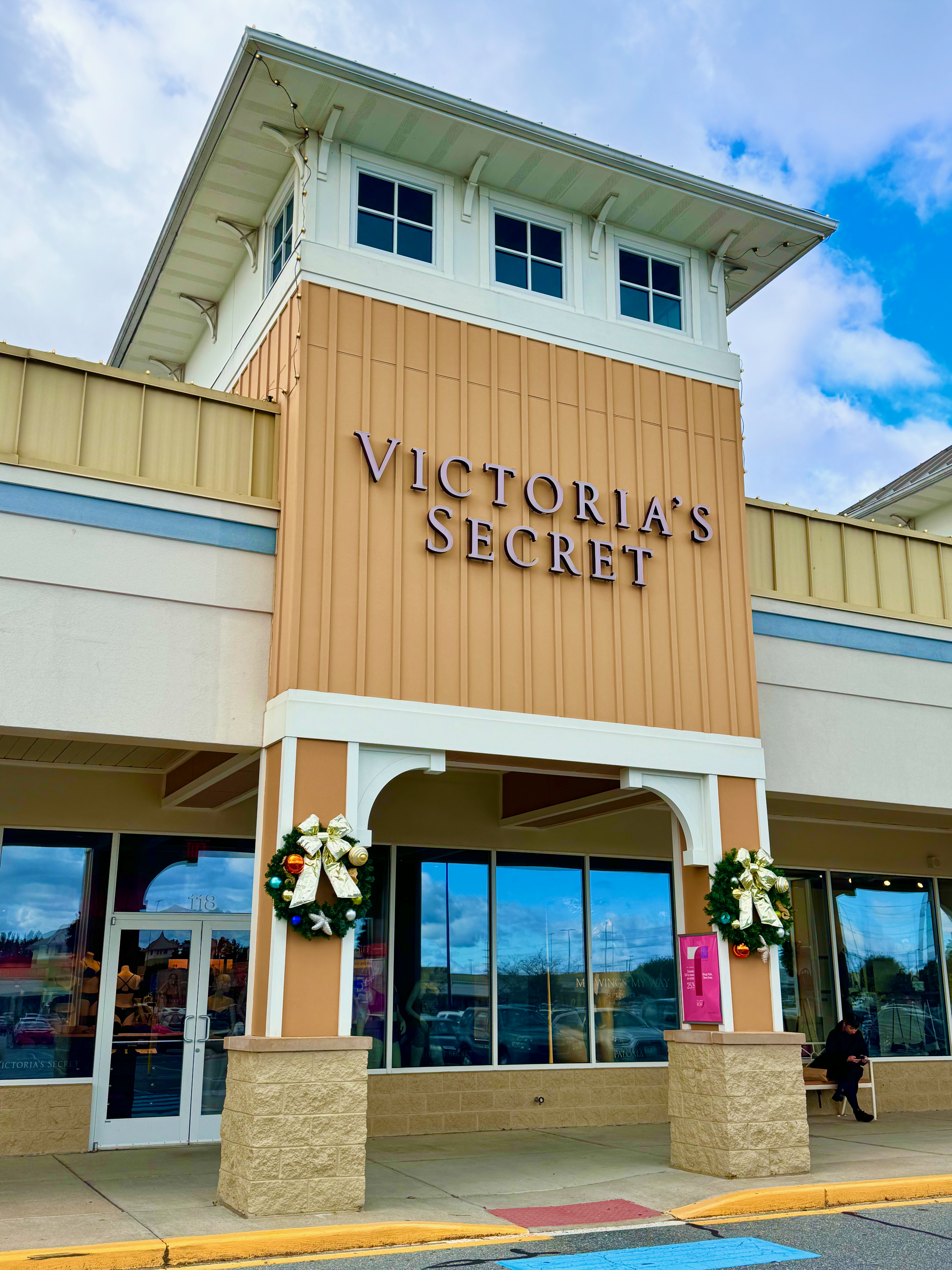
A Victoria's Secret store in Rehoboth Beach, Delaware

During the 1990s, in-store sales at Victoria's Secret increased by 30% after the company tracked and applied data analysis of where specific styles, sizes, and colors were selling. The decade also brought an expansion of store size to triple from 1,400 square feet (130 m^{2}) to an average 4,500 square feet (420 m^{2}). The trend continued into 2002, when the average Victoria's Secret store was 6,000 square feet (560 m^{2}).

In 2000, the Los Angeles Times reported that the company continued the practice of putting on "a British air—or what the Ohio-based chain thinks Americans believe is British. Boudoirish. Tony. Upscale."

By 2010, there were 1,000 Victoria's Secret lingerie stores and 100 independent Victoria's Secret Beauty Stores in the United States, mostly in shopping centers, then offering bras, panties, hosiery, cosmetics, and sleepwear.

==== International stores ====
The international expansion of Victoria's Secret stores began in 2008. As of 2016, L Brands maintained control of operations at company-owned stores in Canada, the UK, and China but relied on franchises elsewhere in the world for its Victoria's Secret Beauty & Accessory (VSBA) locations.

===== Canada =====
The drive for growth, coupled with a maturing American retail market, led to a shift towards expansion, first into Canada. In 2010, the first Canadian store opened in Edmonton, Alberta. In 2012, Victoria's Secret opened stores in Nova Scotia and Quebec. Several of the company's stores in Canada are considered large by retail standards and span more than 10,000 square feet (930 m^{2}) each. As of 2020, the company's Canadian locations included cities in all ten provinces, from British Columbia all the way to the Maritimes. However, the company announced in May 2020 plans to permanently shutter 13 of its 38 Canadian stores, representing a loss of one-third of the Canadian fleet.

===== United Kingdom =====
Victoria's Secret opened a store at the Westfield Shopping Centre, Stratford, London in July 2012. Their flagship 40,386-square-foot- (3,752.0 m^{2}) store on New Bond Street, London followed in August 2012. Locations in the United Kingdom include the cities of Leeds, Manchester, Sheffield, Birmingham, Bristol, Westfield London, Bluewater, Brent Cross and Glasgow. As of June 2020, there were 25 stores in the United Kingdom. That same month, Retail Dive reported that the brand's UK arm went into administration, as it struggled with falling sales, profits, and market share.

===== China =====
In 2016, it was reported that L Brands fully purchased 26 stores back from its franchise partners in China. The company announced plans to expand on the existing 26 Victoria's Secret Beauty & Accessory (VSBA) stores (boutiques which sold beauty products in airports or malls), through the addition of flagship stores in Shanghai and Beijing.

Reuters reported that, as of June 2020, Victoria's Secret had two dozen stores in Greater China. That same month, the company permanently closed its 50,000 square feet (4,600 m^{2}) flagship store in Causeway Bay, Hong Kong after only two years of operation.

On January 25, 2022, Victoria's Secret announced a Joint venture partnership agreement with Regina Miracle International (Holdings) Limited. Under the terms of the agreement, Victoria's Secret will own 51% of the joint venture and Regina Miracle will own 49%. CEO Martin Waters commented, "I am delighted to announce this partnership with Regina Miracle, who has been a valued merchandise supplier partner for more than twenty years. Together with Regina Miracle, we aim to grow the China business through joint investment in product development, distribution, and marketing. We expect the partnership will positively impact the speed and agility of the business to benefit consumers and provide us with a platform for a strong future in this important market."

=== Victoria's Secret Direct ===
==== Catalog (1977–2016) ====
Prior to the emergence of e-commerce, the company's catalogs were a key aspect of successfully marketing a product considered risqué to consumers in the privacy of their own homes. According to Joseph Sugarman, the 1979 catalog was "a lot more sensuous" and took the form of "an upmarket version of a Frederick's of Hollywood lingerie catalog."

The New York Times reported that the success of Victoria's Secret catalogs influenced others to present lingerie as "romantic and sensual but tasteful" with models photographed in elegant settings. The company was known for accepting phone orders at any hour, which helped it establish dominance in the lingerie market. The Los Angeles Times described the catalog in 2000 as having achieved "an almost cult-like following." The company was mailing more than 400 million catalogs annually in 2010.

In May 2016, the brand decided to discontinue the catalog, which had run at a cost of $125 million to $150 million annually, due to concern that catalogs had grown stale as a marketing device and confidence that sales would not be affected.

==== E-commerce ====
Victoria's Secret spent three years building an e-commerce website that was officially launched on December 4, 1998. Following heavy promotion of the 1999 fashion show, the website experienced high traffic volumes, with visitors enduring "slowdowns and bottlenecks" while viewing the first online fashion show on February 3, 1999, the largest online streaming event to date, reaching an estimated 1.5 million viewers. Ad placement in the Wall Street Journal and a 30-minute TV spot during the Super Bowl contributed to drive record numbers of visitors to the website.

=== Victoria's Secret Beauty ===
In 1998, Intimate Brands Inc., the parent company of Victoria's Secret, created a new entity: Intimate Beauty Corporation. The goal for Intimate Beauty Corporation was to manage and develop the bath, fragrance and cosmetic products for Victoria's Secret. By 2006, the Victoria's Secret Beauty division had reported sales of nearly US$1 billion. The company sought to expand its beauty and accessories stores at airports around the world in the early 2010s.

==== Franchise locations worldwide (VSBA) ====
Victoria's Secret Beauty opened a provisional UK boutique at Heathrow Airport in 2005 through partnership with World Duty Free.

In 2010, Victoria's Secret expanded with Victoria's Secret Beauty & Accessory (VSBA) franchises internationally. That year, M.H. Alshaya Co. opened the first Victoria's Secret store in the Marina Mall in Kuwait, selling cosmetics and accessories but not the company's lingerie line. Two VSBA stores were opened in the early 2010s at Schiphol International Airport, Netherlands. That same year, the first Latin American franchise store opened in Isla Margarita, Venezuela, followed by a store in Bogotá, Colombia, in July 2012. An additional store opened in the Multiplaza Mall in San Salvador, El Salvador, in 2012.

A Caribbean location opened in November 2011 at Plaza Las Americas in San Juan, Puerto Rico followed by a store in Santo Domingo, Dominican Republic, at the Agora, and Sambil Santo Domingo malls in 2012. In July 2012, the first Polish store opened at the Złote Tarasy shopping mall in Warsaw, also operated by M.H. Alshaya Co.

A first Serbian store opened in January 2014 at the Nikola Tesla Airport in Belgrade. Another store opened in Usce Shopping Mall in Belgrade in 2025.

As of 2016, L Brands had more than 370 VSBA franchise shops worldwide, with the company's largest international market reportedly in Turkey and the Middle East.

== Corporate affairs ==
=== Ownership and name ===
The company's business name changed from Victoria's Secret, Inc. to Victoria's Secret Stores, Inc., after the 1982 sale to Wexner. In 2005, the name was revised to Victoria's Secret Stores, LLC.

Victoria's Secret was acquired by The Limited in 1982. Victoria's Secret's parent company was Intimate Brands, a separately traded entity with Ed Razek as president. In 2002, Intimate Brands was combined with the Limited, then renamed Limited Brands.

By 2006, the majority of the revenue for Limited Brands came from Victoria's Secret and Bath & Body Works.

In July 2007, Limited Brands sold a 75% interest in Limited Stores and Express to Sun Capital Partners, in order to focus on expanding their Victoria's Secret and Bath & Body Works units. The sale resulted in Limited Brands taking a $42 million after-tax loss.

In 2013, parent company Limited Brands officially changed its name to L Brands.

Victoria's Secret recorded peak worldwide net sales in 2016 of $7.78 billion. In 2019, worldwide net sales had receded to $6.81 billion.

=== Management structure ===
At 'Victoria's Secret Stores', Howard Gross was promoted to president of the division in 1985. Grace Nichols succeeded Gross and led the division from 1991 through 2007. Victoria's Secret Stores was helmed by Lori Greely from 2007 until 2013.

Cynthia Fedus-Fields served as president and CEO and oversaw the Victoria's Secret Direct business, including its catalog, from the mid-1980s until 2000. She was succeeded in May 2000 by Sharen Jester Turney as chief executive of the division. Turney stepped down in 2016 and was succeeded by Jan Singer as CEO of Victoria's Secret Direct from 2016 to 2018. John Mehas was appointed CEO starting in 2019. He was replaced by Martin Waters in November 2020.

Hired by L Brands in 1998, Robin Burns was CEO of Victoria's Secret Beauty until 2004. Burns was succeeded in August 2004 by Jill Granoff, COO, and Sherry Baker, president. In May 2006, Christine Beauchamp was named president and CEO of Victoria's Secret Beauty. Shashi Batra was appointed president of the division in 2009. In November 2012 Susie Coulter became president of Victoria's Secret Beauty. Greg Unis was hired to serve as CEO of the beauty division in 2016.

In 2025, BBRC International, a major Victoria's Secret shareholder led by Brett Blundy, sought board changes and launched a proxy contest against certain directors. At the company's 2026 annual meeting, shareholders reelected all board nominees, including chair Donna James, despite BBRC's campaign.

=== Manufacturing and environmental record ===
In 2006, the Financial Times reported that Victoria's Secret paid factory workers $7 per day to make bras in Thailand. The Huffington Post stated in 2011 that working conditions in factories producing Victoria's Secret items in Jordan were comparable to slave labor as a result of the Jordan–United States Free Trade Agreement, which retreated from standards established in the 1990s. In 2012, Victoria's Secret was manufacturing bras in the South Indian city of Guduvancheri.

In 2021, Victoria's Secret fronted the money to more than 1,250 Thai garment workers who were owed $8.3 million when their factory, Brilliant Alliance, closed after declaring bankruptcy.

After years of pressure from environmentalists, Victoria's Secret and a conservation group reached an agreement to make the catalog more environmentally friendly in 2006. Catalog wood pulp was required to contain 10 percent recycled paper and avoid source forests with woodland caribou habitats in Canada, unless certified by the Forest Stewardship Council. The company bought organic and fair trade-grown cotton to make some of its panties in 2012.

== Marketing ==
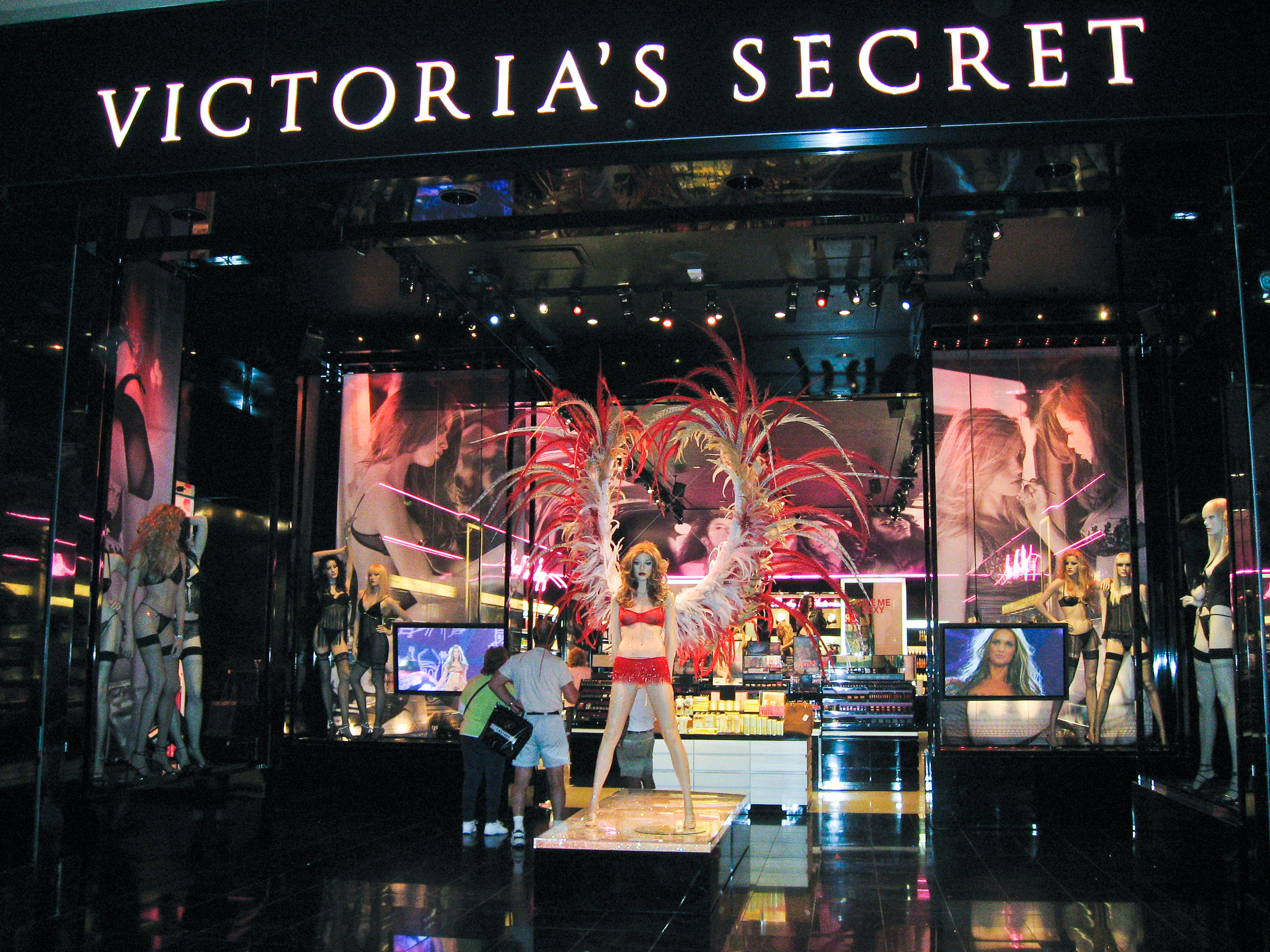
Victoria's Secret visual merchandising with Angel wing display. Las Vegas, Nevada store, 2006

Since the company's founding, the mail order catalog has been its main method of marketing. Early catalogs featured lingerie-clad models holding violins and glasses of sherry. Catalog marketing shifted towards female models accompanied by men for several years in the 1980s, a practice that was eventually abandoned by 1991.

In the early 1980s, Victoria's Secret used FCB/Leber Katz Partners for the development of their brand, marketing, and advertising. In 1989, FCB/Leber Katz Partners and Victoria's Secret executed a national advertising campaign with a ten-page glossy insert in the November issue of Elle, Vogue, Vanity Fair, Victoria, House Beautiful, Bon Appétit, New Woman, and People magazines. Victoria's Secret used the insert to announce their expansion into the toiletries and fragrance business. The catalog, sporadic ads in fashion magazines, and word of mouth had all contributed to the company's growth before the insert.

Ed Razek joined in-house branding operations at the Limited in the 1980s and increasingly began to shape the marketing and branding at Victoria's Secret. However, Razek credited Wexner as the creative force behind much of the marketing. The company gained notoriety in the early 1990s after it began to hire supermodels for its advertising and fashion shows. Well-known models hired in the early 1990s included Stephanie Seymour, Karen Mulder, Yasmeen Ghauri, and Jill Goodacre. The models helped the brand gain an audience and were soon featured in televised commercials.

From 1995 to 2018, L Brands used the Victoria's Secret Fashion Show as a significant marketing tool. The show was a mix of "beautiful models scantily clad in lingerie" and A-list entertainers that, over time, became "less about fashion and more about show". The 2000 fashion show in France was produced with the help of Harvey Weinstein.

In 1999, a 30-second Super Bowl advertisement resulted in one million visits to the company's website within an hour of airing.

Victoria's Secret sued a strip-mall store in Elizabethtown, Kentucky called Victor's Little Secret over the issue of trademark dilution. On March 4, 2003, the US Supreme Court ruled against Victoria's Secret in Moseley v. V Secret Catalogue, Inc. on the grounds that there was insufficient proof of actual harm to the trademark.

In 2004, Victoria's Secret presented an uncharacteristic advertisement with Bob Dylan as an alternative means of promoting the brand. Razek, then chief creative officer, credited Wexner himself with the idea to cast Dylan in a commercial. The ad proved to be memorable, but more out of a tendency to unsettle and baffle viewers familiar with Dylan.

Victoria's Secret TV commercials, directed by Michael Bay, were released in 2010 and 2012 with mixed results, regarded by critics as macho and misguided.

In 2014, the company created a campaign to market its Body bra line called The Perfect Body, that elicited substantial controversy for supporting only a limited and unhealthy body type.

Victoria's Secret announced the appointment of Raul Martinez as head creative director in December 2020. Martinez, formerly of Condé Nast, took on the role following the departure of chief executive John Mehas, who stepped down in November 2020.

=== Victoria's Secret Fashion Show ===
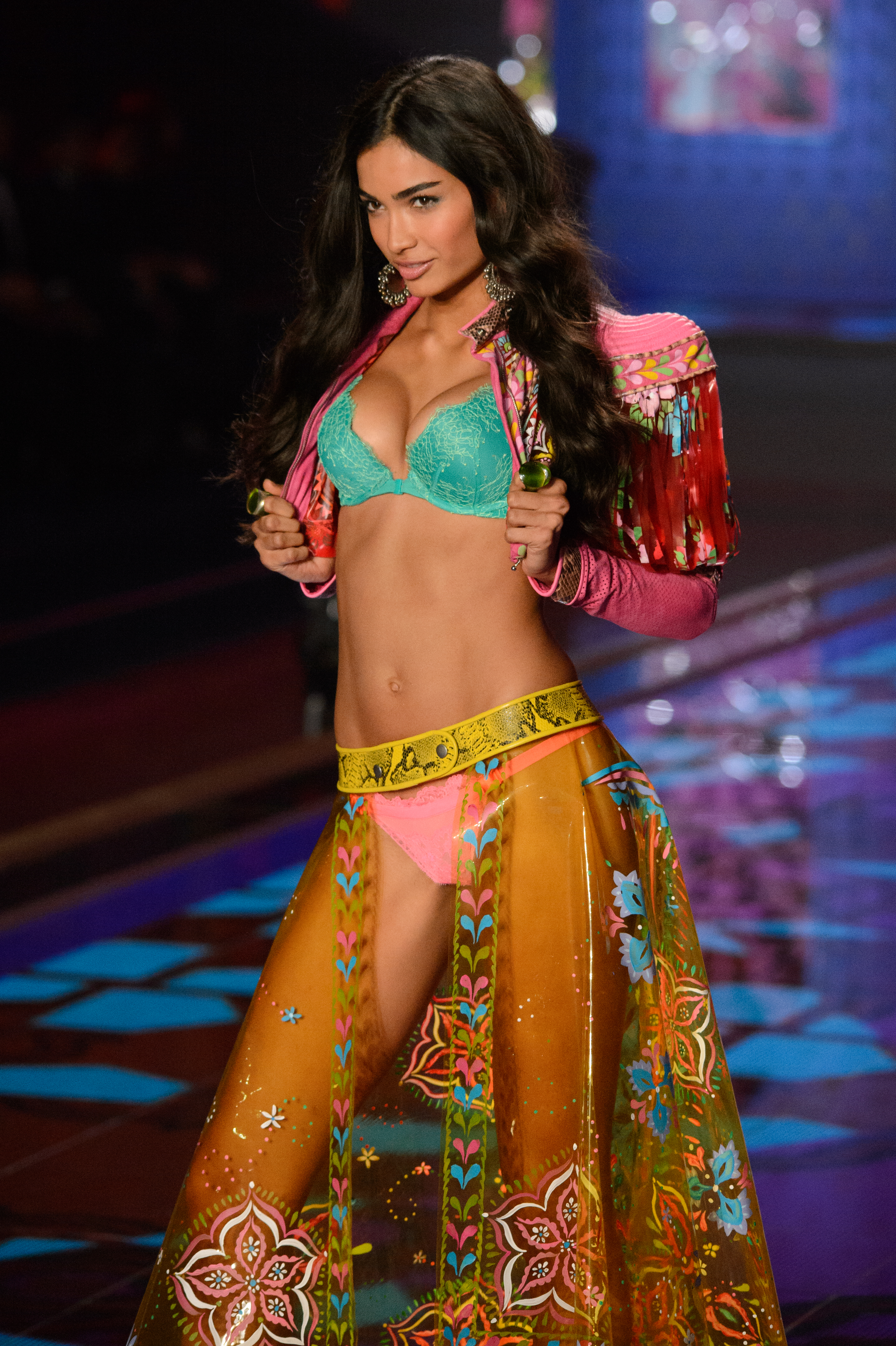
Kelly Gale at the Victoria's Secret Fashion Show, 2014

The first Victoria's Secret Fashion Show was held in 1995 and was broadcast on primetime American television. The fashion show, overseen by Ed Razek, was described by Newsweek as "a combination of self-assured strutting for women and voyeuristic pleasures for men" that made lingerie mainstream entertainment.

Ken Weil, vice president at Victoria's Secret, and Tim Plzak, responsible for IT at Victoria's Secret's parent company, Intimate Brands, led Victoria's Secret's first-ever online streaming of their fashion show in 1999. The 18-minute webcast streamed February 2, 1999, was at the time the Internet's "biggest event" since inception. The 1999 webcast was reported as a failure by a number of newspapers on account of some users' inability to watch the show featuring Tyra Banks, Heidi Klum, and Stephanie Seymour as a result of Victoria's Secret's technology falling short being able to meet the online user demand resulting in network congestion and users who could see the webcast receiving jerky frames. In all, the company's website saw over 1.5 million visits, a number significantly higher than the 250,000 and 500,000 simultaneous viewers that Broadcast.com, the website hosting the show, was able to handle. In total, 1.5 million viewers either attempted or viewed the webcast.

The 1999 webcast served to create a database for Victoria's Secret of over 500,000 current and potential customers by requiring users to submit their contact details to view the webcast. The next spring, Victoria's Secret avoided technical issues by partnering with Broadcast.com, America Online, and Microsoft.

By 2011, the budget for the fashion show was $12 million, up from the first show's budget of $120,000. In November 2019, Victoria's Secret canceled its runway show. In July 2021, the company said there are plans to relaunch the show, but without the Victoria's Secret Angels.

In May 2024, PageSix reported that Victoria's Secret intends to bring back the fashion show after a five year-hiatus.

=== Victoria's Secret Angels ===
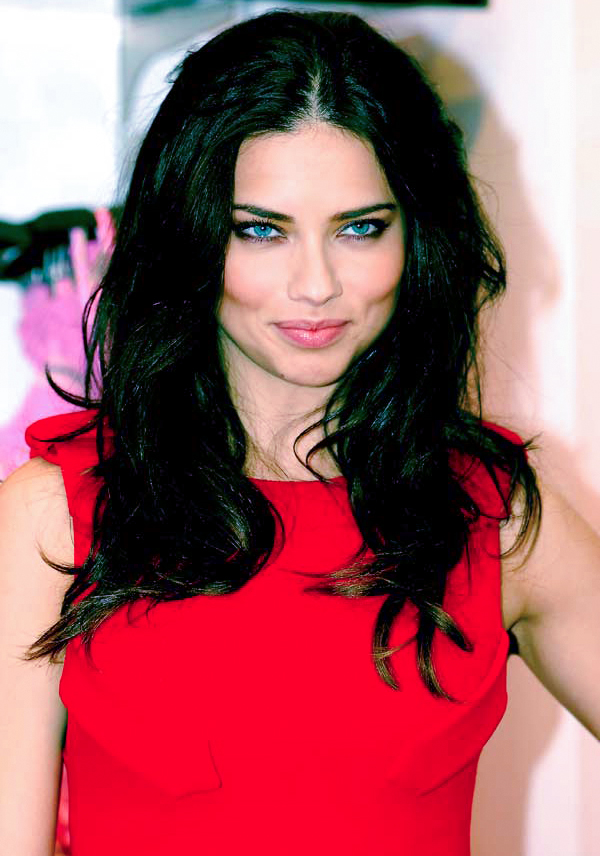
Adriana Lima, the longest-running Victoria's Secret Angel from 2000 to 2018

The company's Angels underwear collection was marketed in 1997 by a television commercial that included supermodels Helena Christensen, Karen Mulder, Daniela Peštová, Stephanie Seymour, and Tyra Banks. In the commercial, the Angels appear in a white cloudscape in dialog with "God", played by Welsh singer Tom Jones, widely known for his fans' tradition of tossing their panties at him during shows. The spoof proved popular and the Angels, as characters, became a regular feature of the advertising as brand ambassadors. The term "Angel" soon became synonymous with the brand.

Official Angels have greater responsibilities than other runway models for the brand, as the Angels are obliged to appear in marketing campaigns, talk shows, major runway shows, and the annual fashion show. The Angels are contracted spokesmodels for the brand, but the company is not transparent about the terms of these contracts. In 1998, the Angels made their runway debut at Victoria's Secret's 4th annual fashion show (Chandra North filled in for Christensen). The brand's Fashion Show and the Angels were closely connected through 2018, the final year that event was held. Some of the early Victoria's Secret Angels included Inés Rivero and Laetitia Casta.

In 2004, the company did not hold a fashion show due to fallout from the Super Bowl XXXVIII halftime show controversy, and instead alternately marketed the brand via a tour called Angels Across America. Victoria's Secret sent its five contract models (Banks, Klum, Bündchen, Lima, and Ambrosio) out for the event.

Victoria's Secret's Angels continued to be featured in popular culture and were chosen to be part of People magazine's annual "100 Most Beautiful People in the World" in 2007. The Angels became the first trademark awarded a star on the Hollywood Walk of Fame on November 13, 2007, with Klum, Lima, Ambrosio, Kurkova, Goulart, Ebanks, Marisa Miller, and Miranda Kerr at hand. Alongside new Angel Doutzen Kroes, they also took part in the grand reopening of the Fontainebleau in Miami in 2008.

In 2009, the brand held a nationwide competition for a new Runway Angel. Thousands of contestants applied; Kylie Bisutti prevailed as the winner but soon grew disillusioned and parted ways with the brand. Ellingson, Kroes, and Kloss departed after the 2014 fashion show.

Several promotional tours featuring the Angels have been organized by the brand. These included the 2010 Bombshell tour, the 2012 VSX tour, and the 2013 Swim tour. In 2015, Angels featured on the brand's first Swim Special were Elsa Hosk, Martha Hunt, Jac Jagaciak, Stella Maxwell, Lais Ribeiro, and Jasmine Tookes, along with model Joan Smalls.

In 2019, the Victoria's Secret Fashion Show was canceled. Despite this, the existing Angels kept their contracts, and four new angels Leomie Anderson, Grace Elizabeth, Alexina Graham, and Barbara Palvin, were added to the roster earlier that year.

By 2020, Victoria's Secret has had at least 3 dozen official Angels (Note: There have been various instances where the fashion show credits included models who were not Angels but were prominently featured by the brand, such as Candice Swanepoel, Lindsay Ellingson, Rosie Huntington-Whiteley, Erin Heatherton, and Behati Prinsloo in 2009, Lais Ribeiro in 2011, PINK model Elsa Hosk in 2013 and Hosk, Ribeiro, Jasmine Tookes, Martha Hunt, and Stella Maxwell in 2014. All of them later went on to become Angels.) Other notable spokesmodels for the brand have included Claudia Schiffer, Eva Herzigová, Oluchi Onweagba, Jessica Stam, Ana Beatriz Barros, and Bregje Heinen, as well as celebrity Taylor Momsen.

In 2021, the Angels were discontinued in favor of a new concept known as the "VS Collective", which features a more diverse array of models and influencers as spokespeople, such as photographer Amanda de Cadenet, Adut Akech, actress and Miss World 2000 Priyanka Chopra, Paloma Elsesser, soccer player Megan Rapinoe, and Valentina Sampaio—the first openly transgender model to be featured on the Sports Illustrated Swimsuit Issue.

In 2024, the Victoria's Secret Fashion Show returned. Although many former Angels participated, no models held the Angel contract. The following year, the show kept a similar format. However, shortly after the show, in an Interview Magazine article, executive creative director Adam Selman revealed that the brand had brought back contracted models, referred to as "contract girls" rather than traditional Angels—for campaigns, store appearances, and related work. These contract girls included former Victoria's Secret Angels Adriana Lima, Candice Swanepoel; WNBA Basketball Player Angel Reese; as well as models Paloma Elsesser, Devyn Garcia, Abby Champion and Anok Yai.

In 2026, Victoria's Secret held a reality competition docuseries to select a new Angel. The show, Angels Among Us, premiered on September 27 on Youtube. 10 individuals were selected from live casting event and competed to become the next Angel, making her debut at the Victoria's Secret Fashion Show 2026.

Nationality	Name	Contract (Note: Most Angels started working with the company years prior to signing an Angel contract. Listed above are the dates of first published or aired campaigns or, by default, first runway show or event.)	First hiring	Runway shows
United States	Stephanie Seymour	1997–2000	1992	1995–2000
Denmark	Helena Christensen	1997–1998	1996	1996–1997
Netherlands	Karen Mulder	1996–2000	1992	1996–2000
Czech Republic	Daniela Peštová	1997–2003	1996	1998–2001
United States	Tyra Banks	1997–2005	1996	1996–2003; 2005 2024
United States	Chandra North	1998 (Note: Contracted as a replacement Angel for Helena Christensen during the Victoria's Secret Fashion Show 1998 and released immediately afterwards)	1998	1997-1998
Argentina	Inés Rivero	1998–1999	1998	1998–2001
France	Laetitia Casta	1998–2000	1997	1997–2000
Germany	Heidi Klum	1999–2010	1997	1997–2003; 2005; 2007–2009; (host only in 2006)
Brazil	Gisele Bündchen	2000–2007	1999	1999–2003; 2005–2006
Brazil	Adriana Lima	2000–2018	1999	1999–2003; 2005–2008; 2010–2018; 2024
Brazil	Alessandra Ambrosio	2004–2017	2000	2000–2003; 2005–2017; 2024
Czech Republic	Karolína Kurková	2005–2008	2000	2000–2008; 2010
Cayman Islands	Selita Ebanks	2005–2009	2004	2005–2010
Brazil	Izabel Goulart	2005–2008	2004	2005–2016
United States	Marisa Miller	2007–2010	2002	2007–2009
Australia	Miranda Kerr	2007–2013	2005	2006–2009; 2011–2012
Netherlands	Doutzen Kroes	2008–2014	2004	2005–2006; 2008–2009; 2011–2014; 2024
Namibia	Behati Prinsloo	2009–2019	2007	2007–2015; 2018; 2024
United Kingdom	Rosie Huntington-Whiteley	2010–2011	2005	2006–2010
South Africa	Candice Swanepoel	2010–2018	2007	2007–2015; 2017–2018; 2024
United States	Chanel Iman	2010–2012	2008	2009–2011
United States	Erin Heatherton	2010–2013	2008	2008–2013
United States	Lily Aldridge	2010–2018	2008	2009–2017
United States	Lindsay Ellingson	2011–2014	2006	2007–2014
United States	Karlie Kloss	2013–2015	2011	2011–2014; 2017
Russia	Kate Grigorieva	2015–2016	2014	2014–2016
United States	Taylor Hill	2015–2021	2014	2014–2018 2024
Sweden	Elsa Hosk	2015–2020	2011	2011–2018
United States	Martha Hunt	2015–2020	2012	2013–2018
Poland	Jac Jagaciak	2015–2016	2013	2013–2015
New Zealand	Stella Maxwell	2015–2021	2014	2014–2018
Brazil	Lais Ribeiro	2015–2021	2010	2010–2011; 2013–2018
Portugal	Sara Sampaio	2015–2021	2012	2013–2018
Netherlands	Romee Strijd	2015–2021	2014	2014–2018
United States	Jasmine Tookes	2015–2021	2012	2012–2018 2024
Denmark	Josephine Skriver	2016–2021	2013	2013–2018 2024
Hungary	Barbara Palvin	2019–2021	2011	2012 2018 2024
United Kingdom	Alexina Graham	2019–2021	2017	2017–2018
United Kingdom	Leomie Anderson	2019–2021	2015	2015–2018
United States	Grace Elizabeth	2019–2021	2016	2016–2018 2024

==== Pink spokesmodels ====
Nationality	Name	Contract
Brazil	Alessandra Ambrosio	2004–2005
Australia	Miranda Kerr	2006–2007
Namibia	Behati Prinsloo	2008–2011
Sweden	Elsa Hosk	2011–2014
United States	Rachel Hilbert	2015–2016
United States	Zuri Tibby	2016–2019
United States	Grace Elizabeth	2016–2019

== Criticisms and controversies ==
=== Harassment and abuse ===
In 2019, nonprofit advocacy group Model Alliance and several other publications reported on initiatives underway in California, New York and the United States aiming to protect models from harassment and sexual abuse.

==== Silencing of harassment complaints ====
After Razek left Victoria's Secret in 2019, Monica Mitro, a high-ranking executive at the company reported she had been repeatedly verbally abused by Razek during his time there. Mitro was executive vice president of public relations for the brand and was heavily involved in the production of its annual fashion show, having been one of the public faces of the brand. The day after Mitro made her allegations, she showed up to work to find she had been locked out of the building and placed on administrative leave. Though the brand claimed this decision was made prior to Mitro lodging her complaint, many believed this was a retaliatory action by the company and in late 2019 Mitro indicated she was pursuing legal action against her dismissal. It was reported in 2020 that she had settled with the brand for an undisclosed sum.

==== Connections with Jeffrey Epstein ====
Les Wexner, who acquired Victoria's Secret in 1982, as part of his retail empire, reportedly had direct ties with Jeffrey Epstein, an American sex offender and a pedophile, whom he met sometime around 1986. Wexner was also alleged to have given Epstein power of attorney, and that Epstein lived for a time at his "Wexner Xanadu", which is a property of Les Wexner located in Ohio. Wexner also reportedly gave Epstein money, an Upper East Side townhouse (which later sold for $51 million), and a Boeing 727 owned by L Brands. Epstein would represent himself as a recruiter for Victoria's Secret when approaching girls and young women. In 2006 Epstein's lawyer Alan Dershowitz used the Victoria's Secret personnel file of one of Epstein's accusers in an attempt to discredit her.

==== Alleged links to Uyghur forced labour ====
In 2020, the Australian Strategic Policy Institute (ASPI) included Victoria's Secret among dozens of international brands whose supply chains were linked to factories allegedly involved in state-sponsored Uyghur forced labour transfer programs in China. According to ASPI's report Uyghurs for Sale, Uyghur workers were transferred from Xinjiang to factories across China under conditions that "strongly suggest forced labour".

==== Racism and corporate apologies ====
The company has faced a number of major complaints of racism, profiling, and discrimination by both managers and employees, with several recurring issues being raised by former employees, the federal government, state governments, and customers in the United States. Each time, Victoria's Secret management or a corporate spokesperson has issued an apology and disavowed the discriminatory actions of any individual employee. Victoria's Secret has changed some employment practices, and settled some of the cases, including a $12 million settlement in California and New York reached in 2017, and a $179,300 settlement with the United States Equal Employment Opportunity Commission.

=== Influence on socio-cultural body image norms ===
In the 2008 academic research article "Victoria's Dirty Secret: How Sociocultural Norms Influence Adolescent Girls and Women", authors from Wilfrid Laurier University and the University of Waterloo stated: "Women's body dissatisfaction is influenced by socio-cultural norms for ideal appearance that are pervasive in society and particularly directed at women", cautioning that the marketing practices of Victoria's Secret, delivered through TV commercials, ads, and magazines send a message to girls and women that their models are a realistic standard of beauty, concluding that "Exposure to societal messages that reflect the socio-cultural norm for ideal appearance has a negative effect on women."

The song Victoria's Secret by American singer-songwriter Jax, released 30 June 2022, calls out Victoria's Secret and its former CEO, billionaire Leslie Wexner for profiting off women's insecurities and contributing to their negative body image, singing "I know Victoria's secret/And girl, you wouldn't believe/She's an old man who lives in Ohio/Making money off of girls like me/Cashing in on body issues/Selling skin and bones with big boobs". The song has been praised by celebrities such as Jamie Otis, Rosie O'Donnell and Howie Mandel. On 11 August 2022, Amy Hauk, CEO of Victoria's Secret, posted a statement to the company's Instagram account, claiming that the song resonated with her and that the company had "no excuses for the past" and that she was "committed to building a community where everyone feels seen and respected". Upon seeing the post, Jax posted a video to TikTok replying that her intention was never to "take down a brand".

=== Use of cultural stereotypes ===
During the 2010 Victoria's Secret Fashion Show, the segment 'Wild Things' caused controversy due to the "tribal style" outfits on display. The most notable of these was worn by Afro-Brazilian model Emanuela De Paula who, alongside a group of dancers, was painted with black lines, meant to depict tribal body art. This outfit received backlash from the media, not only for appropriating African culture but for the racist connotations associated with dressing a woman of color in animal print lingerie and body art and branding her a 'Wild Thing'. No apology was released by the brand.

In 2012, the company drew criticism for a lingerie collection offer for sale on their website that was titled 'Go East', with a tagline that pledged to women the capacity to "indulge in touches of eastern delight with lingerie inspired by the exquisite beauty of secret Japanese gardens." The collection included a 'Sexy Little Geisha' outfit that was pulled by the company after critics described the items as "stereotypical images that use racist transgression to create an exotic edge." The Wall Street Journal confirmed that the geisha outfit was "accessorized with a miniature fan and a kimono-esque obi sash" and the Asian-themed collection "that traded in sexualized, generic pan-Asian ethnic stereotypes" was removed by the company.

At the 2012 Victoria's Secret Fashion Show, an outfit in the 'Calendar Girls' segment caused controversy. The outfit, worn by Karlie Kloss, was meant to represent November and the American holiday of Thanksgiving, but featured a Native American headdress alongside an animal print bikini. This caused outrage among members of the Native American community, who stated that the headdress depicted had deep cultural significance and was only worn by certain notable war chiefs and warriors. After media backlash over the offensiveness of the outfit and the uncomfortable position that the brand put Kloss in, the outfit was cut from the show's final broadcast. Kloss apologized for the incident via Twitter and the brand later made a statement of apology.

At the 2016 Victoria's Secret Fashion Show, the brand was accused of cultural appropriation during the segment entitled 'The Road Ahead' which drew inspiration from both Chinese and Mexican culture. Kendall Jenner's flame tail wings, Elsa Hosk's dragon costume, and Adriana Lima's embroidered thigh-high boots caused an uproar, as some media and fans believed it was inappropriate for women of other descents to wear items important to Chinese culture. Victoria's Secret claimed it included this segment in the 2016 show because of their recent expansion into the Chinese market, and believed a segment featuring Chinese garments, as well as Liu Wen and Ming Xi, two popular Chinese models, would be a good way to appeal to their new Chinese customer base. No apology or statement was released from the brand.

In the 2017 Victoria's Secret Fashion Show, the brand faced further controversy and allegations of cultural appropriation. The criticism was directed at fashions in the 'Nomadic Adventures' segment that appropriated Native American and Indigenous African cultures. Nylon magazine suggested that the company had learned nothing from previous, similar incidents.

=== Transgender models ===
In a November 2018 interview with Vogue, Victoria's Secret president Ed Razek stated (when discussing diversity in the Victoria's Secret Fashion Show): "Shouldn't you have transsexuals in the show? No. No, I don't think we should. Well, why not? Because the show is a fantasy. It's a 42-minute entertainment special. That's what it is." These comments received immediate backlash from transgender model Carmen Carrera as well as Victoria Secret models Kendall Jenner, then Angel Lily Aldridge, and former Angel Karlie Kloss.

Razek later issued an apology, stating "My remark regarding the inclusion of transgender models in the Victoria's Secret Fashion Show came across as insensitive. I apologize. To be clear, we would absolutely cast a transgender model for the show."

In August 2019, the brand cast its first openly transgender Brazilian model Valentina Sampaio, who was hired to work for PINK. That same month, Razek stepped down. In 2022, the brand hired Emira D'Spain as their first Black transgender model. In 2023, the brand hired Alex Consani to be a part of the Victoria Secret rebrand in the 2023 fashion show.

== See also ==
- List of Victoria's Secret models
- Victoria's Secret Swim Special
