= Ellery (given name) =

Ellery is a given name, and may refer to:

== People ==
=== As a first name ===
- Ellery Eskelin, a jazz musician
- Ellery Sprayberry, an American actress
- Ellery Hollingsworth, an American professional snowboarder
- Ellery Schempp (born Ellory Schempp), a physicist
- Ellery Queen, pseudonym of authors Frederic Dannay and Manfred Lee
  - Ellery Queen, fictional detective created by Dannay and Lee
- Ellery Hanley, a rugby league player and coach

=== As a second name ===
- William Ellery Channing, a Unitarian theologian
- William Ellery Channing (poet), a Transcendental poet
- George Ellery Hale, an American solar astronomer

== See also ==
- Eleri (disambiguation), the Welsh form of Hilarus
