= Laguna Atascosa National Wildlife Refuge =

National Wildlife Refuge near Harlingen, Texas

- IUCN category IV (habitat/species management area)
- Location within Texas
- Location: Cameron / Willacy counties, Texas, United States
- Nearest city: Harlingen, Texas
- Coordinates: 26°17′01″N 97°23′06″W
- Area: 120,000 acres (490 km^{2})
- Established: March 29, 1946
- Visitors: +200,000 (in 2003)
- Governing body: United States Fish and Wildlife Service
- Website: Laguna Atascosa National Wildlife Refuge

Laguna Atascosa National Wildlife Refuge is the largest protected area of natural habitat left in the Lower Rio Grande Valley.

The 120,000-acre (49,000 ha) refuge is located almost entirely in Cameron County, Texas, 25 mi (40 km) east of Harlingen, although a very small part of its northernmost point extends into southern Willacy County.

== History ==
The Laguna Atascosa National Wildlife Refuge was created following World War II in 1946 to protect habitat for migratory birds and waterfowl, specifically redhead ducks (Aythya americana).

By 2010, it had grown to encompass a total of 65,096 acres (26,343 ha) in a landscape of "an interspersed pattern of meandering resacas (oxbow lakes), lomas (brush-covered sand/clay dunes), coastal prairies, and wetlands".

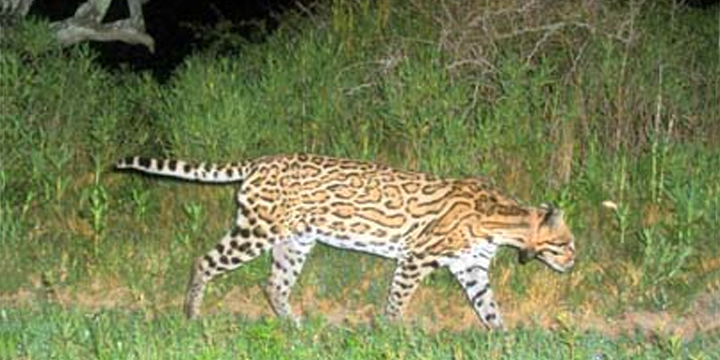
Ocelot (Leopardus pardalis) with tracking collar, Laguna Atascosa National Wildlife Refuge

In January 2024, the Texas Parks and Wildlife Department announced a proposal to add 477 acres (1.93 km^{2}) to the Laguna Atascosa National Wildlife Refuge via a swap of land currently owned by SpaceX, to allow SpaceX to become the owner of 43 acres (17 ha) of Boca Chica State Park land to expand their existing rocket-launch facility at SpaceX Starbase.

== Fauna ==
The Peregrine Fund began reintroducing captive-bred northern aplomado falcons (Falco femoralis septentrionalis) to the refuge in 1985, which had been nearly extirpated from the Southwestern United States; by 2009, it was home to 26 pairs.

Nine other endangered or threatened species inhabit the refuge, such as the Texas ocelot (Leopardus pardalis albescens) and (formerly) the Gulf Coast jaguarundi (Herpailurus yagouaroundi), rare wild cats.

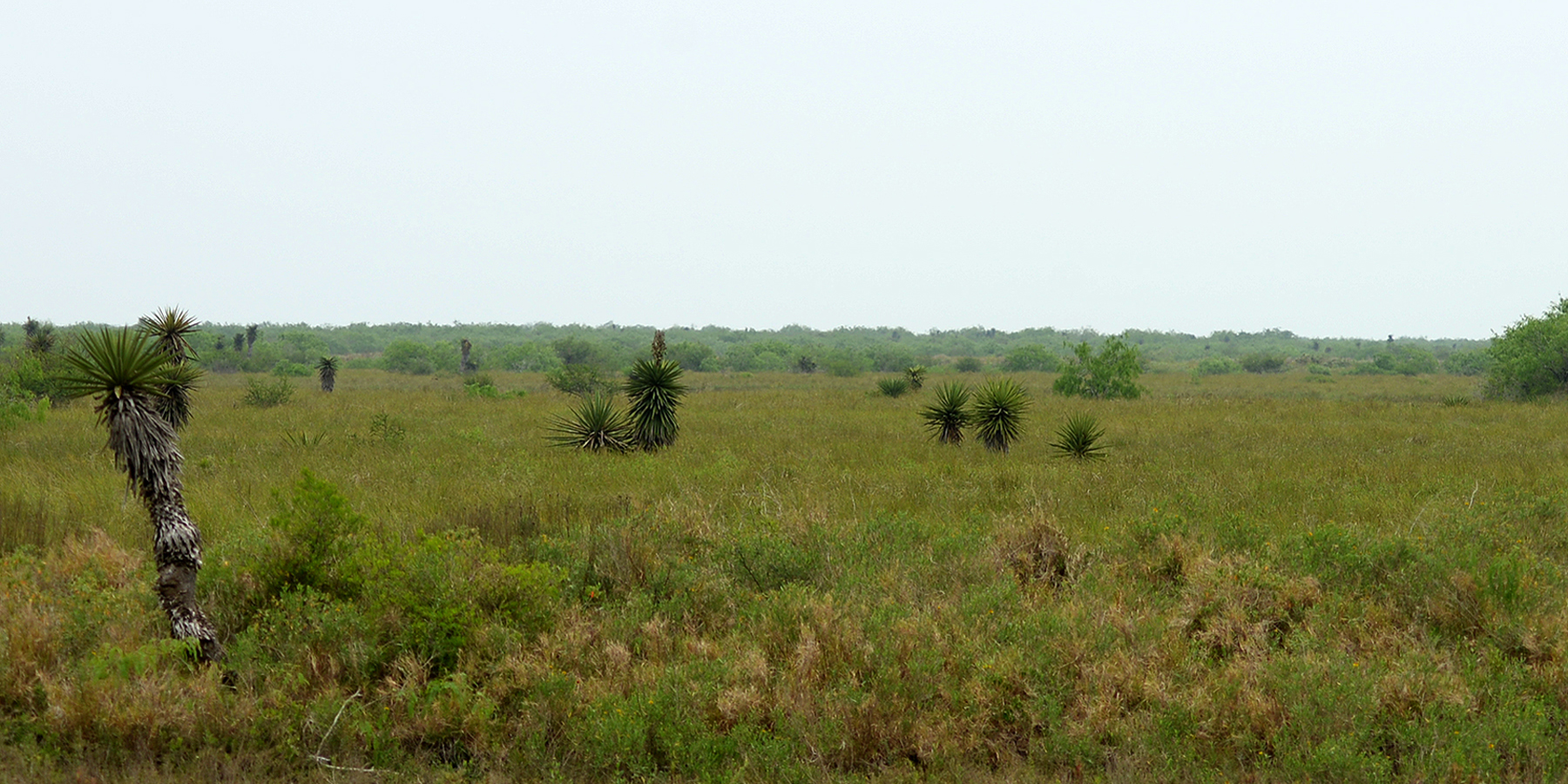
Spanish dagger (Yucca treculeana) at Laguna Atascosa National Wildlife Refuge (April 12, 2016)

== Botany and ecology ==
Programs at the refuge include vegetation and wetland restoration.

== See also ==
- Hilary Swarts, ocelot biologist at Laguna Atascosa
