= Elar =

Elar or ELAR or Ellar may refer to:

== Places ==
- Elar, now Abovyan, a town in Armenia
- Ellar, the former name of Lorasar, an abandoned village in Armenia

== Other uses ==
- Endangered Languages Archive (ELAR)
- Ellar Coltrane (born 1994), an American actor

== See also ==
- Elar Char Adhyay, a 2012 Bengali film
- Ilar (disambiguation)
- Elah (disambiguation)
