= Sharen Jester Turney =

American businesswoman

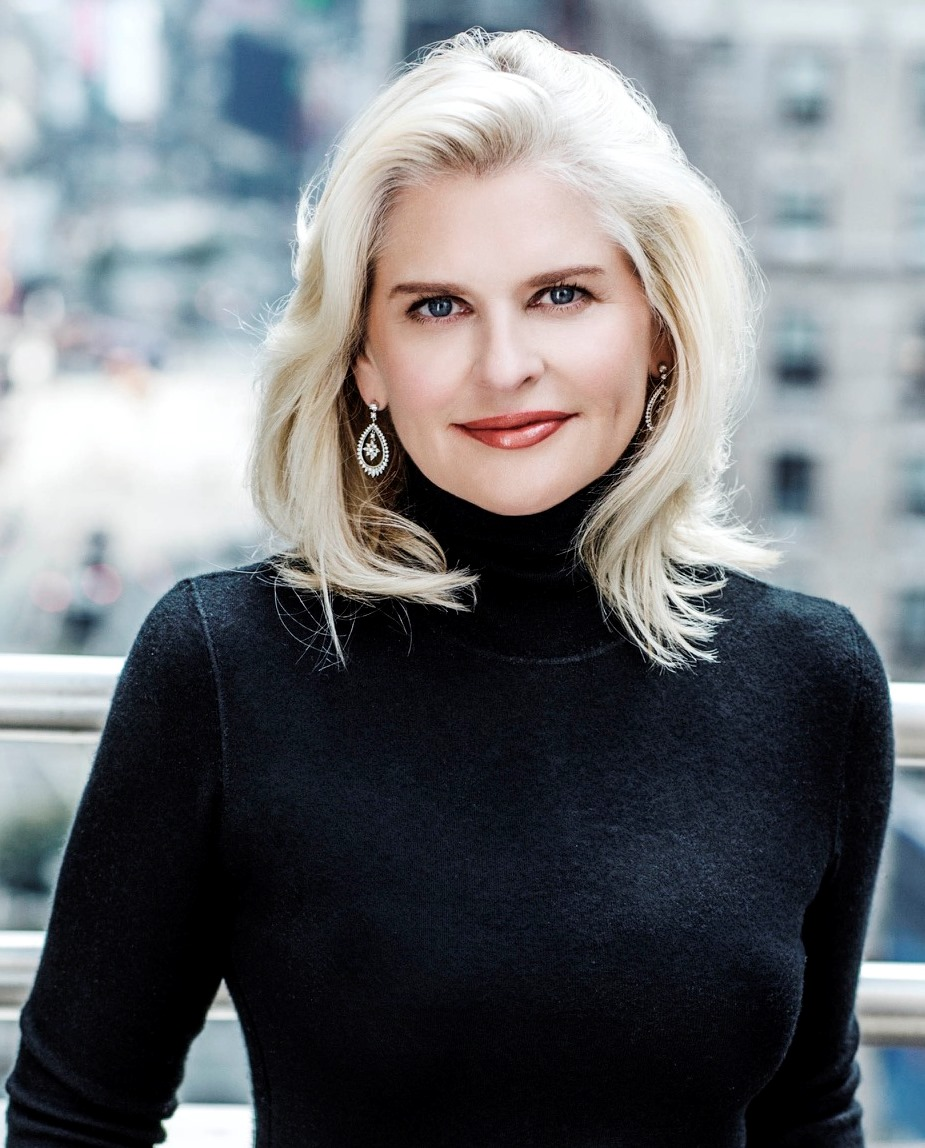
- Born: Sharen Jester; Ardmore, Oklahoma, U.S.
- Education: University of Oklahoma
- Occupation: Global Business Leader
- Years active: 1979–present
- Spouse: Charles Turney (m. 1989)
- Children: 1
- Website: sharenjesterturney.com

Sharen Jester Turney (née Jester) is an American businesswoman, and former president and CEO of Victoria's Secret (before 2019), a $7.7 billion company which she led for a decade, doubling profit and increasing sales by 70%, Victoria's Secret is the largest retailer of intimate apparel, and the largest subsidiary of L Brands Inc (formerly Limited Brands Inc). In 2013, Bloomberg named Jester Turney the fourth highest compensated female executive in the United States. In February 2016, she stepped down as CEO after a decade and the previous six years as president and CEO of Victoria's Secret Direct.

== Career ==
Turney attended the University of Oklahoma, and earned a bachelor's degree in business education with a minor in public relations. Upon graduation in 1979, she began her career as a buyer for Foley's, a department store chain in Houston, Texas.

Following stints at Byer California and Federated Department Stores, Turney joined Neiman Marcus, where she became executive vice president of merchandising and then senior vice president and general merchandise manager. She finished her career at Neiman Marcus as president and CEO of NM Direct, the company's e-commerce and catalog division, Horchow Catalog and Chefs Catalog. In 2000, she became the CEO of Victoria's Secret Direct, the e-commerce and catalog division of the successful women's apparel and lingerie brand, Victoria's Secret.

In July 2006, Turney was promoted to president and CEO of Victoria's Secret. As CEO, she has overseen an increase in total sales revenue from $4.5 billion to over $7.7 billion and more than doubled the profit in 2015. Victoria's Secret is currently the largest subsidiary of L Brands Inc at 40% of total revenue. She resigned as CEO of Victoria's Secret in February 2016.

Turney is on the board of trustees for the University of Oklahoma Foundation and the board of directors for Bread Financial and Academy Sports + Outdoors in North America and NewStore in the US and Europe. She serves on the Jay H. Baker Retailing Initiative advisory board at The Wharton School, University of Pennsylvania. Turney served as chairman of the board of directors for the Turney served as chairman of the board of directors for the Research Institute at Nationwide Children's Hospital, was on the board of directors for both Nationwide Children's Hospital and The James Cancer Hospital, and was an eight-year board of directors member for M/I Homes, Inc.

In December 2018, Turney becomes interim CEO of private apparel company, Gloria Jeans.

== Awards and recognition ==
In 2018, Turney received the University of Oklahoma's Celebration of Education Award of Distinction, the college's highest honor, presented to alumni.

In 2016, Turney was honored at the Way to Win Gala in New York for her support of the organizations work to assist homeless women and children on their journey toward independence. The event is Way to Win's largest annual fundraiser.

In 2015, Turney was inducted into the state of Oklahoma Hall of Fame.

In March 2014 Glassdoor included Turney in "America's Favorite Bosses" CEO ranking list (one of only two women). In March 2013, Turney was the only female CEO in the Top 50 of Glassdoor's "America's Favorite Bosses" list. In 2011, Turney ranked in the Top 10 of the Glassdoor's ten most popular retail CEOs.

In 2005, Turney received the Dr. Catherine White Achievement Award from HeartShare Human Services in New York City. In 2009, she received the H.U.G. Award from the Intimate Apparel Square Club (IASC) in honor of her participation in raising funds for pediatric charities. In 2013, she was inducted into the Hall of Fame for the business education department at the University of Oklahoma, her alma mater. During her time at the university, she was a member of the Delta Gamma fraternity.

In 2004, Turney accepted the Femmy Award from The Underfashion Club

In 1997 and while at Neiman Marcus, Turney received the distinguished Fashion Medal of Honor.

== Personal life and philanthropy ==
Turney was born in 1956 in Ardmore, Oklahoma, and grew up on a farm to a cattle rancher father and teacher and nutritionist mother. She has been married since 1989 to her husband Charles and they have a son, Matthew, born in 1994.

Turney is on the board of trustees for the University of Oklahoma Foundation, the board of directors for Nationwide Children's Hospital. She is chairman of the Research Institute for Nationwide Children's Hospital. Turney is part of the Industry Advisory Committee for the Jay H. Baker Retailing Center at the Wharton School of the University of Pennsylvania.

Turney has given to The James at The Ohio State University Comprehensive Cancer Center. her alma mater University of Oklahoma, and Nationwide Children's Hospital.
