= Ilar =

Ilar (the Welsh, and Croatian, form of the masculine given name Hilary) may refer to:

- Saint Ilar, a 6th-century Welsh saint
- Hilary of Poitiers (4th century), bishop of Poitiers in France, in Welsh sources
- Saint Hilarion (4th century), an Egyptian monk, in Croatian sources
- Ilar (hundred), a hundred of Cardiganshire named for Llanilar
  - Llanilar ("St Ilar's")
- International League of Associations of Rheumatology (ILAR)
- Institute for Laboratory Animal Research

== See also ==
- Hilary (name)
- Eleri (disambiguation), another Welsh form of this name
- Elar (disambiguation)
