= Hillery =

Hillery may refer to:

== People ==
- Brian Hillery (1937–2021), Irish businessman and politician
- Fred A. Hillery (1854–1937), American Methodist
- Jarrick Hillery (born 1976) American football player
- Maeve Hillery, Irish doctor
- Patrick Hillery (1923–2008), Irish politician and President of Ireland
- Hillery Johnson, veteran record producer and record label founder

== Places ==
- Hillery, Illinois, U.S.

== See also ==
- Hilary (disambiguation)
