= Saint Hilary =

Saint Hilary may refer to:

== People ==
- Hilary of Poitiers (c. 310–c. 367), Bishop of Poitiers and a Doctor of the Church
- Hilary of Arles (c. 403–449), Bishop of Arles
- Hilary of Galeata (476–558)
- Pope Hilary (died 468), also referred to as Pope Hilarius.

== Other uses ==
- St Hilary, Cornwall, England, a village and civil parish
  - St Hilary's Church, St Hilary (Cornwall), a Grade I listed Anglican church
- St Hilary, Vale of Glamorgan, Wales, a village
  - Church of St Hilary, St Hilary (Vale of Glamorgan), a Grade II* listed Anglican church
- Saint Hilary School (disambiguation)

== See also ==
- Old Saint Hilary's Church, Marin County, California, United States
