= Hilarius =

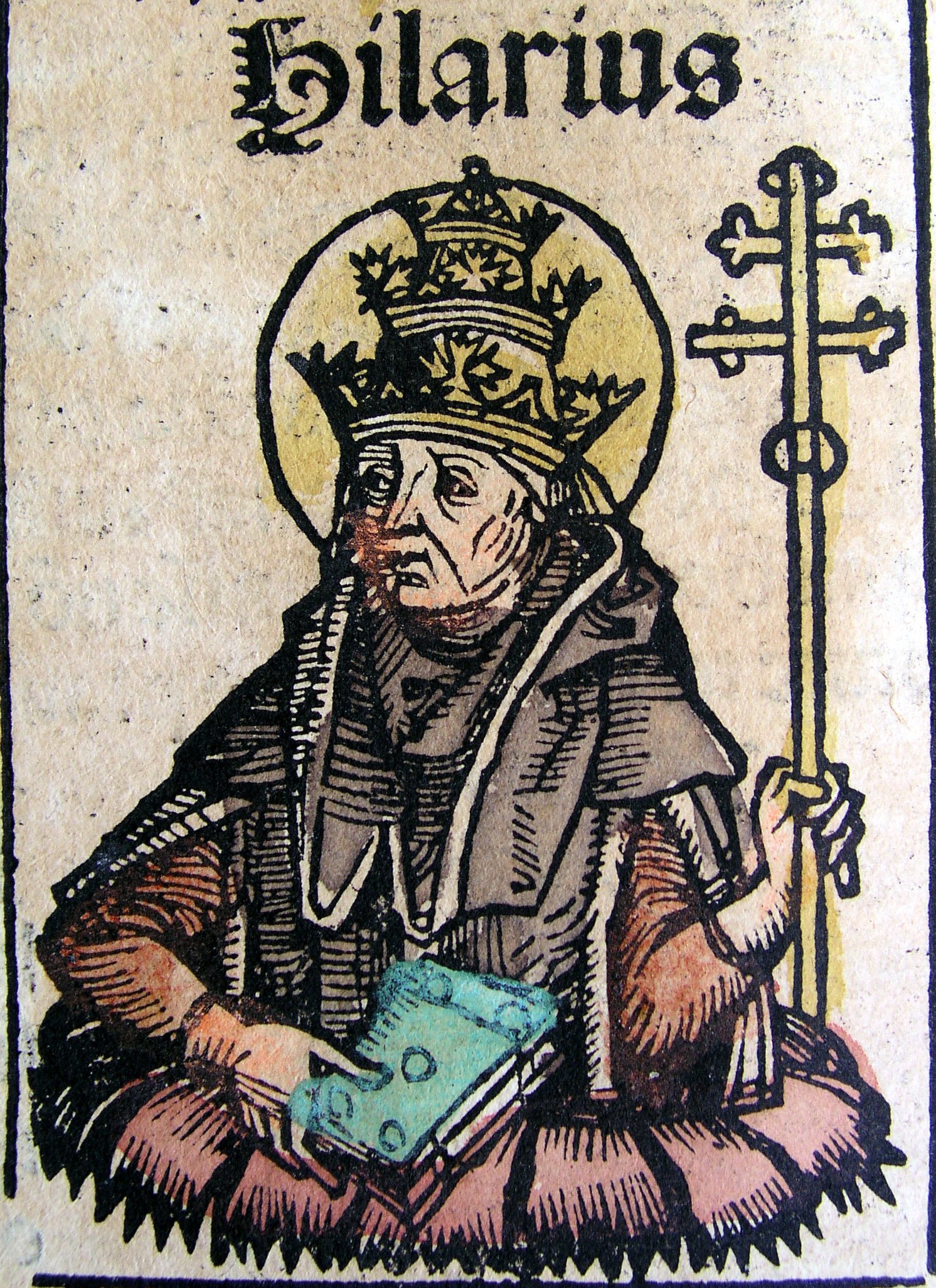
Pope Hilarius, Illustration from the Nuremberg Chronicle by Hartmann Schedel (1440-1514)

Hilarius is the given name of:

- Hilarius of Aquileia (died c. 284), saint, bishop of Aquileia, Italy
- Hilarius or Hilary of Poitiers (c. 310 – c. 367), Bishop of Poitiers and Doctor of the Church
- Hilary the Deacon (Latin: Hilarius Diaconus) (fl. 355), Sardinian deacon of the Roman church
- Hilarius, Archbishop of Tarragona (Spain) c. 402
- Hilarius or Hilary of Arles (c. 403–449), Bishop of Arles and saint
- Hilarius (praefectus urbi), praefectus urbi (prefect of Rome) in 408
- Pope Hilarius or Hilary (died 468), Catholic pope and saint
- Hilarius (poet) (fl. 1125)
- Hilarius Breitinger (1907–1994), German Franciscan prelate
- Hilarius Gilges (1909–1933), Afro-German actor and communist
- Hilarius Moa Nurak (1943–2016), Roman Catholic bishop
- Hilarius of Sexten (secular name Christian Gatterer) (1839–1900), Austrian Capuchin theologian

== See also ==
- Hilary (name)
