= Larion =

Larion is a given name, a simplified form of Illarion. Notable people with the name include:

- Larion Ivanov (died 1682), Russian statesman and diplomat
- Larion Serghei (1952 – 2019), Romanian sprint canoeist

== See also ==
- 3940 Larion, minor planet; not related to the given name
