= Ilario Carposio =

Austro-Hungarian photographer

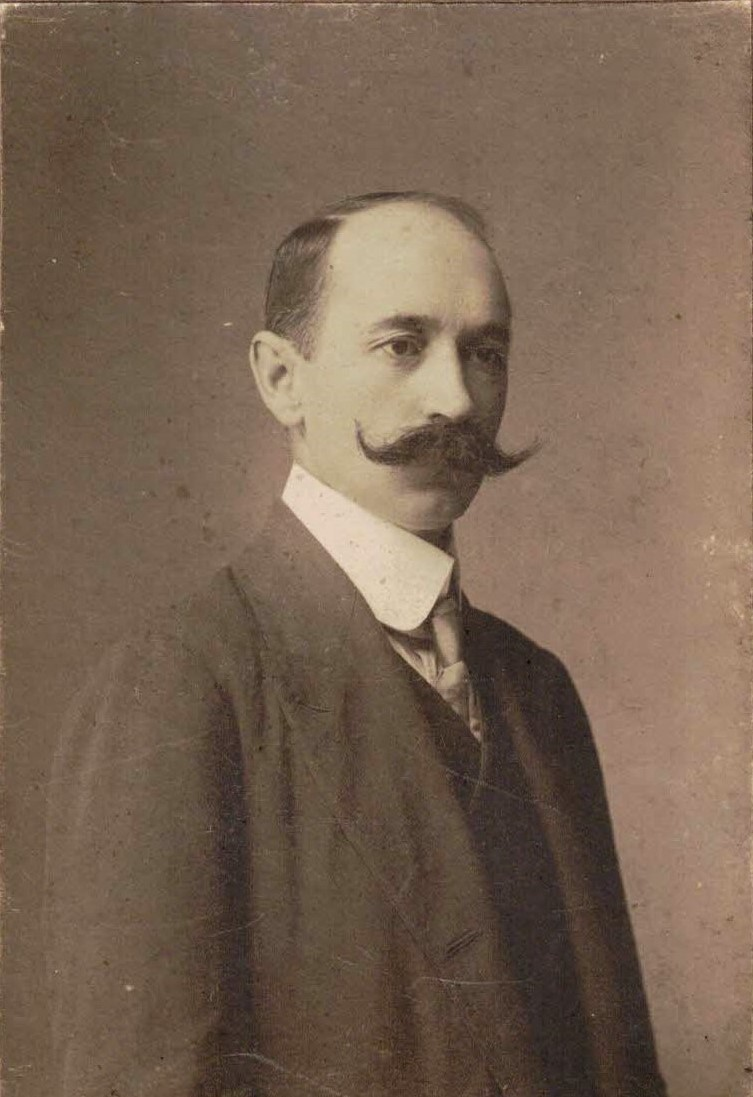
Ilario Carposio in September, 1912

Ilario Carposio (Trento 1852 – Fiume 1921) was an artistic photographer who owned an important studio in Fiume, now Rijeka in present-day Croatia. He was an Italian-speaking citizen of the Austro-Hungarian Empire. The studio opened in 1878 and rapidly became renamed and appreciated. Ilario Carposio received several official awards, among them the first prize in the Austro-Hungarian agro-industrial exposition (Trieste, 1882).

After Ilario's death, the studio continued to work, thanks to Ilario's son Renato Carposio (1886–1930) and later Renato's wife Maruzza. The activity ceased only in 1947, after the Second World War and the important political changes (Fiume/Rijeka was assigned to Yugoslavia and most of the Italian population left).

Ilario Carposio had seven sons, among them Enrico Carposio (1887–1980), who was an outstanding professor of Mathematics and Physics in Fiume and, after World War II, in Bologna.

In April–May 2004, two expositions held in Rijeka and Zagreb renewed the interest of the public in the work of Ilario Carposio.
