= Hillary Super =

American business executive

Hillary Super is an American business executive. She is the chief executive officer of Victoria's Secret and previously was the CEO of Savage X Fenty. She was the global chief executive officer of Anthropologie from 2019 to 2021.

== Career ==
Super earned a B.A. in humanities from the University of Southern California. In the late 1990s, Super joined Wet Seal as a buyer. She later worked for American Eagle Outfitters, Ann Inc., New York & Company, Guess, Gap Inc., and Old Navy.

In April 2019, Super succeeded Andrew Carnie as the global chief executive officer of Anthropologie. In April 2021, she was succeeded by Tricia Smith. In June 2023, she became a board member and chief executive officer of Savage X Fenty, replacing founder Rihanna. On August 14, 2024, she was named the new CEO of Victoria's Secret.

== Personal life ==
In 2017, Super resided in Philadelphia. As of 2023, Super resides in Palm Springs, California. Her wife is Michele Sizemore.
