= HMS Hilary =

HMS Hilary may refer to one of the following Royal Navy ships, both of which were Booth Steamship Company passenger liners requisitioned by the Royal Navy:

- HMS Hilary (1914), a converted to an armed merchant cruiser during World War I and sunk by the German submarine U-88 on 25 May 1917.
- HMS Hilary (1940), requisitioned during World War II for use as a boarding vessel. Returned to merchant service only to be recommissioned again as an infantry landing ship/headquarters ship and used in the Sicily and Normandy landings.
