= Hilary Swarts =

American wildlife biologist

- Born: Paris
- Education: Pomona College, University of California, Davis
- Occupation: Wildlife biologist
- Employer(s): United States Fish and Wildlife Service

Hilary Swarts is a wildlife biologist who works for the United States Fish and Wildlife Service at the Laguna Atascosa National Wildlife Refuge in southern Texas, where she is known for her work with ocelots.

== Early life and education ==
Swarts was born in Paris; her family moved to Connecticut when she was a toddler. She did her undergraduate studies at Pomona College. Her plan going into college was to work with animals; at Pomona, professors James J. McKenna and Rachel N. Levin showed her alternative tracks for this than zookeeping and veterinary science. She graduated in 1994, majoring in biological anthropology, a self-designed plan of study combining the fields of her two mentors.

Before her work with ocelots in Texas, she also studied "bay wrens in Panama, howler monkeys in Belize, monkeys in Suriname, island foxes in California and mountain gorillas in Rwanda". In one incident during this period, a silverback gorilla sat on her head for ten minutes. Returning to graduate study, she completed a Ph.D. in ecology, specializing in conservation biology, at the University of California, Davis.

== Work with the Fish and Wildlife Service ==
After completing her doctorate, Swarts took a desk job with the Fish and Wildlife Service. She transferred to her current position at Laguna Atascosa in October 2013.

Although ocelots can be found in 22 countries, their available habitat has been reduced by development. The south of Texas, where Swarts works, and the south of Arizona are the only parts of the United States where ocelots live and breed in the wild, both in parklands and on private property. However, as Swarts has documented, many have died from automobile collisions. Swarts has worked with the Texas Department of Transportation in the establishment of underpasses beneath the roadways, so that ocelots and other wildlife can cross in safety. Her work with the ocelots also involves tracking them with GPS collars, and trapping them to give them their collars. In 2016, she was involved in the discovery of a den of ocelot kittens, the first such den to be found in the US in 20 years.
