= Ilarion =

Ilarion (Bulgarian: Иларион, Serbian: Иларион, Macedonian: Иларион, Russian: Иларион, Ukrainian: Іларіон, Belarusian: Іларыён) is a variant of the Greek given name Hilarion, found in Orthodox Slavic and Romanian languages. It may refer to:

- Hilarion of Kiev or Ilarion (11th century), Metropolitan of Kiev
- Ilarion Buiuc (1891–1918), Bessarabian politician
- Ilarion Roganović (1828–1882), Bishop of Cetinje and Metropolitan of Montenegro and the Highlands
- Ilarion Ciobanu (1931–2008), Romanian actor
- Ilarion Felea (1903–1961), Romanian Orthodox priest and theologian
- Ilarion Ionescu-Galați (born 1937), Romanian violinist and orchestra conductor
- Hilarion of Makariopolis or Ilarion (1812–1875), Bulgarian cleric
- Ilarion Ruvarac (1832–1905), Serbian historian and Orthodox priest
- Ilarion Ohienko, Metropolitan Ilarion (1882–1972), Ukrainian Orthodox cleric, linguist, and historian
- Ilarion Dragostinov (1852–1876), Bulgarian revolutionary
- Ilarion Hrabovych (1856–1903), Ukrainian poet
- Ilarion Radonić (1871–1932), Bishop of the Serbian Orthodox Church

== See also ==
- Illarion (name)
- Hilario (name)
- Hilarion (name)
- Hilary (name)
- Ilarion Ridge, Antarctica
