= Elery's tube-nosed bat =

Mekong Bat

Conservation status
- Least Concern (IUCN 3.1)

Scientific classification
- Kingdom: Animalia
- Phylum: Chordata
- Class: Mammalia
- Order: Chiroptera
- Family: Vespertilionidae
- Genus: Murina
- Species: M. eleryi

Binomial name
- Murina eleryi Furey, Thong, Bates & Csorba, 2009
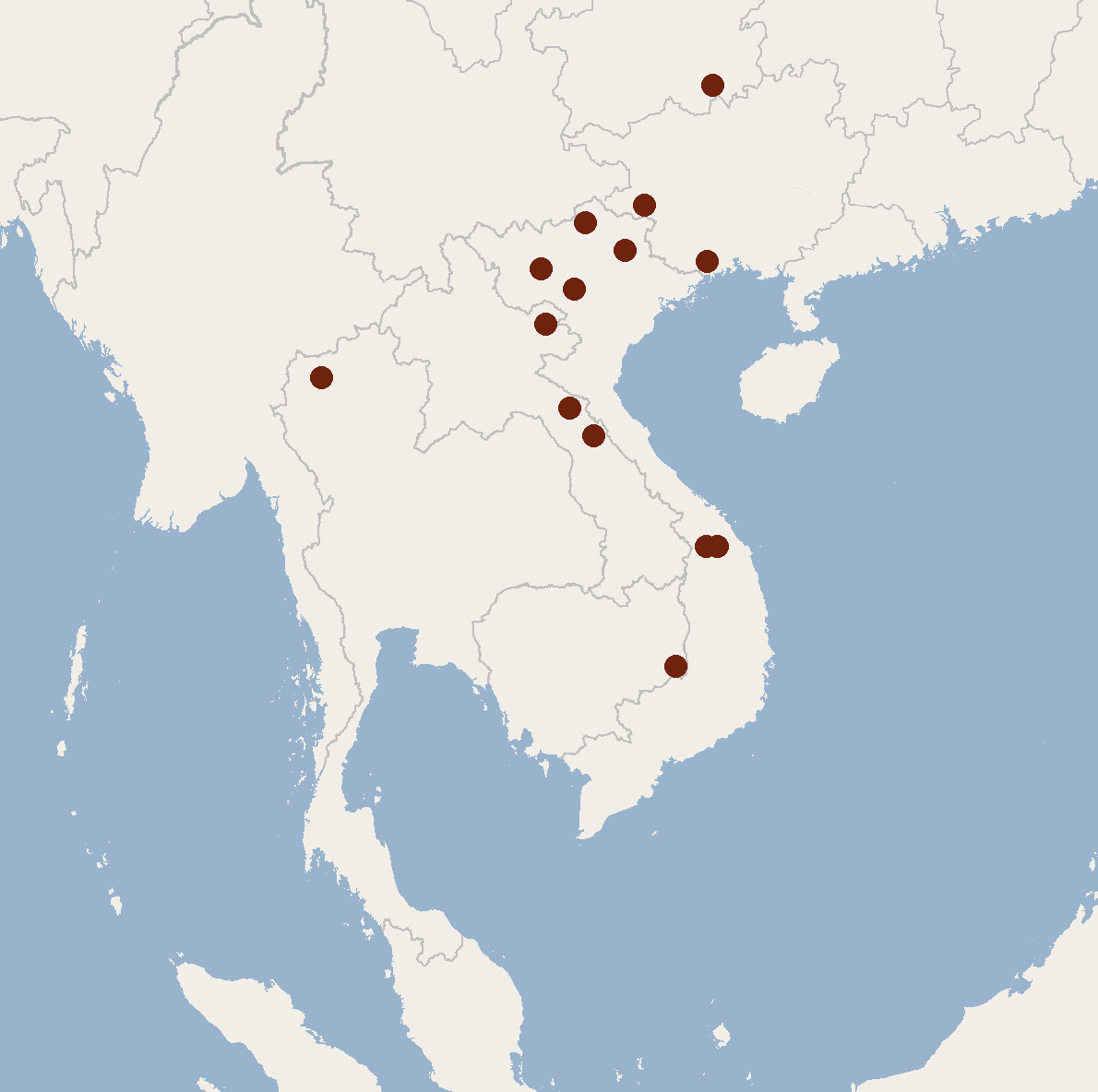

Species of bat

Elery's tube-nosed bat (Murina eleryi), also known as the Mekong bat, is a species of common bats first discovered in a forest of northern Vietnam.
