= Ilario Lanna =

Italian footballer

Personal information
- Date of birth: May 20, 1990 (age 36)
- Place of birth: Rome, Italy
- Height: 1.79 m (5 ft 10 1/2 in)
- Position: Center-back

Team information
- Current team: Mosta FC

Senior career*
Years	Team	Apps	(Gls)
2008–2009	Sambenedettese	7	(1)
2009–2012	Botev Plovdiv	26	(4)
2013–2016	Mosta FC	24	(5)
- * Club domestic league appearances and goals as of August 10, 2017

Ilario Lanna (born 20 May 1990 in Rome) is an Italian footballer who plays as a defender for the Maltese side Mosta FC.

== Career ==
Born in Rome, Ilario Lanna played in 2008–09 season for S.S. Sambenedettese Calcio in Lega Pro Prima Divisione. On 2 September 2009, Bulgarian side Botev Plovdiv signed Lanna, He was given the number 90 shirt.
