= Hilary the Deacon =

Mid-4th century Sardinian deacon

Hilary the Deacon (Latin: Hilarius Diaconus; fl. mid-4th century) was a Sardinian deacon of the Roman church. In 355, along with Lucifer of Cagliari, Eusebius of Vercelli, and Pancratius, he was directed by Pope Liberius to plead for Athanasian orthodoxy before Constantius II at the Council of Milan. He pleaded his case so boldly and offensively that the emperor had him beaten and, along with his companions, condemned to exile. Little is known of him afterwards, except (from Jerome) that he adopted Lucifer's position that Arians, other heretics, and those who dealt with them required a second baptism before they could return to communion.

He is sometimes credited (on doubtful authority) with two works. The first, his Commentary on Paul's Epistles (Commentarius in Epistolas Pauli), is often published along with the writings of St Ambrosius; the other, Questions of the Old and New Testament (Quaestiones Veteris et Novi Testamenti), among the works of St Augustine.

== See also ==
- Other Hilaries
