= Ilario Tranquillo =

Ilario Tranquillo (born Pizzo Calabro, Italy) was the author of a book on ancient Napizia, now Pizzo.

== Biography ==
He descended from the ancient patrician Tranquillo family of Roccangitola, who governed the nearby town of Rocca Angitola.
