= Hilario =

Hilario or Hilário can be both a given name and surname. Notable people with the name include:

== Given name ==
- Hilario (footballer, born 1905) (Juan Hilario Marrero Pérez, 1905–1989), Spanish footballer and manager
- Hilário (footballer, born 1939) (Hilário Rosário da Conceição), Portuguese footballer and manager
- Hilário (footballer, born 1975) (Henrique Hilário Meireles Alves Sampaio), Portuguese footballer
- Hilario Barrero (born 1948), Spanish writer
- Hilario Candela (1934–2022), Cuban-born American architect
- Hilario Davide Jr. (born 1935), Filipino ambassador
- Hilário Maximiniano Antunes Gurjão (1820–1869), Brazilian general
- Hilário Leal (born 1974), Portuguese footballer
- Hilario López (1907–1965), Mexican footballer
- Hilario Zapata (born 1958), Panamanian boxer

== Surname ==
- Jhong Hilario (born 1976), Filipino actor and dancer
- Nenê (born 1982 as Maybyner Rodney Hilário), Brazilian basketball player

== See also ==
- Hilario, cognomen, the third name of an ancient Roman
- Hilarios Karl-Heinz Ungerer (born 1941), German bishop
- Hilario (album), the Inbreds debut album
- Hilarion (name)
- Hilary (name)
