= Ellery Queen (disambiguation) =

Ellery Queen is a pseudonym for authors Frederic Dannay and Manfred Bennington Lee and the name of the fictional character that they created.

Ellery Queen may also refer to:

- The Adventures of Ellery Queen, two television series broadcast in the 1950s
- The Adventures of Ellery Queen (radio program), broadcast from 1939 to 1948
- Ellery Queen (TV series), broadcast 1975–1976
- Ellery Queen's Mystery Magazine, a monthly magazine specializing in crime fiction, continuously in print since 1941
