= Hilary Jones =

Hilary Jones may refer to:

- Hilary Jones (doctor) (born 1953), British general practitioner and media doctor
- Hilary P. Jones (1863–1938), United States Navy officer
- Hilary Bevan Jones (born 1952), British television producer

== See also ==
- USS Hilary P. Jones (DD-427), Benson-class destroyer in the United States Navy during World War II
