= Saint Hilary School =

Saint Hilary School may refer to:

- Saint Hilary School, Chicago, Illinois, see List of schools of the Roman Catholic Archdiocese of Chicago
- Saint Hilary School, Tiburon, California, see List of schools in the Roman Catholic Archdiocese of San Francisco
