= Eleri Cousins =

Historian, archaeologist, and university teacher

Eleri H Cousins FSA

Academic work
- Discipline: Archaeology
- Sub-discipline: Roman archaeology
- Institutions: University of St Andrews; University of Lancaster; Durham University

Eleri H Cousins FSA (b. 1987) is an archaeologist and assistant professor at Durham University, whose work focusses on the role of religion in the construction of provincial identity in the Roman Empire, especially in Britannia, Gaul, and Germania.

== Biography ==
Cousins' undergraduate study, in Archaeology and Classics, was at Stanford University. Subsequently, she studied for a master's degree and PhD at the University of Cambridge. She was a lecturer at the University of St Andrews (2016-2019) and then at the University of Lancaster (2019-2024), before moving to her current role at Durham in 2025. Cousins was elected as a fellow of the Society of Antiquaries of London on 17 June 2021.

== Select publications ==
- Cousins E. 2014 "Votive Objects and Ritual Practice at the King's Spring at Bath", Theoretical Roman Archaeology Journal 0 (2013) p. 52-64. doi:10.16995/TRAC2013_52_64
- Cousins, E. 2016. "An Imperial Image: The Bath Gorgon in Context", Britannia 47, 99–118.
- Cousins, E. 2020. The Sanctuary at Bath in the Roman Empire. Cambridge University Press.
