= Hilarios Karl-Heinz Ungerer =

German bishop (born 1941)

Hilarios Karl-Heinz Ungerer (born 1941 in Nuremberg) is a bishop of the Free Catholic Church in Munich, a small Independent Catholic denomination. Ungerer, with Bishop Roberto Garrido Padin, ordained Bishop Rómulo Antonio Braschi in 1998, who ordained a group of women known as the Danube Seven in 2002.

== History ==
In 1967, Ungerer was ordained as a priest in the independent Catholic church movement in Germany twice, and was consecrated as a bishop several years later. (Note: Ungerer was initially ordained as a priest by Eglise Catholique Gallicane Autocéphale Bishop Jean Damge (religious name Cyprian) in 1967. He was first consecrated as a bishop by (religious name Mar Emanuel) in 1970.)

Ungerer opened a storefront church in Munich. In 1976, he became part of the German branch of the Mariavite Church, On 6 October 1976 Ungerer was consecrated sub conditione as a bishop by Mariavite Bishop Norbert Maas, but on 8 August 1978 he was separated from that association.

Since then Ungerer has led the Free Catholic Church in Germany, considered to be a German expression of the independent Brazilian Catholic Apostolic Church.
