= Hilary Bell =

Hilary Bell may refer to:

- Hilary Bell (swimmer) (born 1991), Canadian swimmer
- Hilary Bell (writer) (born 1966), Australian writer
- Hilary Bell (television producer) (1965–2010), British reality television pioneer

== See also ==
- Hilari Bell (born 1958), American fantasy writer
