= Hillary Carlip =

American author and visual artist

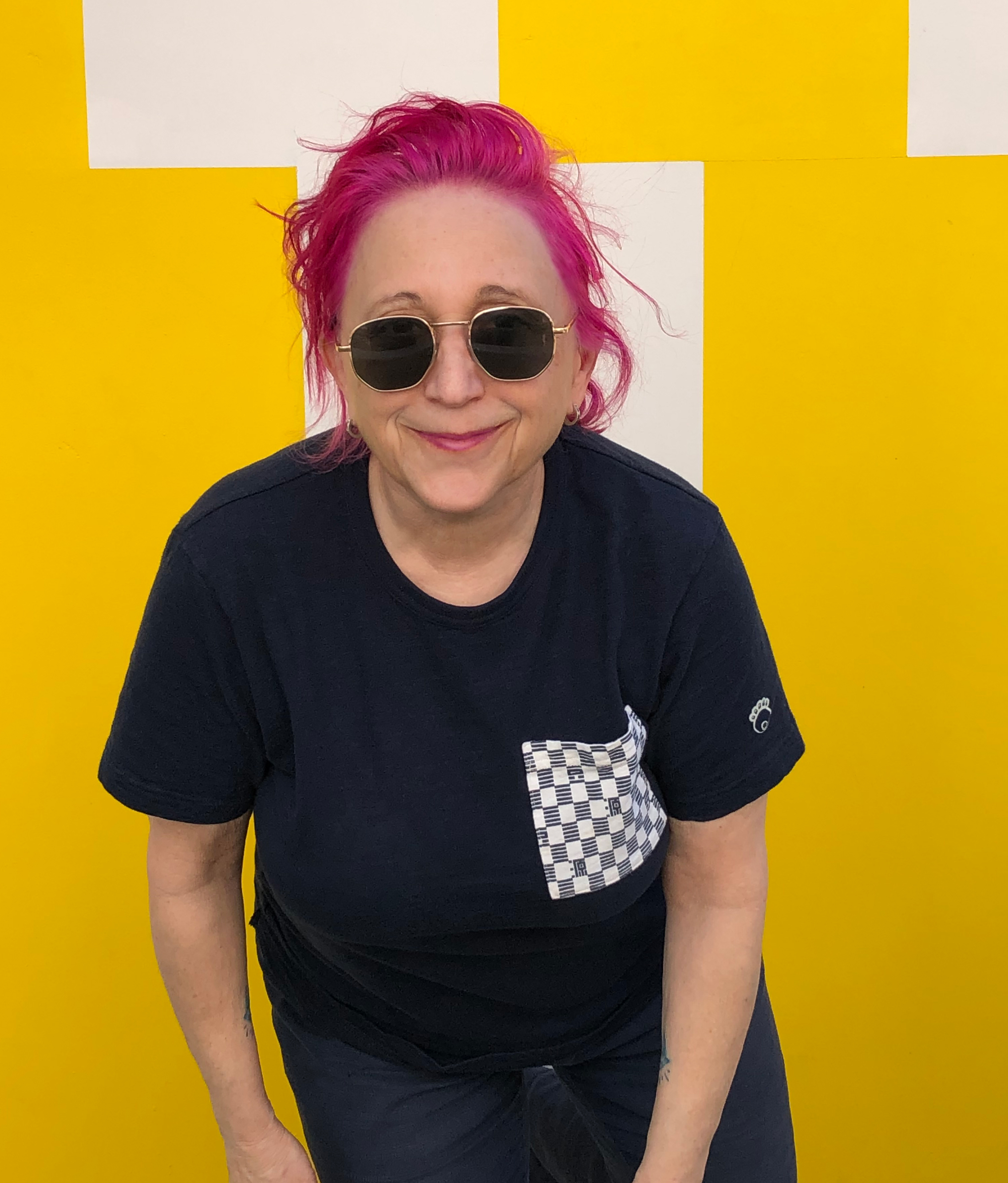
- Hillary Carlip
- Born: October 20, 1956 (age 69); Los Angeles, California, US
- Occupations: Author and Visual Artist

Hillary Carlip is an American best-selling author of six books and a visual artist whose work has been featured in museum shows alongside Andy Warhol and Damien Hirst. Her latest release, Willis Wonderland: The Legendary House of Atomic Kitsch is an architectural pop-up book on steroids celebrating Hall of Fame songwriter Allee Willis (September, Boogie Wonderland, Friends theme song, etc.), her iconic Streamline Moderne home, and its world-renowned collection of pop-culture kitsch. Hillary is also a graphic and motion designer whose animated collage short film Subterranean Spirits has won awards on the festival circuit.

== Books ==
Carlip's first book, Girl Power: Young Women Speak Out, was published in 1995. It was selected by the New York Public Library for inclusion on its "Best Books for Teens" list, and Hillary appeared on Oprah to promote the book.

Her second book, Zine Scene, which she designed herself and co-wrote with Francesca Lia Block, won an American Library Association Award.

Carlip's third book, Queen of the Oddballs: And Other True Stories from a Life Unaccording to Plan, was an American Booksellers Association Book Sense Pick Best Seller, a Lambda Literary Award finalist in two categories (humor and memoir), and was selected by Borders as one of the Best Literary Memoirs of 2006.

Her fourth book, A'la Cart: The Secret Lives of Grocery Shoppers (Virgin Books), received raves including a starred review from Publishers Weekly, who cited Carlip's "humor, grace and brilliantly creative eye," and called the book a "hilarious, delightful, unique achievement."

Carlip's fifth book, Find Me, I'm Yours, was an interactive Storyverse in a new genre coined by Carlip – CLICK LIT®-- conceived from the start as an ever-expanding, multi-platform creation which included a novel, 33 custom websites Carlip designed and created, and streaming shows.

== Other creative projects ==
As a visual artist, Carlip's work has been shown at several galleries in Los Angeles, New York City, and Chicago. Her work was most recently featured alongside Andy Warhol and Damien Hirst in a museum show called Stocked: Contemporary Art from the Grocery Aisle. She is also included in the show's catalogue/book (University of Washington Press).

In 2001, Carlip founded web production and design company, Fly HC Multimedia, and she has designed and produced hundreds of award-winning, custom websites for celebrities (including Jennifer Aniston), corporations, the Australian Government, authors, web series, artists, non-profits, and more.

Carlip was the creator, editor and host of the literary website "Fresh Yarn" which hosted works written by a diverse range of writers, performers and personalities (from 2004 to 2010). She has also been an NPR commentator, having written and recorded pieces for All Things Considered. Along with Josh Kilmer-Purcell, Danielle Trussoni, and Maria Dahvana Headley, she was a founding member of The Memoirists Collective, a group that sought new talent in nonfiction.

From 1999 to 2001 she was co-president, Founder, and Executive Creative Director of the teen web network VOXXY.

Carlip's first film script, SKIRTS, co-written with Miss Congeniality co-writer, Katie Ford, sold to Columbia Studios. She has also done script rewrites for animated films for Disney including An Extremely Goofy Movie.

Carlip was also the lead of the "all-girl, all ex-con" band Angel and the Reruns and has performed as a juggler and fire eater with The Flying Karamazov Brothers.

== Selected bibliography ==
- Girl Power: Young Women Speak Out (Warner Books, 1995)
- Zine Scene (Girl Press, 1999)
- Queen of the Oddballs: And Other True Stories from a Life Unaccording to Plan (HarperCollins, May 2006)
- FIRED!: Tales of the Canned, Canceled, Downsized, & Dismissed (Simon and Schuster's Touchstone Books, 2006)
- A La Cart:The Secret Lives of Grocery Shoppers (2008)
- Find Me I’m Yours (RosettaBooks, November 2014)

== Awards and nominations ==
- American Library Association
- Finalist, Lambda Literary Award (humor, memoir)
- Bandie Broadband Award, “Newest New Thing” (2000)
- The Gong Show winner
- Borders as one of the "Best Literary Memoirs of 2006"
