= Storefront church =

Church housed in a former commercial building

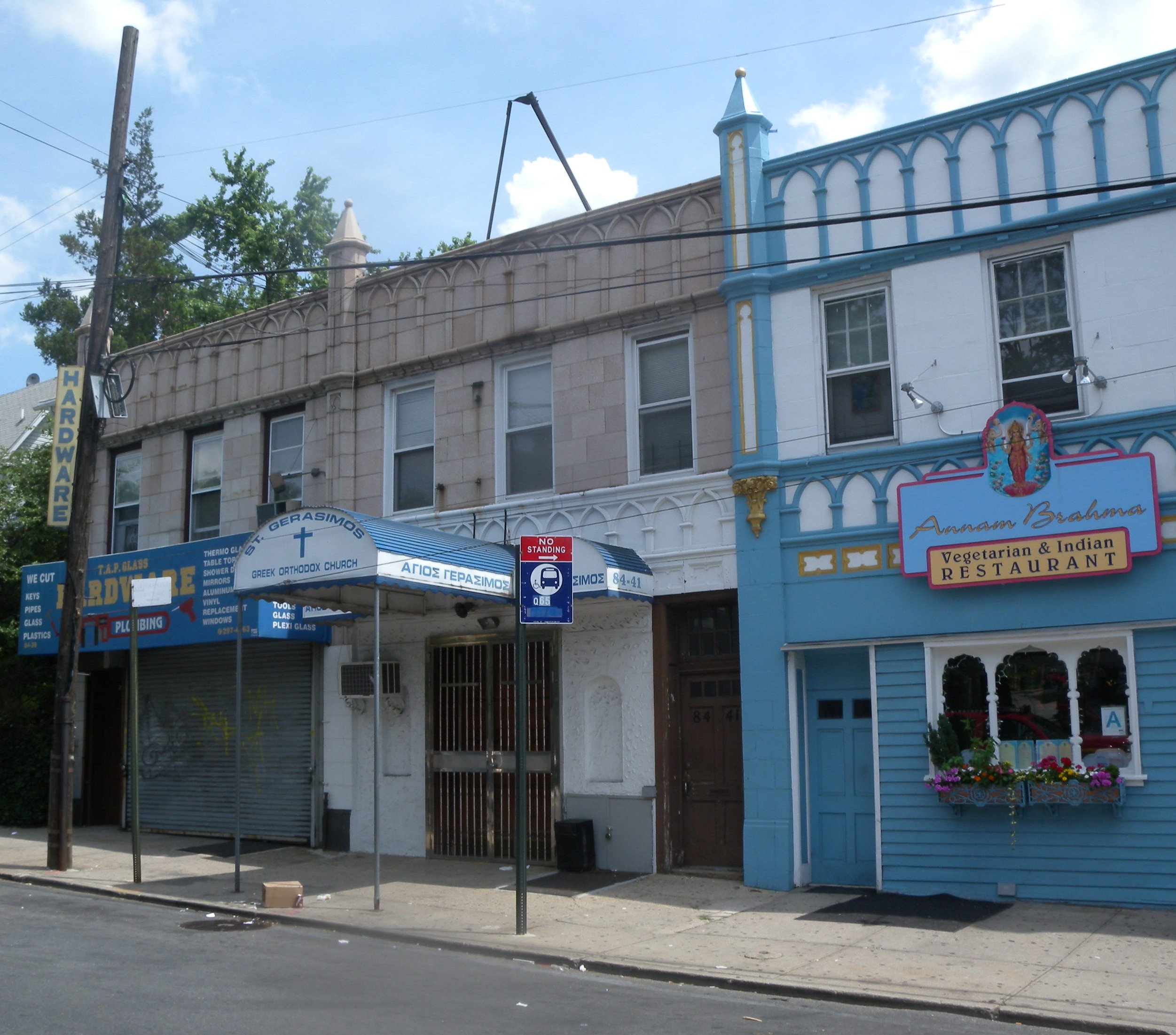
A Greek Orthodox church between a restaurant and a hardware store in an ethnically mixed neighborhood in Queens, New York City

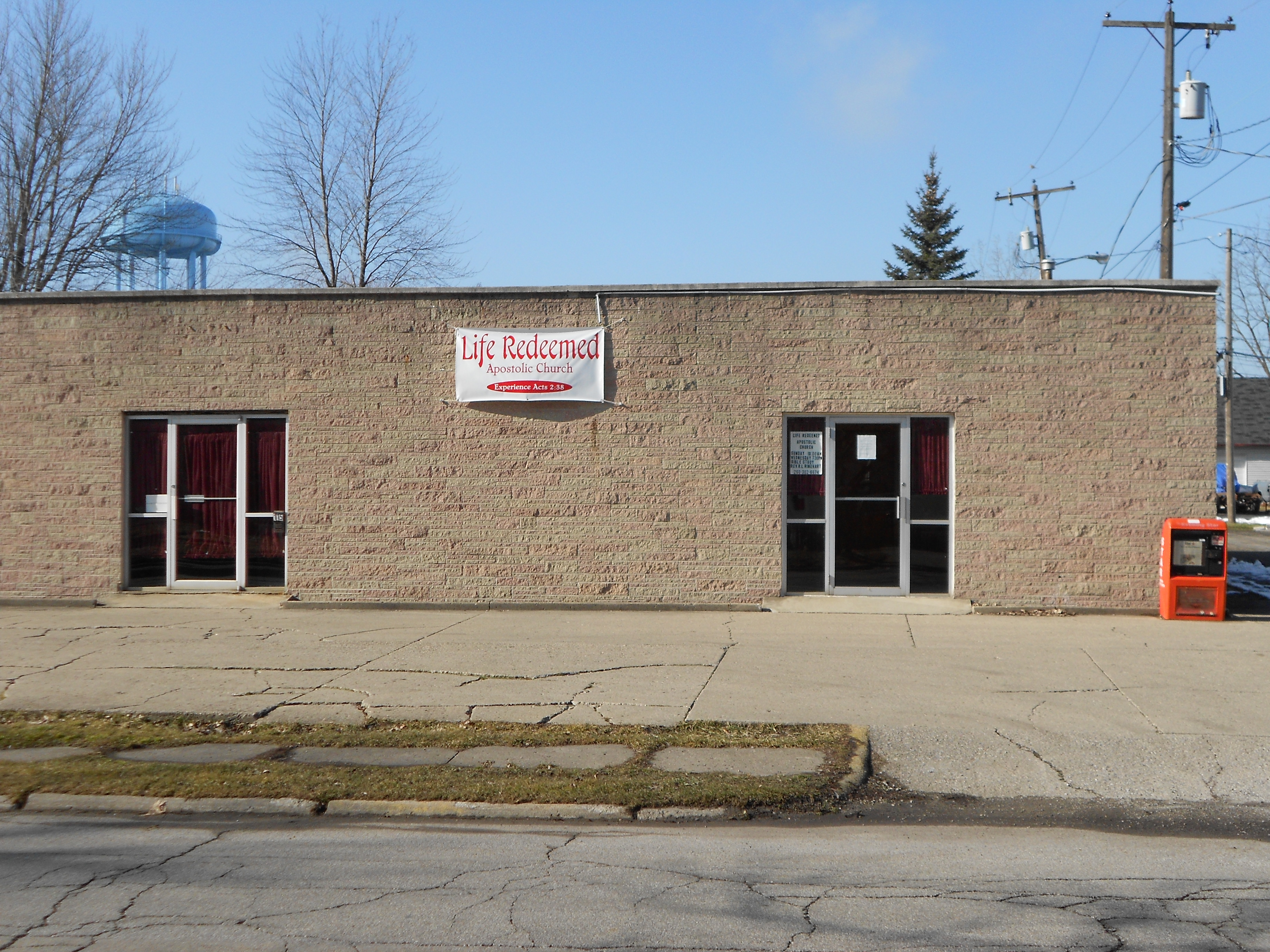
A storefront church in Auburn, Indiana, located in a building that was originally a supermarket.

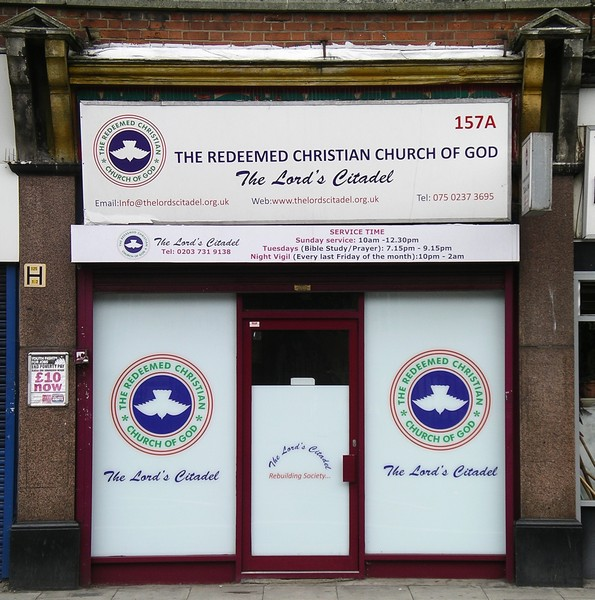
Storefront church in England

A storefront church is a church, usually in the North American context of the United States, and to a much lesser extent, Canada, that is housed in a storefront or strip mall building that formerly had a commercial purpose.

== Use ==
Often, the interior of a building of this kind was converted to ecclesiastical use simply by putting in chairs, pews, and a makeshift pulpit. Like other churches, it may serve as a social and religious hub for an ethnic enclave. Many storefronts emerged in the urban centers of the Northern United States in the late 19th century and were filled with poor former slaves leaving their former lives behind. Today, many storefront churches are both religious houses of worship and centers of social development and free speech in many poor African American communities to express their feelings about the struggles and hardships they face every day in their lives, as well as churches for them to come together and worship and fellowship in. They also can provide a focal point for community unity and engagement.

Storefronts are still very much a part of the Black church experience today. The storefront church has also emerged within other cultures as well. A PBS report said “Storefront churches today are not just Black and urban. Many have recently been established in Latino- and Asian-dominated neighborhoods, as well as poorer rural communities, typically serving similar functions as the storefront churches in historically Black communities.” Storefront churches may still be found throughout the United States, among White and Latino neighborhoods as well as African American ones.

== Examples ==
The former Gemini Lounge used by the Roy DeMeo Crew of the Gambino Crime Family became an African American Pentecostal storefront church in 1997 long after the building was abandoned by the crime family.
