= Hilarion (name) =

Hilarion is a male form of a Latin-derived name, related to the name Hilary which in modern times is mainly feminine.

== People with the given name ==
- Hilarion the Great (291–371), anchorite
- Hilarion the Younger (8th/9th century), Byzantine abbot
- Hilarion the Iberian (born c. 822), Georgian monk
- Hilarion Alfeyev (born 1966), Russian Orthodox bishop, church historian, and composer
- Hilarión Daza (1840–1894), President of Bolivia from 1876–1879
- Hilarion of Kiev (11th century), Russian Orthodox bishop
- Hilarion-Pit Lessard (1913–1984), Canadian politician
- Hilarion (Prikhodko) (1924–2008), Russian Orthodox priest in Novgorod
- Hilarion Vendégou (1941–2020), high chief of the Isle of Pines in New Caledonia
- Master Hilarion, an Ascended Master in Theosophy
- Metropolitan Ilarion or Hilarion, various Eastern Orthodox bishops
- Anne-Hilarion de Cotentin de Tourville (1642–1701), French naval commander

== People with the surname ==
- Auguste Hilarion, comte de Kératry (1769–1859), French poet, novelist, short story writer, literary critic, historian, and politician

== Other people ==
- Hilarion, magical name of Marjorie Cameron
- Sister Hilarion, magical name of Jeanne Robert Foster

== Fictional characters ==
- Prince Hilarion, one of the protagonists in the Gilbert & Sullivan comic opera Princess Ida
- Hilarion (Giselle), a gamekeeper in Adolphe Adam's romantic ballet

== See also ==
- Saint-Hilarion, a commune in France
- Ilarion, a variant of the name
