= List of storms named Hilary =

The name Hilary has been used for eleven tropical cyclones in the Eastern Pacific Ocean and for one in the South-West Indian Ocean.

In the Eastern Pacific Ocean:

- Tropical Depression Hilary (1967) – weak system that was downgraded to a tropical depression in post-analysis
- Hurricane Hilary (1971) – a Category 2 hurricane that stayed at sea
- Tropical Storm Hilary (1975) – moderate tropical storm that formed in the open ocean
- Hurricane Hilary (1981) – Category 1 hurricane that stayed at sea
- Hurricane Hilary (1987) – Category 3 hurricane that paralleled the Mexican coast
- Hurricane Hilary (1993) – another Category 3 hurricane that also moved parallel to the Mexican coast
- Hurricane Hilary (1999) – a Category 1 hurricane that moved near Baja California, but dissipated before affecting land
- Hurricane Hilary (2005) – a Category 2 hurricane that formed near Mexico but moved out to sea
- Hurricane Hilary (2011) – strong Category 4 hurricane that paralleled the Mexican coast
- Hurricane Hilary (2017) – Category 2 hurricane that also formed near Mexico
- Hurricane Hilary (2023) – Category 4 hurricane that made landfall as a tropical storm along the Baja California peninsula, dumping torrential rain there and in Southern California, causing $915 million in damages.

In the South-West Indian Ocean:

- Tropical Depression Hilary (1966)
