= Eleri =

Eleri (the Welsh form of the masculine given name Hilarus or Hilarius) may refer to:

- Pope Hilarius (5th century) in Welsh contexts
- Eleri, daughter of Brychan Brycheiniog, the Welsh, 5th-century king
- Saint Eleri (7th century), Welsh prince and abbot, cousin of Saint Winifred
- Eleri Cousins (born 1987), archaeologist and Lecturer in Roman History at the University of Lancaster
- Eleri Earnshaw (born 1985), Welsh footballer
- Eleri Mills (born 1955), Welsh painter
- Eleri Morgan (comedian), Welsh comedian and actress
- Eleri Rees (née Morgan; born 1953), Welsh judge
- Eleri Siôn (born 1971), Welsh radio and television host
- Sian Eleri, Welsh radio presenter

== See also ==
- West Eleri, a village in Kerala in India
- East Eleri, a grama panchayat in Kerala in India
