= Les Wexner =

American businessman (born 1937)

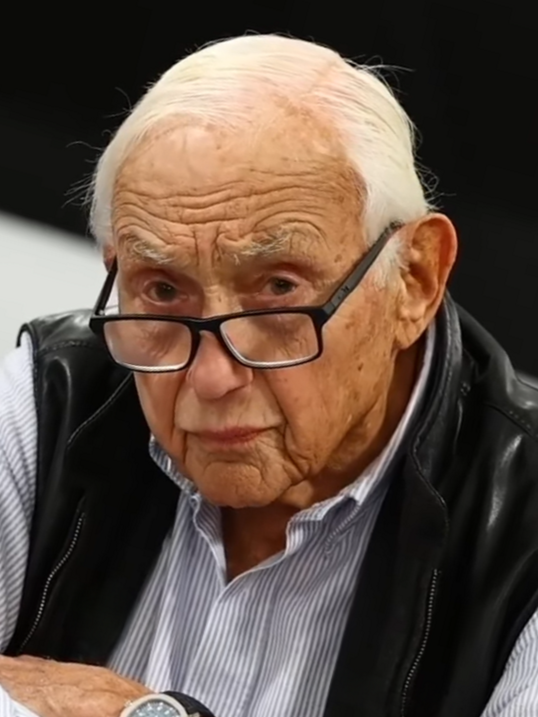
- Wexner in 2026
- Born: Leslie Herbert Wexner; September 8, 1937 (age 89); Dayton, Ohio, U.S.
- Education: Ohio State University (BBA)
- Political party: Republican (before 2018); Independent (2018–present)
- Spouse: Abigail Koppel (m. 1993)
- Children: 4

Leslie Herbert Wexner (born September 8, 1937) is an American billionaire businessman and political activist. He is the co-founder and chair emeritus of Bath & Body Works, Inc. He has been the principal in Abercrombie & Fitch, Victoria's Secret and La Senza, amongst several other retail corporations.

In 1991, Wexner and billionaire Charles Bronfman formed an informal pro-Israel lobby group, called the Study Group or 'Mega Group'. The organization is said to have lobbied for US foreign policy in the Middle East alongside philanthropic activities.

Between 1987 and 2007, Wexner retained Jeffrey Epstein as his financial manager, whom he granted significant control of his finances, including power of attorney. Epstein reportedly earned a significant fraction of his wealth through his services provided to Wexner. In 2007, Wexner cut ties with Epstein, who was convicted in 2008 for soliciting a minor for prostitution in Florida.

In February 2026, Epstein files releases revealed that the FBI had once listed Wexner as a potential Epstein co-conspirator. Wexner has denied involvement in any of Epstein's offending, and according to Epstein victims' lawyer Brad Edwards, there is no evidence to suggest Wexner was in the company of Epstein during his crimes.

== Early life and education ==
Wexner was born in Dayton, Ohio, on September 8, 1937, to parents Bella née Cabakoff (1908–2001) and Harry Louis Wexner (1899–1975). Both his parents were of Russian-Jewish origin. His father was born in Russia and his mother was born in Williamsburg, Brooklyn. The family claimed before their immigration to the United States that they worked for the Russian Czars. They were from the Minsk Governorate.

Cabakoff moved to Columbus, Ohio, as a toddler. They lived on Stauring Street, an alley in South Columbus. Wexner has a younger sister, Susan.

Wexner attended Bexley High School and Ohio State University. In 1953, he won a minor award for his essay, published in the Ohio Jewish Chronicle, titled "Why I Love and Respect Judaism". He initially expressed an interest in architecture, but graduated in 1959 with a major in business administration. While a student at Ohio State University, he joined the Sigma Alpha Mu fraternity. Wexner served in the Air National Guard. He briefly attended the Moritz College of Law.

== Career ==
Wexner began his retail career working in his parents' clothing store, "Leslie's", which had been named after him. According to Wexner, he began working at his parents' store so they could take a vacation. Wexner analyzed the sales and inventory, identifying the most and least profitable items. When his father refused to adjust the inventory, Wexner decided to open his own store.

In 1963, Wexner's aunt lent him $5,000 (equivalent to $53,000 in 2025), which he combined with a matching loan from a bank in order to start The Limited. The store took its name from its focus on moderately priced merchandise, such as skirts, sweaters and shirts, that sold quickly and quickly generated revenue. Wexner opened the first store on August 10, 1963, in the Kingsdale Shopping Center in Upper Arlington, Ohio, a suburb of Columbus. One year later, Wexner's parents closed their store and joined their son in running The Limited. He opened the second Limited store in August 1964. He took Limited Brands public in 1969, listed as LTD on the NYSE.

A. Alfred Taubman served as a mentor for Wexner, starting in the mid-1960s, and the two partnered on many deals involving Taubman's shopping malls. In 1972, Robert H. Morosky, an active Catholic fund raiser, sold his house and moved into a small apartment in order to buy stock in The Limited and to serve as Vice Chairman of The Limited's board having full confidence and belief in Wexner. Morosky resigned in 1987 and gave a number of interviews decades later criticizing Wexner's closeness with Jeffrey Epstein.

Wexner expanded The Limited considerably in the 1970s, having opened the 100th store in 1976. He took on significant debt in 1978 to purchase the importer Mast Industries, which provided him with essential business advantages over competitors. In 1982, Wexner spent $105 million to purchase the much larger Lane Bryant retail chain of plus-sized clothing which came with $30 million in debt and acquired the lingerie business Victoria's Secret from Roy Raymond for an undisclosed amount of stock, and $1 million with Raymond later describing Wexner as "very guarded", stating, "When I met him, it was as if he met the devil." Six months later, when Raymond was facing bankruptcy, he contacted Wexner and offered to sell Victoria's Secret. By 1992, Victoria's Secret was worth an estimated $1 billion, and became known for the use of supermodels featured in an annual fashion show, overseen by Ed Razek. In 1993, Wexner hired Len Schlesinger, a Harvard Business School professor, whom he later appointed as a company director, to advise him.

Over the years, Wexner built L Brands, a retailing and marketing conglomerate that included Victoria's Secret, Pink (Victoria's Secret for teens), Bath & Body Works, Henri Bendel, The White Barn Candle Company, and La Senza. Previous brands that were spun off include Lane Bryant, Abercrombie & Fitch, Lerner New York, The Limited Too (now Tween Brands, Inc.), Structure 9, Aura Science, The Limited (which closed its brick-and-mortar stores while retaining its online presence), and Express (which closed its Canadian stores and hundreds of its U.S.-based stores). In 2012, CNN Money described Wexner as the longest serving CEO of a Fortune 500 company. He was on Harvard Business Review's Top 100 Best Performing CEOs in the World, ranked number 11 in 2015, and number 34 in 2016. In February 2020, Wexner announced that he was transitioning from CEO of L Brands into the role of chair emeritus.

=== Corporate board memberships ===
Wexner was on the board of directors of Banc One from at least 1986 to 1991. Until 2002, he also sat on the Board of Directors of Hollinger International together with Henry Kissinger. He also served on the board of Sotheby's, American Ballet Theatre and the Whitney Museum of American Arts.

== Association with Jeffrey Epstein ==
Wexner being deposed by the House Oversight Committee to answer questions on his relationship with Epstein on February 18, 2026

In 1987, Wexner's friend Robert Meister recommended he meet Epstein for financial advice. By this stage, Epstein's firm was offering tax planning to wealthy clients. Epstein was later hired by Wexner, and reportedly won over his trust by telling him that one of his financial advisors, Harold Levin, was stealing from him. According to Levin, Epstein's had falsely accused him – and he resigned after attempting to convince Wexner that his new financial advisor was untrustworthy.

According to a New York Times investigation, Epstein sowed fear in his wealthy clients, by convincing them "that their finances were a mess, that their advisers and even family members were inept or exploiting them and that only one man had the wherewithal to save them".

Wexner granted Epstein significant control of his businesses and finances. In July 1991, Wexner granted Epstein power of attorney and also instated him as a trustee on the board of the Wexner Foundation. Several of Wexner's colleagues were concerned about Epstein's growing influence over the billionaire.

With control of his finances, Epstein reportedly began paying himself significant sums. He purchased his mansion in Palm Beach, and began spending time with Donald Trump, attending parties at Mar-a-Lago featuring calendar girls.

Wexner purchased his New York property, the Herbert N. Straus House, in 1989 and sold it to Epstein in the mid-1990s following Wexner's marriage to Abigail.

In the mid 1990s, several executives of L Brands reported concerns that Epstein was misrepresenting himself as a recruiter for Victoria's Secret models. In 1997, an aspiring model Alicia Arden filed a police report in Los Angeles, alleging that Epstein had presented himself as a recruiter for Victoria's Secret, met her in a hotel room, and attempted to undress and "manhandle" her. A year prior, in 1996, artist Maria Farmer reported to the FBI that Epstein had allegedly stolen her photos of her teenage sisters, while she was on an artist residency at Wexner's property in Ohio.

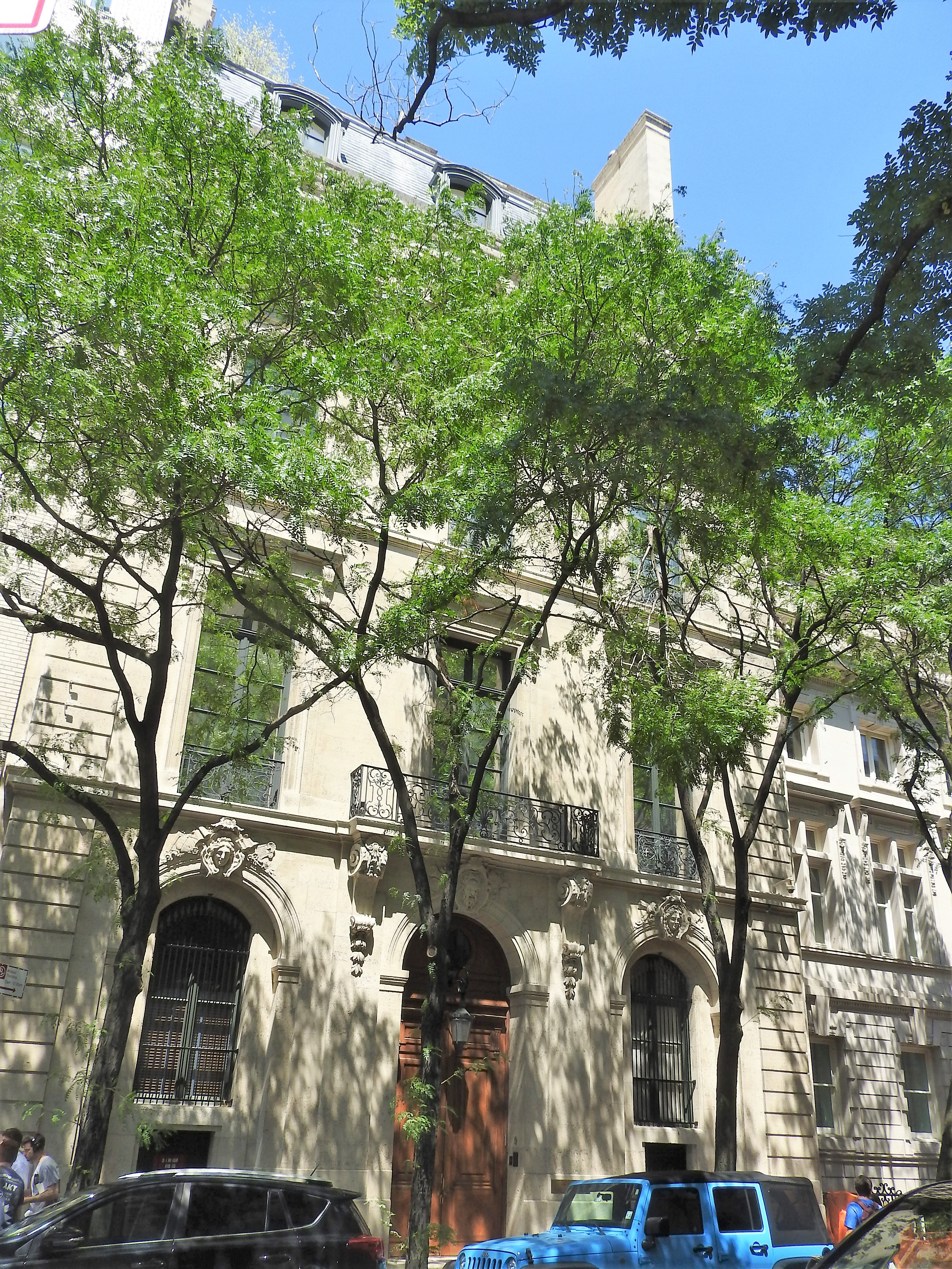
The Herbert N. Straus House on the Upper East Side

In early 2006, Epstein was charged in Florida with "multiple counts of molestation and unlawful sexual activity with a minor." The New York Times reported that in 2007, 18 months after the charges were filed, Wexner cut his ties with Epstein. Epstein was convicted in 2008.

In August 2019, following Epstein's second incarceration and prior to his death, Wexner addressed the Wexner Foundation, releasing a written statement that his former financial advisor, Jeffrey Epstein, had "misappropriated vast sums of money" from him and from his family. Wexner retained the services of Debevoise & Plimpton criminal defense attorney and former U.S. Attorney for the Southern District of New York Mary Jo White.

Following the passage of the 2025 Epstein Files Transparency Act, Wexner faced additional public scrutiny. In January 2026, Wexner was subpoenaed by the US House Oversight Committee of Congress to sit for a deposition. In February 2026, Wexner was named as being on a July 2019 list of potential Epstein co-conspirators within an FBI email. However, according to Epstein victims' lawyer Brad Edwards, there is no evidence to suggest that "Wexner was in Epstein's company at the time of his crimes."

== In popular culture ==
Wexner is referenced in the 2010 film The Social Network, during a scene in which Sean Parker (Justin Timberlake) tells Mark Zuckerberg (Jesse Eisenberg) a parable about Roy Raymond and his founding of Victoria's Secret.

In 2022, he was mentioned in the pop song "Victoria's Secret", for profiting off women and contributing to their toxic body ideals. When Jax sings that "I know Victoria's secret, and girl, you wouldn't believe. She's an old man who lives in Ohio making money off of girls like me", she is referring to Wexner.

Wexner's relationship with Epstein was one of the subjects of the 2022 Hulu documentary Victoria's Secret: Angels and Demons.

== Philanthropy ==
In 1989, Wexner and his mother Bella were the first to make a $1 million personal donation to the United Way. Both of their names were inscribed in marble and are on display in the lobby of the United Way Headquarters in Alexandria, Virginia. Wexner was listed by Forbes in 2017, the wealthiest of seven billionaires from Ohio who made the list. He was a major funder of the Wexner Center for the Arts at the Ohio State University, which is named in honor of his father. Wexner said that because "growing up, my folks moved around a lot, and I never got a good Jewish education", he felt unprepared to take leadership roles in his Orthodox Jewish community. So, in 1985, he joined Rabbi Herbert A. Friedman to establish the Wexner Foundation's first core program, aimed "to educate Jewish communal leaders in the history, thought, traditions, and contemporary challenges of the Jewish people".

=== Study group ===
In 1991, with billionaire Charles Bronfman, Wexner formed the Study Group, more widely known as the Mega Group, a loosely organized club of some of the country's wealthiest and most influential businessmen who were concerned with Jewish issues. Max Fischer, Michael Steinhardt, Leonard Abramson, Edgar Bronfman, and Laurence Tisch were some of the members. The group would meet twice a year for two days of seminars related to the topic of philanthropy and Judaism. As a pro-Israel lobby group, the organization is also said to have tried to influence US foreign policy in the Middle East. In 2003, it employed Republican political consultant Frank Luntz to help the group mobilize support for Israel.

In an April 1998 group meeting, Steven Spielberg spoke about his personal religious journey. The Study Group, which Wexner co-chaired with Charles Bronfman, went on to inspire a number of philanthropic initiatives such as the Partnership for Excellence in Jewish Education, Birthright Israel, and the upgrading of national Hillel.

=== Ohio State University ===
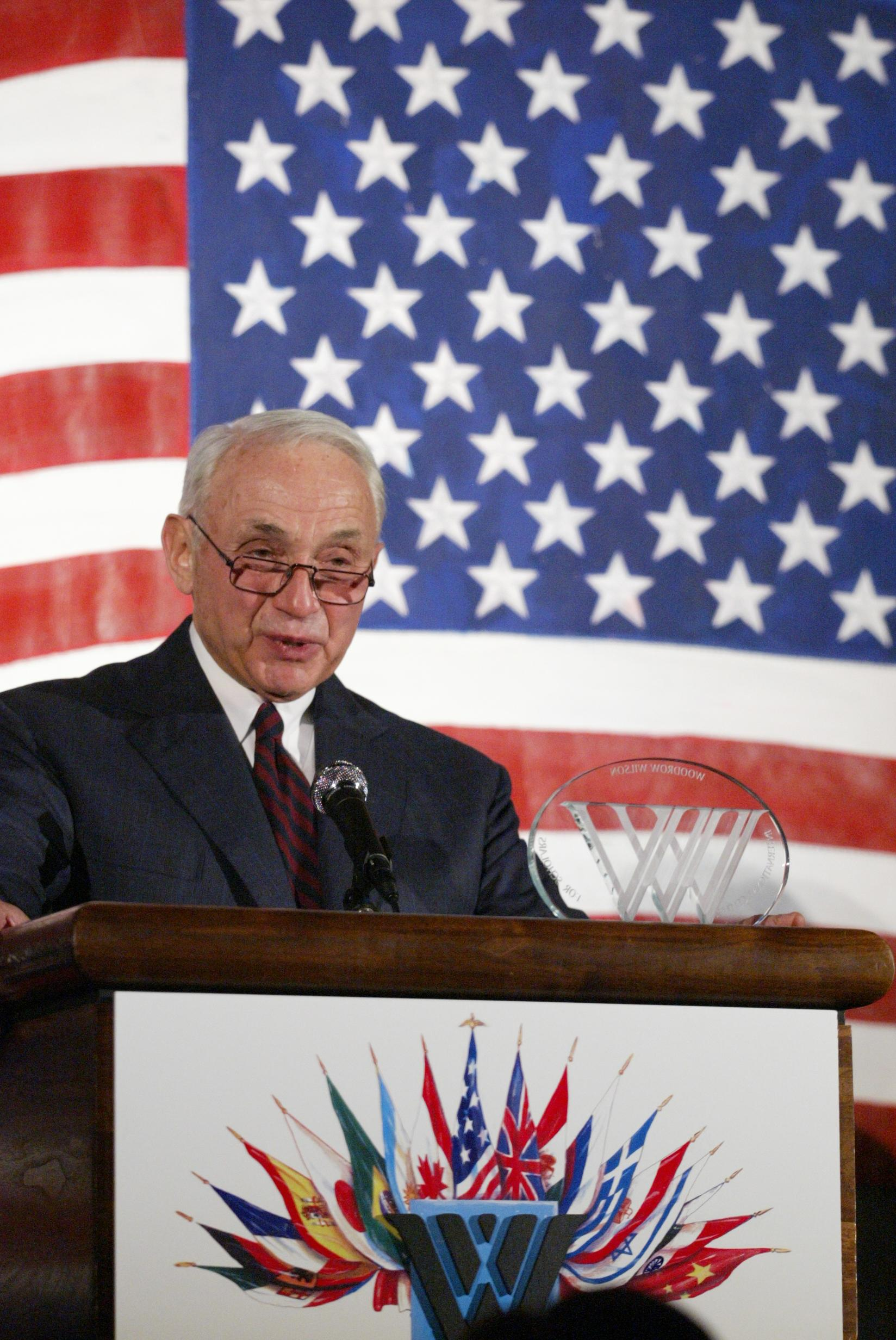
Wexner receives the Woodrow Wilson Award, 2004

Wexner served on the Board of Trustees of Ohio State University from 1988 to 1997. In December 2005, he was appointed to his second term and was elected chair in 2009. It was announced in June 2012 that his chairmanship would end eight years before his term expired. On May 11, 2004, Wexner received the Woodrow Wilson Award for Corporate Citizenship at a dinner in Columbus. The award was presented by the Woodrow Wilson International Center for Scholars of the Smithsonian Institution in Washington, D.C. On February 16, 2011, Wexner pledged a donation of $100 million to Ohio State, to be allocated to the university's academic Medical Center and James Cancer Hospital and Solove Research Institute, with additional gifts to the Wexner Center for the Arts and other areas. This gift is the largest in the university's history.

Through the L Brands Foundation, Wexner and L Brands contributed $163.4 million to the Columbus Foundation. On February 10, 2012, the Ohio State University board of trustees voted to rename the Ohio State University Medical Center to the Ohio State University Wexner Medical Center, commemorating "Mr. Wexner's indelible, lifelong legacy of leadership at Ohio State", according to university president E. Gordon Gee, during over 30 years of "ardent support" of the institution.

Wexner faced additional public scrutiny in late 2019 and early 2020, when a group of wrestlers who are survivors of the Ohio State University abuse scandal publicly called on state and federal officials to conduct further inquiry into Maria Farmer's allegations of sexual assault at the Wexner property. The wrestlers called for accountability for the Wexner family's alleged involvement in Epstein's abuse and raised the issue of the continuing influence of Abigail and Leslie Wexner serving as the "biggest and best-known benefactors" of the university.

Fallout from the scandal continued into the 2020s with particular focus paid to the part played by Wexner and his association with Epstein. Former wrestlers and their supporters criticized the university's board for failing to look into Wexner and in their opinion covering up the matter. Wexner's legal team had been stalling efforts by victims to subpoena Wexner. Former wrestlers and their supporters noted that board chair John Zeiger was a close friend of Wexner and that his daughter and law partner was Wexner's attorney. Zeiger did not recuse himself from matters regarding Wexner. On February 11, 2026, U.S. District Court for the Southern District of Ohio Judge Michael H. Watson denied Wexner's January motion to quash a previous subpoena, ordering him to attend a long-avoided deposition in a case regarding abuses by former Ohio State University staff physician Richard Strauss, who was implicated in the Ohio State University abuse scandal, before committing suicide in 2005.

== Personal life ==
In a 1985 article, Wexner discussed that he had trouble sleeping which he attributed to his dybbuk spirit that he dubbed "terminal shpilkes" (shpilkes being Yiddish for "pin", as in "on pins and needles"), "the demon that always wakes up in the morning with Wexner and tweaks and pulls at him". He noted it had been intermittently appearing since childhood, and attributed his driving, his bachelor lifestyle and his business drive to trying to escape the anxiety it caused, always having music playing as he could not stand the sound of silence. One girlfriend converted to Judaism and changed her name to "Cohen" after a year of dating Wexner. On January 23, 1993, Wexner married Abigail S. Koppel, an attorney. The couple has four children.

Formerly of the Bexley area, Wexner now lives in New Albany, a community northeast of Columbus. He owns a 30-room, $47 million, Georgian-inspired estate, on nearly 336 acres (1.36 km^{2}), that was built in 1990. The estate was, for 20 years, the location of the Annual New Albany Classic Invitational Grand Prix & Family Day (an equestrian show) benefiting The Center for Family Safety and Healing. In February 2018, Abigail Wexner announced the end of the event, citing the growing number of equestrian competitions. Wexner has owned the mid-18th century Foxcote House in Warwickshire, England, since 1997. Wexner was inducted as an honorary member of the 104th Sphinx Senior Class at Ohio State University on May 7, 2010.

== Political activities ==
George W. Bush appointed Wexner to serve in the Honorary Delegation to accompany him to Jerusalem for the celebration of the 60th anniversary of the State of Israel in May 2008. Wexner hosted a fundraiser in 2012 for Mitt Romney, and also donated $250,000 to Restore Our Future, Romney's super PAC. In 2015, Wexner donated $500,000 to the Right to Rise USA super PAC that supported the 2016 presidential campaign of Jeb Bush. The Columbus Dispatch reported on September 14, 2018, that Wexner had renounced his affiliation with the Republican Party, which he had been supporting since his college days, due to changes in its nature.

== Legal issues ==
=== Shapiro murder investigation ===
In 1985, Arthur L. Shapiro, a lawyer and partner at Columbus law firm Schwartz Shapiro Kelm & Warren, was assigned to represent The Limited account. Shapiro was to appear before a grand jury to testify about an illegal tax scheme that he had been involved in.

Days before his testimony, Shapiro was assassinated in a way that witnesses described as similar to a Mafia hit. Because of a potential nexus between Shapiro, Mafia, and Wexner, as part of the police investigation, many people and entities connected to Wexner were looked at for any connections to the mob. This was detailed in a police report, later dubbed "The Arthur Shapiro Murder File", which found some tenuous connections between Wexner and the mob, in some of Wexner's businesses, such as a trucking company. A local police chief said the report's theories were highly speculative and not based on hard evidence. The main suspect in Shapiro's murder remains Shapiro's business partner Berry Kessler, who had no connection to Wexner but had a history of murdering his (Kessler's) business partners by contracting Mafia hit men. Kessler was involved with Shapiro in the illegal tax avoidance schemes, had a motive to silence him, and was seen on the day after the murder giving a lot of cash to someone who matched witness descriptions of the killer. Kessler died in prison in 2005, having been convicted of a different murder, and never admitted to the Shapiro killing. The Shapiro murder was never officially solved.

=== Litigation ===
==== L Brands ====
In January 2021, an L Brands shareholder filed a lawsuit alleging L Brands and board members including Wexner, among others, created an "entrenched culture of misogyny, bullying, and harassment", and was alleged they were aware of crimes being committed by Jeffrey Epstein, breaching Wexner's fiduciary duty to the company and devalued the brand. On July 30, 2021, L Brands agreed to a $90 million settlement to resolve derivative lawsuits stemming from claims that combine Ohio and Delaware actions.

==== Survivors of Jeffrey Epstein ====
In April 2026, several women who were victims of Epstein filed lawsuits against both Wexner and the Wexner Foundation alleging that Wexner gave $200 million to Epstein from 1987 to 2007 and enabled the creation of Epstein's sex trafficking network.

== See also ==
- List of billionaires
- Mega Group
