= Steinhardt =

Steinhardt may refer to:

- Steinhardt School of Culture, Education, and Human Development, a division of New York University
- Steinhardt Social Research Institute, the Brandeis University institute for the study of religion and ethnicity
- Steinhardt (surname), people with the surname Steinhardt

== See also ==
- Steinhart–Hart equation, a model of the resistivity of semiconductors
- California Academy of Sciences, home of the Steinhardt Aquarium
- Steinhardt Foundation for Jewish Life
