= Study Group (Jewish group) =

Pro-Israel lobby group of Jewish entrepreneurs

The Mega Group was an informal group of influential Jewish entrepreneurs. It was founded in 1991 by Les Wexner and Charles Bronfman as the Study Group. The group met twice yearly for philanthropy and Judaism seminars. It is said to have had up to 50 members, including Hollywood director Steven Spielberg. Wexner led the group with Bronfman, and it inspired several philanthropic initiatives such as the Partnership for Excellence in Jewish Education, Birthright Israel, and support for the renewal of Hillel International. The group became known to a wider public through a Wall Street Journal report in May 1998.

As a pro-Israel lobby group, the organization is also said to have tried to influence US foreign policy in the Middle East. In 2003, it employed Republican political consultant Frank Luntz to help the group mobilize support for Israel.

== Members ==
The following is a partial list of people named as members of the group:

- Les Wexner
- Charles Bronfman
- Edgar Bronfman
- Max Fisher
- Michael Steinhardt
- Leonard Abramson
- Harvey Meyerhoff
- Laurence Tisch
- Charles Schusterman
- Lester Crown
- Ronald Lauder
- Marvin Lender
- Steven Spielberg
