= The Limited =

American clothing brand

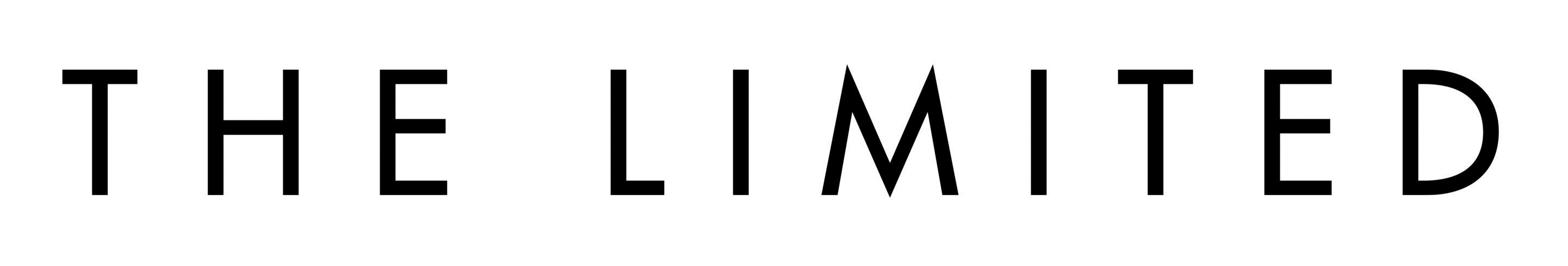
- Type: Private
- Industry: Clothing
- Founded: 1963; 63 years ago Upper Arlington, Ohio, U.S.
- Headquarters: Charlotte, North Carolina
- Products: Shirts/tops, pants, denim, jackets, sweaters, skirts, dresses, and accessories
- Parent: Sycamore Partners
- Website: https://www.lb.com

The Limited is an American clothing brand sold exclusively through Belk. The Limited began with operating retail stores between the early 1960s and the late 2010s. In 2017, it became a brand owned by the private equity firm Sycamore Partners.

== History ==
Bella Cabakoff was born in Williamsburg, Brooklyn and moved to Columbus, Ohio as a toddler. At 21, she became the youngest buyer for the Lazarus department store chain. In 1951, after spending over 20 years with Lazarus, she and her husband Harry Wexner opened a women's clothing store named Leslie's (after their son) on State Street. This store became the training ground for Leslie Wexner. In 1963, he borrowed $5,000 from his aunt and $5,000 from the bank and opened a store at the Kingsdale Shopping Center in Upper Arlington. This store was named "The Limited" because the store focused on clothing for younger women, unlike his parents' general merchandise store. Later in 1964, Bella and Harry closed their store to join their son in his venture.

The original board consisted of only the three family members and longtime friend of Harry and Bella, Jim Waldron (who served as senior vice president): Bella Wexner (who served as secretary until her death in 2001), Harry as chairman (who served until his death in 1975), and Leslie, who succeeded his father as the chairman and later became CEO. He and his family continue to control 17% of LTD. In 1969, Wexner took Limited Brands public, listed as LTD on the NYSE. In 1977, The Limited moved into its main headquarters on Morse Road in Columbus. In 2009, most headquarters operations moved to New Albany, Ohio.

The 1980s started a string of acquisitions: In 1982, the Victoria's Secret brand, store, and catalogue were purchased from Roy Raymond for $1 million (~$2.82 million in 2025). Also in 1982, 207 Lane Bryant stores were purchased. In 1985, the exclusive Henri Bendel store on Fifth Avenue in New York City was purchased for $10 million and 798 Lerner stores for $297 million. Finally, in 1988, 25 Abercrombie & Fitch stores were purchased for $46 million (~$108 million in 2025). The Limited then ended its ownership of the A&F brand in 1996, when it was spun off into a publicly traded company. In 1980, Limited founded Limited Express, later known simply as Express.

The 1990s included the initial development of the Limited Too (which was renamed Justice in 2008), Bath & Body Works, Structure, and Victoria's Secret Beauty. Galyan's, a sporting goods store, was also purchased. Later in 1998, several Bath & Body Works stores were converted to The White Barn Candle Company stores to begin a home fragrance brand.

On August 3, 2007, Limited Brands transferred 75% ownership of its flagship Limited chain to buyout firm Sun Capital Partners Inc. In 2010, the remaining shares were sold to Sun Capital Partners Inc.

In 2013, Diane Ellis, president and chief operating officer of Brooks Brothers, became the CEO of The Limited. In October 2016, after a series of challenges, she oversaw the closing of The Limited's New York design studio, and eventually left to join Chico's, leaving CFO John Buell to serve as interim CEO.

In January 2017, The Limited announced that the brand was exploring a potential sale with potential suitors, the brand said it would continue to sell apparel through its digital store.

In February 2017, the brand was purchased by Sycamore Partners. The Limited began being sold exclusively at Belk, Inc., a Southern department store in the Sycamore portfolio. The Limited products are also available for purchase through Belk online.

On February 23, 2021, it was announced that Belk, which was the only remnant of The Limited left, had filed Chapter 11 bankruptcy in Houston, the first step in an organization plan that would allow Belk's owner Sycamore Partners to cede a large stake in the company to its lenders while maintaining control of the company. On February 24, Belk was successfully able to emerge from bankruptcy, and The Limited is still currently being sold at Belk as of 2023.
