= Study Group (disambiguation) =

A study group is a small group of people that meet and discuss shared fields of study.

Study Group is a for-profit education provider.

Study Group may also refer to:

- Study Group (TV series), South Korean television series
- Study Group (Jewish group), group of Jewish entrepreneurs
