= Co-option =

Political term

Co-option, also known as co-optation and sometimes spelt cooption or cooptation, is a term with three common meanings. It may refer to:

- The process of adding members to an elite group at the discretion of members of the body, usually to manage opposition and so maintain the stability of the group. Outsiders are "co-opted" by being given a degree of power on the grounds of their elite status, specialist knowledge, or potential ability to threaten essential commitments or goals ("formal co-optation"). Co-optation may take place in many other contexts, such as a technique by a dictatorship to control opposition.
- The process by which a group subsumes or acculturates a smaller or weaker group with related interests, or the process by which one group gains converts from another group by replicating some aspects of it without adopting the full program or ideal ("informal co-optation"). Co-optation is associated with the cultural tactic of recuperation, and is often understood to be synonymous with it.
- A procedural mechanism where existing members of a legislative body, corporate board, or the like invite or elect additional members to join them, such as in British local government until 1972. This may be the mechanism by which one of the first two process occur.

== First sense ==
In a 1979 article for Harvard Business Review, consultants John Kotter and Leonard Schlesinger presented co-optation as a "form of manipulation" for dealing with employees who are resistant to new management programs:

Co-opting an individual usually involves giving him or her a desirable role in the design or implementation of the change. Co-opting a group involves giving one of its leaders, or someone it respects, a key role in the design or implementation of a change. This is not a form of participation, however, because the initiators do not want the advice of the co-opted, merely his or her endorsement.

=== Reasons for use ===
Two common uses of co-option are firstly, to recruit members who have specific skills or abilities needed by the group which are not available among existing members. Secondly, to fill vacancies which could not be filled by the usual process (normally election), e.g. if suitable candidates appear subsequently. Co-opted members may or may not have the same rights as the elected members of a group (such as the right to vote on motions), depending on the rules of the group. Sociologist William Gamson defined co-optation as "challengers gaining access to the public policy process but without achieving actual policy changes."

=== Recruiting ===
The financial industry has been traditionally a work place of white men which has caused the non-white men to oppose the industry and also demanded a more feminist outlook. Hence the industry has begun to initiate inclusion programs that targets the recruitment of minorities. This can be a form of co-optation as the current hegemony is formed of a homogenous group of white males and the adversaries are added group. While the intentions are unclear, the financial industry uses some mechanisms to co-opt diversity candidates. One being accelerated recruitment where the diversity candidates are given job offers before public job advertisements making them subject to competition over best candidates. Diverse recruitment is promoted in media discourse as a business case where diverse teams perform better, generate growth and profit.

In subsuming their opponents, the financial industry has an appeal towards outsiders and carries prestige that diminishes the minority groups critique towards it and is a method of controlling the group that was once its opponent. The allure of financial industry is a form of co-optation that reduces the critique towards it.

China has tried to assert its dominance over the Xinjiang Uyghur Autonomous Region which has become one of the most heavily policed areas as a result of many conflicts between the two. In an effort to reduce unrest, China began to recruit Uyghurs to join the police force and patrol the Uyghur region i.e. the adversary is co-opted among the elite group to manage it. The work contract restricted from resigning from the job and offered a better pay with respect to formal government employment and requiring lower education level.

=== Financing industry ===
Traditional capitalism is the current economic order which is challenged by Islamic banking that wants to demarcate itself by promoting co-operation instead of competition by prohibiting interests. Financial ventures would be funded by Profit and loss sharing that doesn't include interest or uncertainty which are both not allowed in Islam. Profit-loss sharing system is risky for the bank as they don't know if they could trust the borrower either in the information they provide about their financial situation or their capabilities in executing the venture leading to lack of use. Financing is thus co-opted by inevitable market mechanisms such as interest as new method of financing was put in use that pertains to traditional capitalism. During its nascent phase the Islamic banking sought consultancy from Westerns bankers who co-opted the banking system to adopt hegemonic systems such as LIBOR and the creation of AAOIFI that is in line with International Financial Reporting Standards.

Entrepreneurialism in scarce capital countries have taken advantage of rotating savings and credit associations where each member contributes an agreed sum of money at recurring intervals that is directed to a single person in total during their turn. Such association would consist of entrepreneurs of all levels with differing contributions with respect to individual business profit. In comparison to bank loans credit associations are more accessible as banks might require existing capital against a loan. Historically credit associations have been small in participants, its members constituting from a communal setting - implying trust between the group - initial target of credit associations is ambivalent as there is evidence for growth, charity and festive occasion based ambitions. However the associations have become more professional with grand entrepreneurial ambitions gaining members outside the inner circle having to rely on lawyers to maintain order of the complex rules while being independent organisations without institutional intervention.

=== Limitations on use ===
If a group is elected or appointed based on its members representing specific constituencies, co-option to fill vacancies is inappropriate, as a member selected by existing members will not necessarily represent the interests of the group represented by the vacating member. In this case, vacancies may be filled via a mechanism specified in its rules, such as a by-election. Examples are:

- geographical constituencies (as used in legislatures in the United States and United Kingdom)
- constituencies of adherents to a political party, known as proportional representation (as used in legislatures in Israel and New Zealand)
- ethnic groups (as used in Māori constituencies in the New Zealand legislature)
- any other affinity group.

=== Nomenclature ===
Sociologist Philip Selznick, in the context of the Tennessee Valley Authority (TVA), described this form as "formal cooptation".

== Second sense ==
This is arguably a derivation from the first sense. The outcome of such co-option will be specific to the individual case, and will depend on the relative strength of the co-opting and co-opted groups, the degree of alignment of their interests, and the vigour with which their members are prepared to pursue those interests. For example, when corporations greenwash their brands by co-opting the tone of environmentalism without any deep reform of their environmental impact, both environmental advocates and the general public must decide how to engage (or not) with the greenwashed result (accept it wholly, boycott it, apply pressure from another angle, ignore it, or some other path).

Selznick, again in the context of the Tennessee Valley Authority, described this form as "informal co-optation", although the process he describes is almost indistinguishable from the corrupt sale of political influence.

=== Brewing beer ===
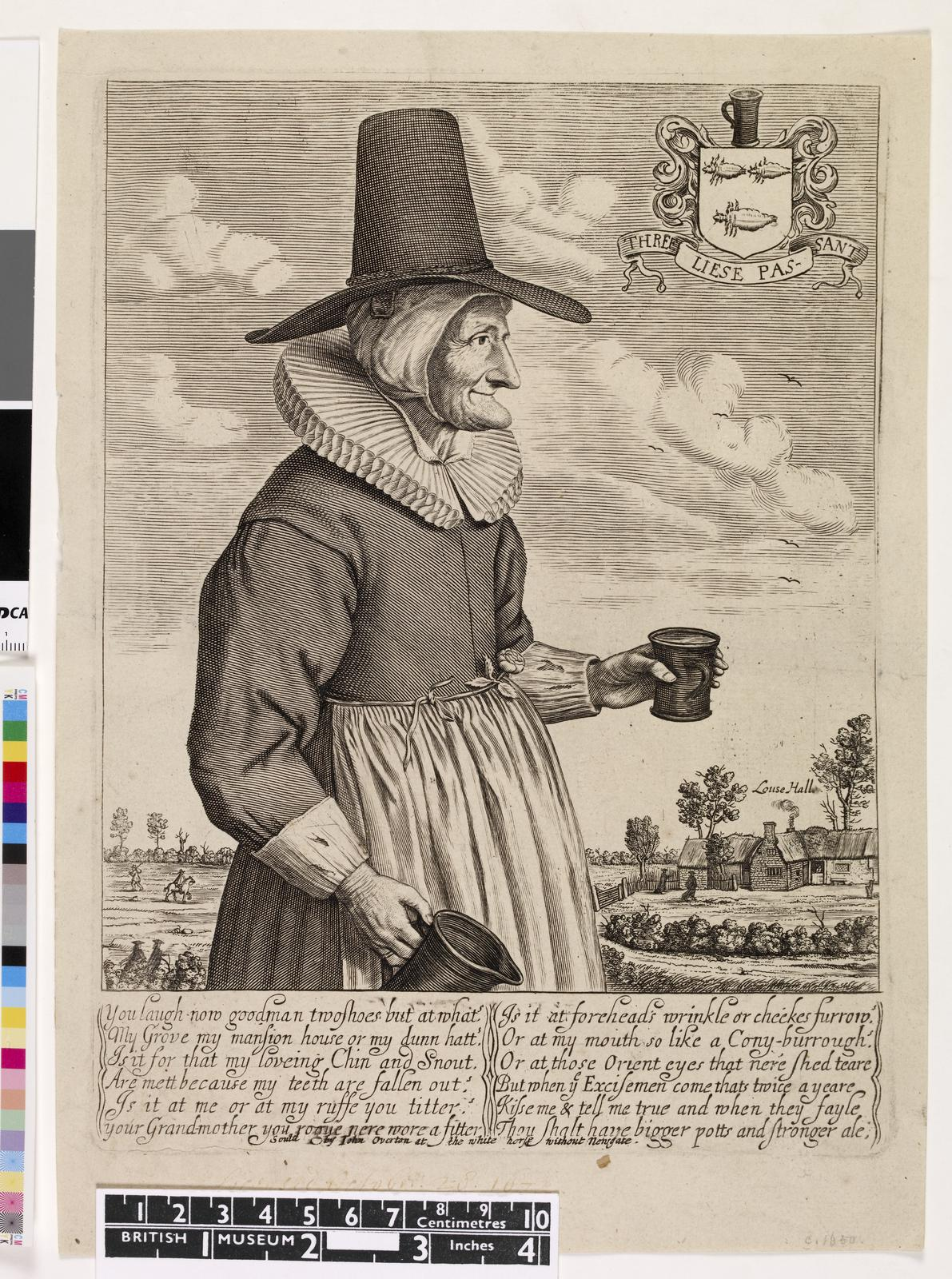
Mother Louse was a famous alewife who is seen wearing a pointy hat that was believed to demarcate her in the marketplace as a brewer.

Alewives were women who brewed ale during the middle ages in England primarily for domestic use as it was cheap, nutritious, and easy to make. However excess ales could be sold to gain additional income, still it was not the main profession of most alewives as they were married and subject to their husbands. In the 1330s, King Edward III enacted a law that subsumed alewives trade as their husbands liabilities, meaning that husbands were responsible for any quality deviation in their wife's ales, leaving the trade for single women. During 1400's alcoholic beverages were becoming transgressive in causing unrest and alewives were the persons to be blamed. Later women were excluded and banned from the trade. Solitary women who were making their own living and not reproducing and were seen as counter-hegemonic as they were not pertaining to traditional values. Also the incipient trade was becoming more valuable as women had the majority of the market share. Men began to expropriate the trade by portraying alewives as witches with the help of woodcuts, prints, and poems in the 1500's. It had a co-opting effect as now men were becoming predominantly in charge of the trade and women were seen as worshipping the devil by brewing regressive ale. Brewing thus became more professional in comparison to home-made production for domestic use.

== See also ==
- Entryism
- Recuperation (politics)
- Interventions of political parties in Venezuela
- Co-optation strategy of the Chinese Communist Party
