= Jewish Life =

The term Jewish life typically refers to the practicing of Judaism (Jewish religion) and/or Jewish culture.

Jewish Life may refer to:

- Jewish Currents (Jewish Life until 1956), magazine founded in 1946
- Jewish Life Television, TV network founded in 2007
- Steinhardt Foundation for Jewish Life (originally Jewish Life Network), American education foundation founded in 1994
