= Kingsdale Shopping Center =

- Location: Upper Arlington, Ohio
- Coordinates: 40°01′14″N 83°03′33″W
- Opened: 1959
- Num. of anchor tenants: 2 (1 open, 1 vacant)
- Floor area: 38 acres (15 ha)
- Floors: 1 (2 in former Macy's)
- Public transit: COTA
- Website: www.facebook.com/KingsdaleUA/

Kingsdale Shopping Center, also known as Kingsdale, Kingsdale Center, and Kingsdale Mall, is a large, mixed-use shopping center in Upper Arlington, Ohio, a suburb of Columbus. It features a Giant Eagle Market District supermarket.

Built in 1959, the shopping center covers 38 acres between Tremont Road and Northwest Boulevard. It is the location where Les Wexner opened his first Limited store. It once fell into disrepair, but has since been completely remodeled and now serves as a popular gathering place for the city's residents.

== History ==
=== Early years ===
The center was built in 1959 on what was once the Galbraith farm between Tremont Road and Northwest Boulevard in Upper Arlington, a suburban city founded in 1918. In 1963, Les Wexner borrowed $5,000 from his aunt to open the first Limited store – the first of what is now a billion-dollar retailing empire, L Brands. Department store Lazarus, one of the founding components of the Federated Department Stores chain, opened a branch at the mall in 1970. It started out as an 85,000 sq. ft. building and was enlarged to 108,000 sq. ft. in 1977.

The Kingsdale Co. purchased the center in 1977 and completed a $4 million remodeling project in 1982. In its early days, Kingsdale attracted high-income shoppers from the suburb to anchor stores Lazarus and The Union. Other tenants included Madison's, an Ohio-based women's clothing store, and an S. S. Kresge Corporation dime store.

=== 1990s ===
Sales were waning in the late 1980s. The owners wanted to renovate the property, but their lender, Boston Real Estate, did not approve of the plan. Kingsdale Co. withheld payments during the dispute, eventually filing for Chapter 11 bankruptcy protection in November 1990. In 1991, about 20 percent of the retail space was vacant and at one time during the decade, only 55 percent of the center was occupied.

Plans for remodeling began again after the center was given to Boston Real Estate Counsel Inc. in 1992 and Kravco Co. became the managing agent. A 64-foot clock tower was built in 1993 and Stein Mart become a large part of the center in 1994. The center gained 11 stores between 1992 and 1994, seven of which opened in 1994, including Stein Mart. It was the third Stein Mart opened in Ohio and the first in the Columbus, Ohio, area.

In 1997, The Mall at Tuttle Crossing opened, and Regency Realty Corp. bought the property from their partners in 1998. Regency was the largest owner of grocery store-anchored shopping centers in the country at the time.

A portion of the Kingsdale lot has been used as a park and ride for the Central Ohio Transit Authority, which closed once in September 1999 to make room for center renovations.

=== 2000s to present ===
In 2000, the center's vacancy rate ranged from 25-30 percent. There were several proposals about what to do with the complex including building a five-story community center, building office spaces and parking garages, as well as tearing down the retail spaces and building streets through the area.

In 2001, a deal fell through with Continental Real Estate, a successful local developer, to buy and redevelop two-thirds of the property. This led to the city wanting to purchase 14 acres of the center to build a $27-million community center that would have had swimming pools, a gym, running track, fitness area, community hall, senior-citizens center, meeting rooms, and a kitchen, but the levy did not pass due to opposition by organizations such as Citizens for Common Sense who felt that residents should not have to pay taxes for services they might not use and some residents believed the area was too valuable as a commercial site to develop it as a community center. Upper Arlington also lacked sidewalks, making it dangerous for residents to walk there. Despite the overwhelming rejection to the tax levy, the city continued with plans to develop a "town center". This caused some residents to seek to recall the city council members who unanimously voted to buy the 14 acres prior to putting the community center levy on the ballot. A few months later, in January 2003, the mayor resigned and the city backed out of the deal.

With more than half of the storefronts empty, Regency Centers gave up on finding buyers to make it what the city had envisioned in their master plan. Large tenants Stein Mart and Barron's China and Gifts left later that year. Regency Centers proposed a $1.5-million façade upgrade after Giant Eagle bought the bankrupt Big Bear store in 2004.

In May 2004, the owners asked the city to lower its tax value by $3.3 million. They claimed the center remained mostly vacant due to zoning restrictions that requires to have a mixed-use center rather than the retail-only center for which the owner has been seeking tenants. However, the owners also raised the rent charged their tenants, which impeded sales. This backfired when the Franklin County Board of Revisions actually raised the center's tax value by $5 million, retroactive to 2002.

In 2005, developers Long & Wilcox and Wears Khan McMenamy started buying up houses near the center and built multi-family condominiums called Town Center Place. City Council lowered zoning restrictions on big-box retailers in September 2007, but turned down Regency's proposed Target store.

In 2007, Federated Department Stores became Macy's Group Inc. and rebranded all of the Lazarus stores, including the Kingsdale location, as Macy's.

Although the 2001 deal fell through, Continental Real Estate, developers of Lennox Town Center and parts of Easton and the Arena District, purchased Kingsdale in late 2009. Ohio's first Giant Eagle "Market District" was built a year later. The 110,168 square-feet store was built just south of the original store in place of the old Stein Mart building. It features a cafe, wine and beer store, exotic foods, an on-site dietitian, beauty specialist, cooking classes, and more.

Designation in 2009 as an "entertainment district" allowed liquor licenses to be issued, continuing the center's growth and spurring interest by more tenants. The center now has restaurants, bars, banks, an urgent care facility, hardware store, sporting goods store, video game store, pet supply store, Goodwill, a Giant Eagle Market District, and more.

In January 2015, Macy's announced that the company was closing three Ohio stores, including the Kingsdale location, by the end of March. The store closed in late March 2015, and the space was sold to Kroger. Kroger ultimately sold the property to Continental Real Estate, which plans to develop a multi-use project on the site. Despite efforts by local preservationists, including the Columbus Landmarks Foundation, to save the building that formerly contained the Lazarus/Macy's store with its blue-glazed brick façade and to see it repurposed, it was demolished in June 2021 to make way for the project.

== Gallery ==
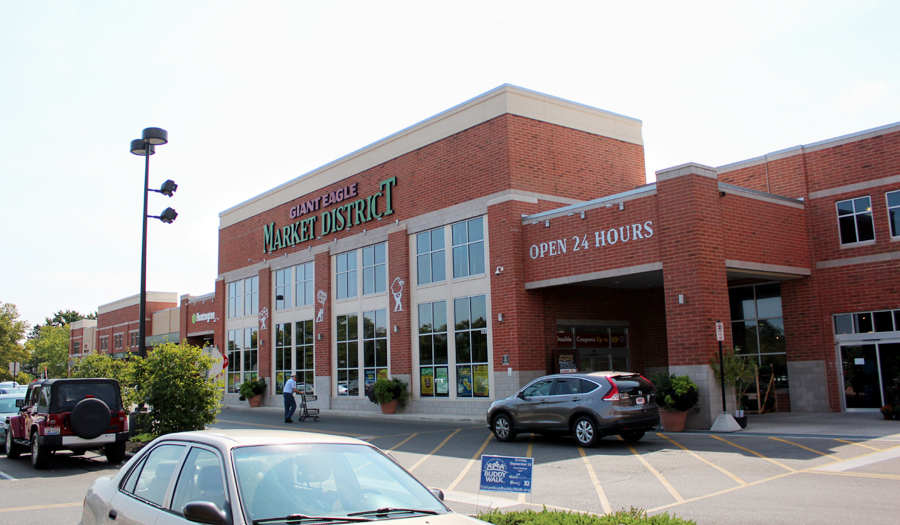
Giant Eagle Market District

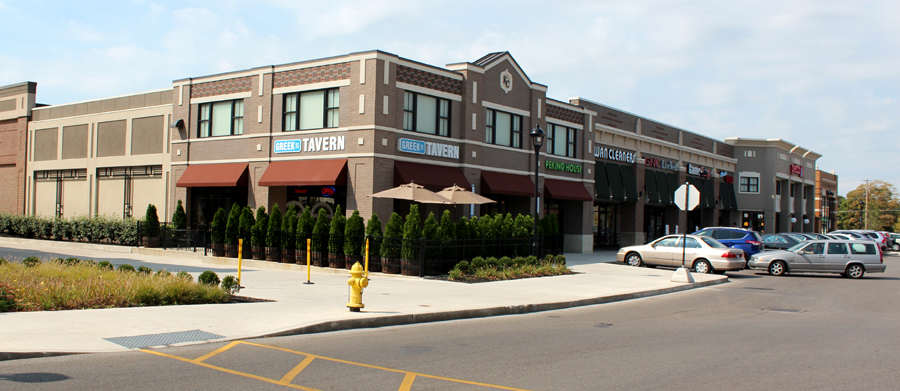
One of the Buildings at the shopping center

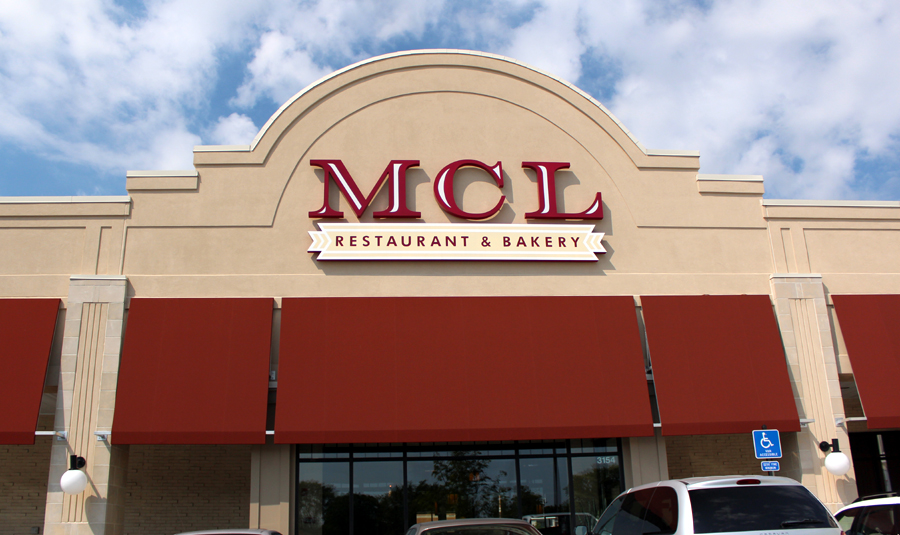
MCL Cafeteria

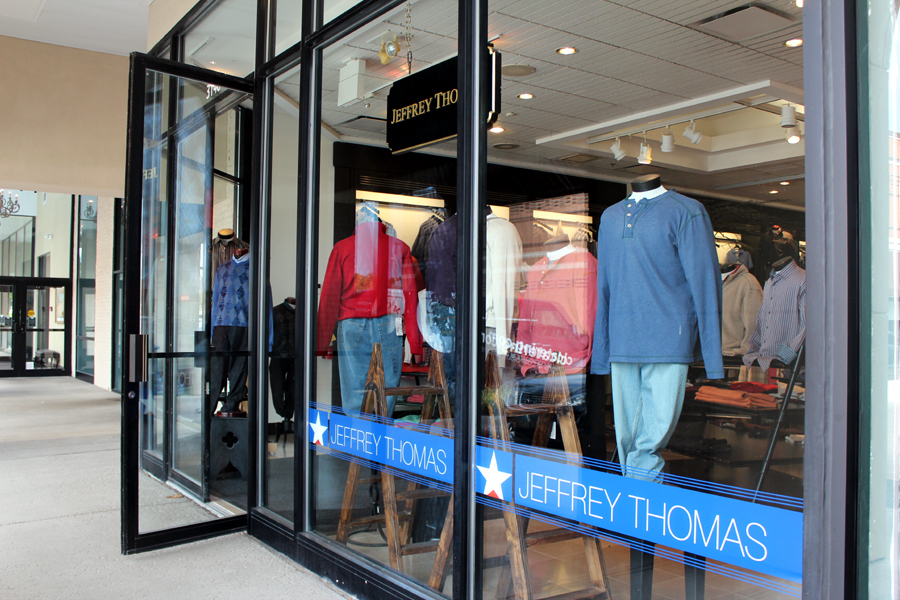
Jeffrey Thomas clothing store

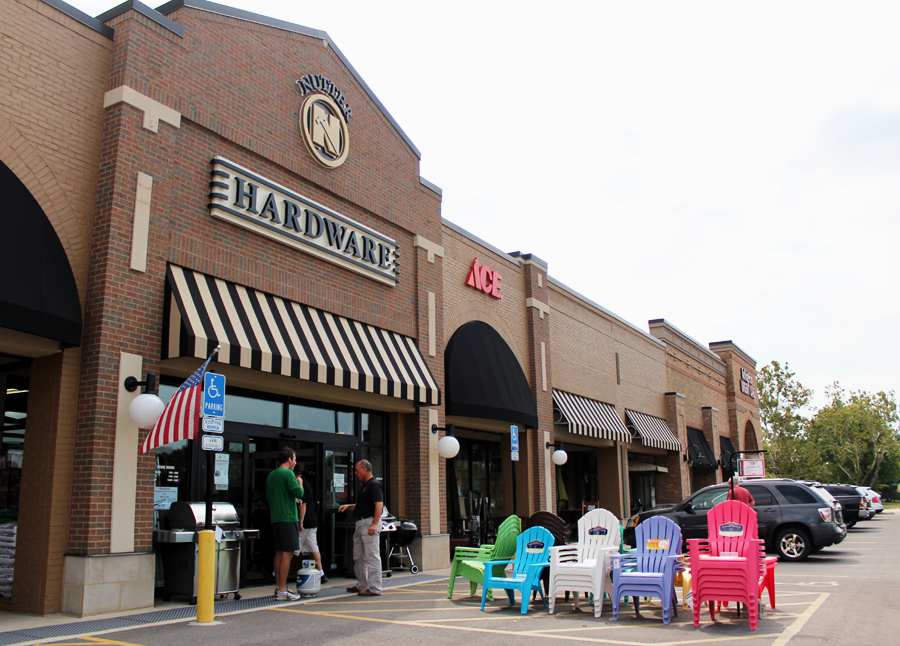
Nutter hardware store

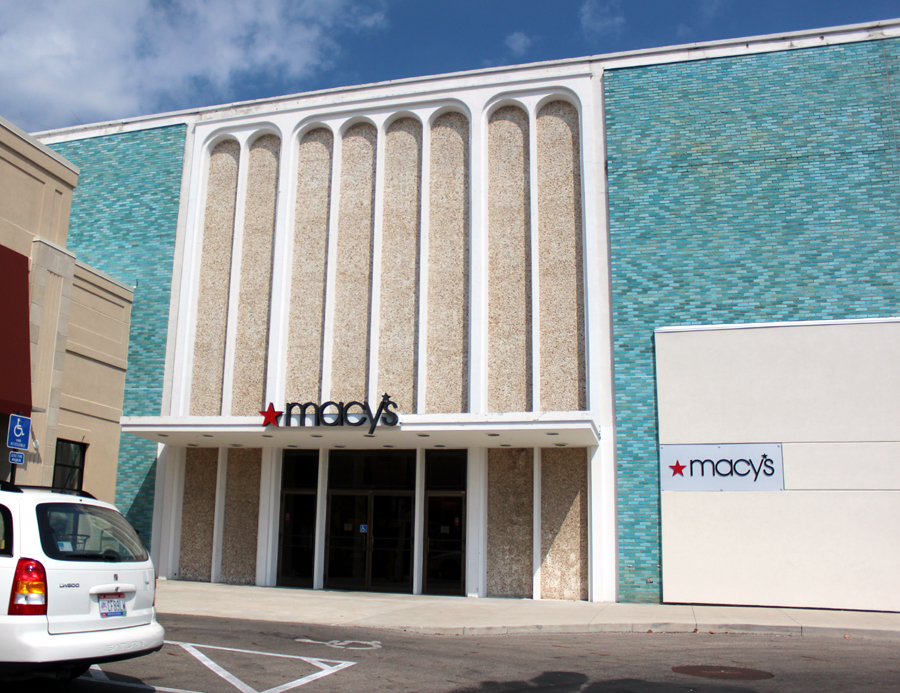
Macy's store (closed in March 2015); originally Lazarus
