= Sara Berman (philanthropist) =

American philanthropist and journalist

Sara Berman Bloom is an American philanthropist and journalist who has also been a director of Jewish organizations.

== Early life, family and education ==
Berman was born on the Upper East Side of Manhattan, New York City. She is the daughter of hedge fund manager Michael Steinhardt.

== Career ==
Bloom has been an editor at The Forward and was the parenting columnist for the New York Sun newspaper. She is a trustee of the Steinhardt Foundation for Jewish Life.

Sara Berman is a founder and the board chair of Hebrew Public, a national network of US-based Hebrew-English dual-language charter schools. She is also the vice chairwoman of the board of The Steinhardt Foundation for Jewish Life and serves on the boards of the Areivim Philanthropic Group, OneTable: The Shabbat Project, and the National Alliance for Public Charter Schools.

== Personal life ==
Berman is married to Mark Bloom and has six children from her first marriage.
