= Steinhardt (surname) =

Steinhardt is a surname of German origin. Notable people with the surname include:

- Adam Steinhardt (1969–2025), Australian pole vaulter
- Arnold Steinhardt (born 1937), American concert violinist
- Géza Steinhardt (1873–1944), Hungarian actor
- Jacob Steinhardt (1887–1968), German painter and woodcut artist
- Joseph Steinhardt (1720–1776), German rabbi and Talmud scholar
- Laurence Steinhardt (1892–1950), American diplomat; U.S. ambassador to several countries, including the USSR
- Michael Steinhardt (born 1941), American financial manager and philanthropist
- Nicolae Steinhardt (1912–1989), Romanian writer, Orthodox Christian hermit and father confessor
- Paul Steinhardt (born 1952), American theoretical physicist and professor
- Robby Steinhardt (1950–2021), American rock musician and singer
