= New York & Company =

American women's clothing retailer

- Formerly: Lerner Shops (1918–1992); Lerner New York (1992–2004)
- Industry: Retail
- Founded: 1918; 108 years ago
- Founders: Samuel A. Lerner; Joseph J. Lerner; Michael Lerner; Harold M. Lane
- Headquarters: 1 W 34th Street, New York (2023)
- Key people: Mark Stocker (President, 2023)
- Products: Women's Apparel & Accessories
- Parent: ADJHA NY&Co. LLC
- Website: nyandcompany.com

New York & Company, Inc. (NY&C) is an American e-commerce workwear retailer for women. Their apparel and accessories are sold exclusively through their digital store.

After being known as Lerner Shops until 1992, its name was changed to Lerner New York and then New York & Company. The company began retailing exclusively through its digital store in 2020.

== Company history ==
=== Lerner Shops ===
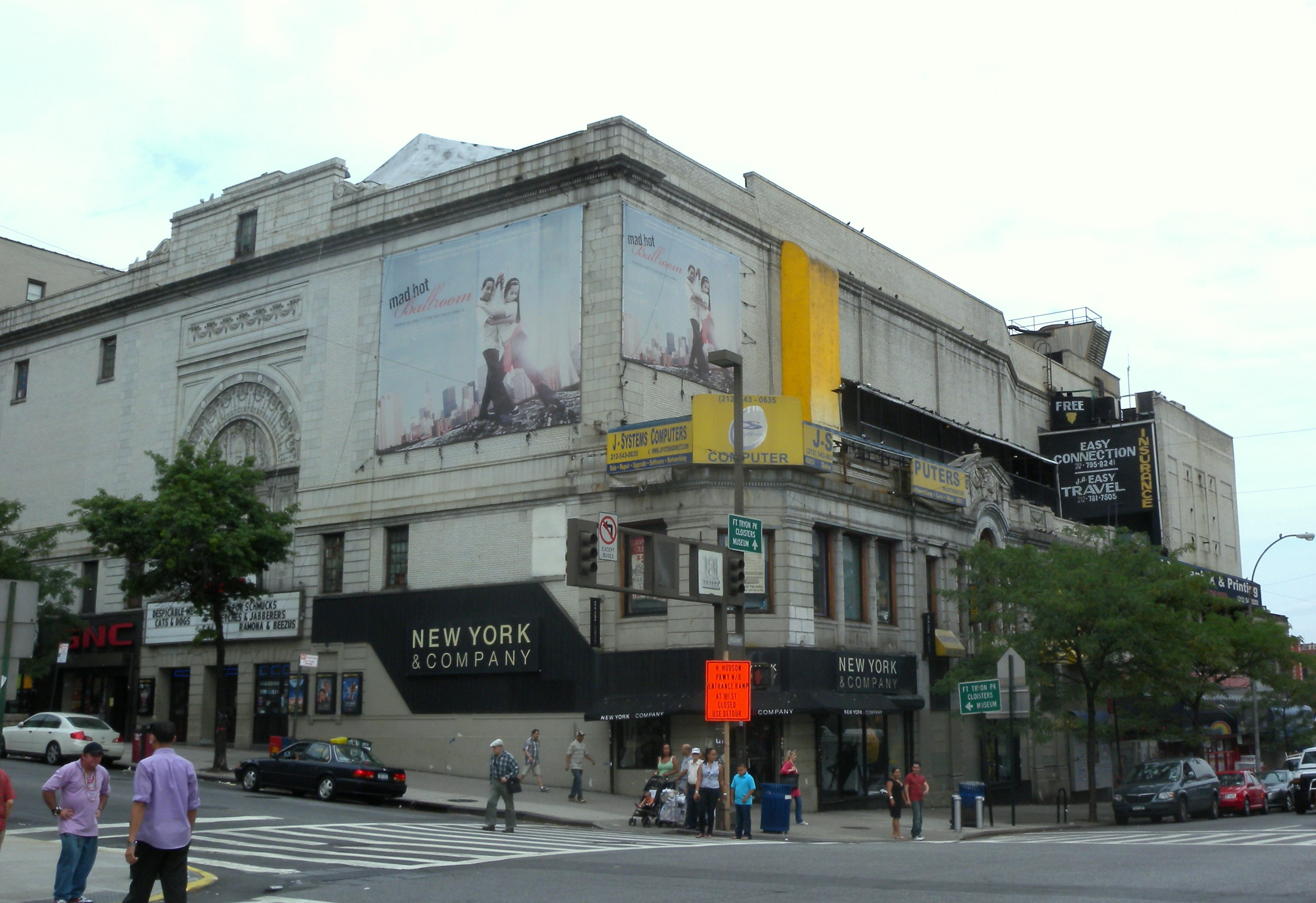
Broadway, Washington Heights, Manhattan

The company started as Lorraine Shops in 1917. Lerner Shops was founded in 1918 by brothers Samuel A. Lerner, Joseph J. Lerner, Michael Lerner, and Harold M. Lane in New York City. Joseph was the father of lyricist Alan Jay Lerner.

The first Lerner Shops store was in New York City; 18 more shops opened later that year. After being reorganized as Lerner Stores Corporation, 23 stores were in operation in 1920. Within ten years, that figure grew to 160 units in 37 states; in 1948, it was said to have just under 200 stores nationwide.

In 1963, McCrory Corporation acquired a significant share in the company. Lerner was the country's largest chain of women's and children's apparel shops by 1965. McCrory came to acquire 60% of Lerner, officially buying the company in 1973.

In August 1981, after being said to have 470 retail locations, it already had 717 stores and sales of $686 million. Lerner was operating nearly 800 stores with $700 million in annual sales by 1985.

In February 1985, Limited Brands announced it would buy Lerner from McCrory's parent company, the Rapid-American Corporation, for $260 million. Many of the top executives of Lerner were dismissed and Leslie Wexner, chairman and chief executive of The Limited, assumed the posts of chairman and chief executive for the brand. Wexner then cancelled up to $100 million in orders that had been made under the previous management.

=== New York & Company ===
Lerner Shops became known as Lerner New York in the early 1990s. By 1993, The Limited Inc. found that many of its brands were competing against each other. The company announced it would close 100 of its more than 900 Lerner New York locations. It then modernized its line of clothing and introduced the New York & Company label. By the end of the decade, it had dropped the Lerner name and became New York & Company.

In 2002, Limited Brands sold New York & Company to Bear Stearns Merchant Banking, making it an independent company. It went public in 2004 and opened a new flagship store New York City at 58th Street and Lexington Avenue. The company launched an ecommerce website in 2006.

In 2012, the company launched NY&C Beauty, a beauty line including fragrance, lip, and nail products. In 2013, the company launched an exclusive collection designed in collaboration with actress Eva Mendes.

The company began pushing into the outlet space during the 2010s. By the end of 2015, 82 of 490 stores were outlet stores. Another 50 were slated for conversion in the first quarter of 2016, with a fourth of the company's stores expected to by outlets by the end of the year. In 2016, CEO Gregory Scott and New York & Comp ny were an episode of Undercover Boss.

By 2017, New York & Company had 466 retail stores in the U.S. after closing 11 flagship stores and six other stores at the end of the previous year. Gabrielle Union launched her own collection in 2017. In November, the company announced it had acquired plus-size retailer Fashion to Figure for $1.4 million.

In August 2018, the company opened its largest flagship store to date, an 18,000-sq.-ft, two-level store on State Street in Downtown Chicago. That month, Kate Hudson became an ambassador to the Soho Jeans line and would gain her own collection with New York & Company.

=== RTW Retailwinds, bankruptcy, and sale ===
In September 2018, New York & Co., Inc. rebranded as RTW Retailwinds in an effort to expand its portfolio and focus on ecommerce. The new name took effect in November, with the company changing its ticker symbol to RTW on the New York Stock Exchange. In 2019, Hudson's Happy X Nature collection launched. It debuted the Uncommon Sense lingerie brand in April, but by August, announced it would exit the business. At the end of the year, RTW posted an operating loss of nearly $62 million and announced it would close 30 stores (including 19 NY&C locations).

After a disappointing holiday season, RTW received warning from the New York Stock Exchange in January 2020 that its stock was in danger of being delisted. In February 2020, S&P Global Market Intelligence named RTW its second most vulnerable retailer, meaning it was in danger of defaulting. The company planned to close more stores and focus on ecommerce, but the COVID-19 pandemic proved financially devastating to the business. In March 2020, the company named a new CEO, then all stores were closed and nearly all sales associates were furloughed. However, the CEO and four board members resigned just weeks later. In May, 190 corporate and 13 district managers were permanently terminated.

RTW filed for bankruptcy in July 2020, with plans to close most, if not all, physical locations. In August, the company agreed to sell its assets, including New York & Company, Fashion to Figure, and its rental subscription business, to Sunrise Brands LLC $20 million. RTW ultimately sold to Saadia Group in September, following a bankruptcy auction.

In August 2021, New York & Company, under Saadia Group, introduced its first menswear collection. Gabrielle Union relaunched her fashion line in September, releasing it for NY&C, Lord & Taylor, and Fashion to Figure.

However, by March 1, 2024, Saadia Group had effectively shut down after defaulting on a $45 million loan. Its creditor, White Oak Commercial Finance, was granted control over the company's assets. New York & Company is now controlled by ADJHA NY&Co. LLC.

== Celebrity advertisements ==
Celebrities who have appeared in advertisements for New York & Company include Eva Longoria, Brooke Shields, Iman, Cindy Crawford, Jennifer Hudson, Maria Menounos, Ellen Pompeo, Patrick Dempsey, Eva Mendes, Gabrielle Union, and Kate Hudson.
