= Bath & Body Works, Inc. =

American retail company

- Type: Public
- Traded as: NYSE: BBWI; S&P 400 component
- Industry: Retail
- Founded: 1963; 63 years ago
- Founder: Les Wexner
- Headquarters: Columbus, Ohio, U.S.
- Key people: Daniel Heaf (CEO)
- Products: Clothing, fashion accessory
- Revenue: ▼US$7.29 billion (2025)
- Net income: ▼US$649 million (2025)
- Number of employees: 59,210 (2024)
- Subsidiaries: Bath & Body Works
- Website: www.bathandbodyworks.com

Bath & Body Works, Inc. (formerly known as L Brands, Inc., Limited Brands, Inc. and The Limited, Inc.) is an American specialty retail company based in Columbus, Ohio. It owns Bath & Body Works, posted $7.4 billion in revenue in 2023, and was listed as 481 on the 2024 Fortune 500 list of largest United States companies by revenue.

In February 2020, L Brands announced the planned sale of its Victoria's Secret division to Sycamore Partners, a private equity firm. Under the agreement, Sycamore Partners would gain a 55% controlling stake in Victoria's Secret while L Brands would keep a 45% stake, leaving Bath & Body Works to become L Brand's sole business. The sale fell through in May 2020, although CEO Les Wexner did step down as planned, and was succeeded by Andrew Meslow. Daniel Heaf was appointed the new CEO effective May 19, 2025, replacing Gina Boswell who stepped down in May 2025.

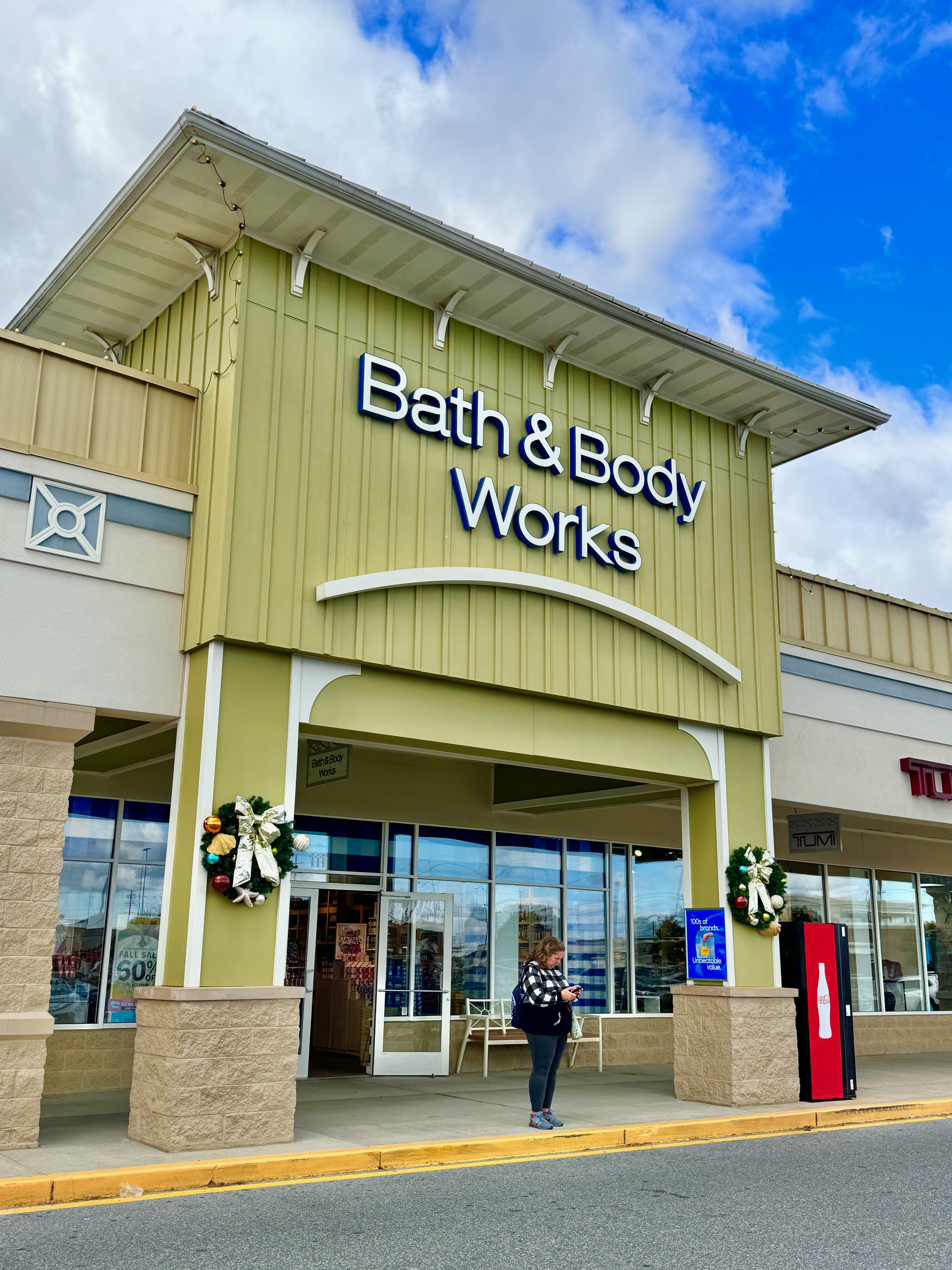
A Bath & Body Works store in Rehoboth Beach, Delaware

In March 2021, L Brands announced it would spin off Victoria's Secret as a stand-alone publicly traded company, and then change its name to Bath & Body Works, Inc. As of August 3, 2021, the separation was complete, and Bath and Body Works stock started trading under the ticker symbol "BBWI".

== History ==
=== Origins ===
Bella Cabakoff was born in Williamsburg, Brooklyn and moved to Columbus as a toddler. At age 21, she became the youngest buyer for the Lazarus department store chain. After spending over 20 years working for Lazarus, in 1951, she and her husband Harry Wexner opened a women's clothing store named Leslie's on State Street. The store was named after their son, Leslie "Les" Wexner, and he began working there when he was attending college at Ohio State University.

In 1963, Wexner borrowed $5,000 from his aunt and $5,000 from the bank and opened a store at the Kingsdale Shopping Center in Upper Arlington, Ohio. This store was named "The Limited" because the store focused on clothing for younger women, unlike his parents' general merchandise store. Later, in 1964, Bella and Harry closed their store to join their son in his venture.

=== 1970s–present ===
The original board consisted of only the three family members and longtime friend Jim Waldron, who served as Senior Vice President. Bella Wexner served as secretary until her death in 2001, Harry as chairman (he served until his death in 1975), and Leslie, CEO from inception, later succeeded his father as the chairman. As of 2014, he and his family continued to own 17% of LB. In 1969, Wexner took The Limited Brands public and sold 47,600 shares at $7.25 a share. In 1977, The Limited moved into its main headquarters on Morse Road in Columbus, from which L Brands still operates today. In 1982, The Limited was first listed on the New York Stock Exchange.

L Brands shareholders filed a complaint in the Court of Chancery of Delaware on January 14, 2021, stating that former chair Wexner, among others, created an "entrenched culture of misogyny, bullying and harassment" and was aware of abuses being committed by accused sex trafficker Jeffrey Epstein, which breached his fiduciary duty to the company, causing devaluation of the brand. The complaint also names Wexner's wife, Abigail, current chair Sarah E. Nash, and former marketing officer Ed Razek, whose "widely known misconduct" was long allowed at the company.

In February 2021, L Brands announced the retirement of CFO Stuart Burgdoerfer in August of that year, to be replaced by CEO of Victoria's Secret Martin Waters. Mr. Burgdoerfer stated he was "grateful to have had the opportunity to work with extraordinary people in every part of the business."

In December 2021, a candle factory owned and operated by Mayfield Consumer Products was destroyed by a tornado. Several employees died and dozens were trapped because supervisors did not allow employees to leave in preparation for the weather. This factory was a major supplier of Bath & Body Works scented candles.

In 2023, Bath and Body Works announced that its whole production system had relocated to the outskirts of Columbus, Ohio. Ten of the company's suppliers agreed to make the move to the United States, adding 5,000 employees and increasing annual revenue by $2 billion. The company said the decision to move production to the United States was a result of frustration over shipping delays which required 3 months lead time, rather than just 21 days when produced in Ohio.

=== Acquisitions ===
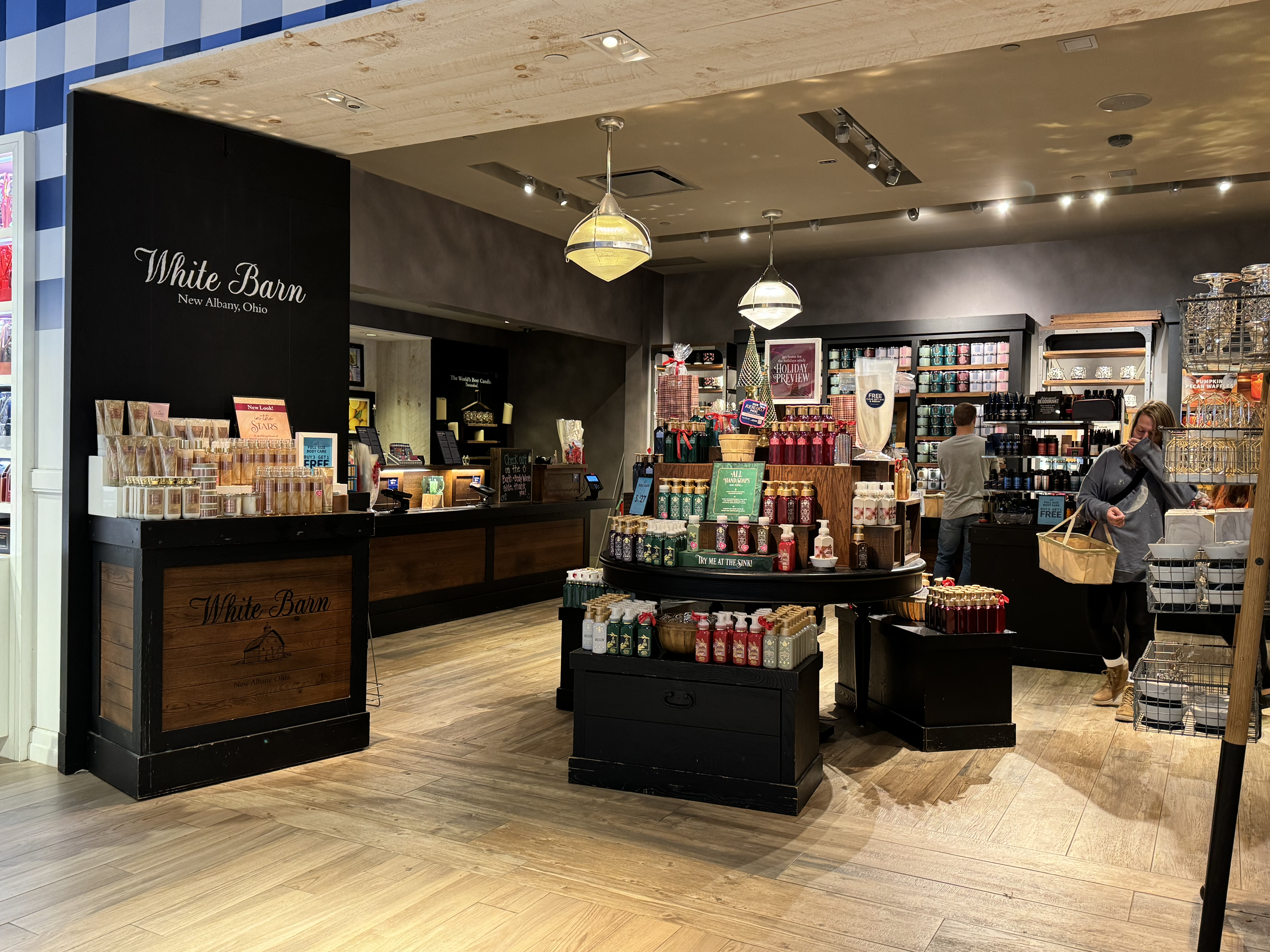
A White Barn store at Greenwood Park Mall in Greenwood, Indiana in 2023.

The 1980s started a string of acquisitions. In 1982, the Victoria's Secret brand, store, and catalogue were purchased from Roy Raymond for $1 million. Also in 1982, 207 Lane Bryant stores were purchased. In 1985, the exclusive Henri Bendel store on Fifth Avenue in New York City was purchased for $10 million and 798 Lerner stores for $297 million. Finally, in 1988, 25 Abercrombie & Fitch stores were purchased for $46 million. In 1996, The Limited ended its ownership of the A&F brand; it was spun off into a publicly traded company.

The 1990s saw initial development of the Limited Too, Bath & Body Works, Structure, and Victoria's Secret Beauty. In 1998, several Bath & Body Works stores were converted to The White Barn Candle Company stores to begin a home fragrance brand.

In 2005, Limited Brands purchased home fragrance manufacturer Slatkin & Company.

=== Divestitures ===
On August 3, 2007, Limited Brands sold 75% ownership of its flagship The Limited chain to buyout firm Sun Capital Partners, Inc. In 2010, the remaining 25% of shares were also purchased by Sun Capital. Stefan M. Selig from Bank of America was involved in these deals. Following the sale of their namesake store, Limited Brands changed their company name to L Brands, as per the terms of the sale. On January 7, 2017, The Limited closed all of its stores in the United States. The web retail operation, thelimited.com, was initially continued for business and shipping nationwide. Despite this, The Limited online soon filed for bankruptcy and discontinued all services. However, the brand was revived in mid-2017 by Sycamore Partners subsidiary Belk and Limited-branded merchandise became available on its website.

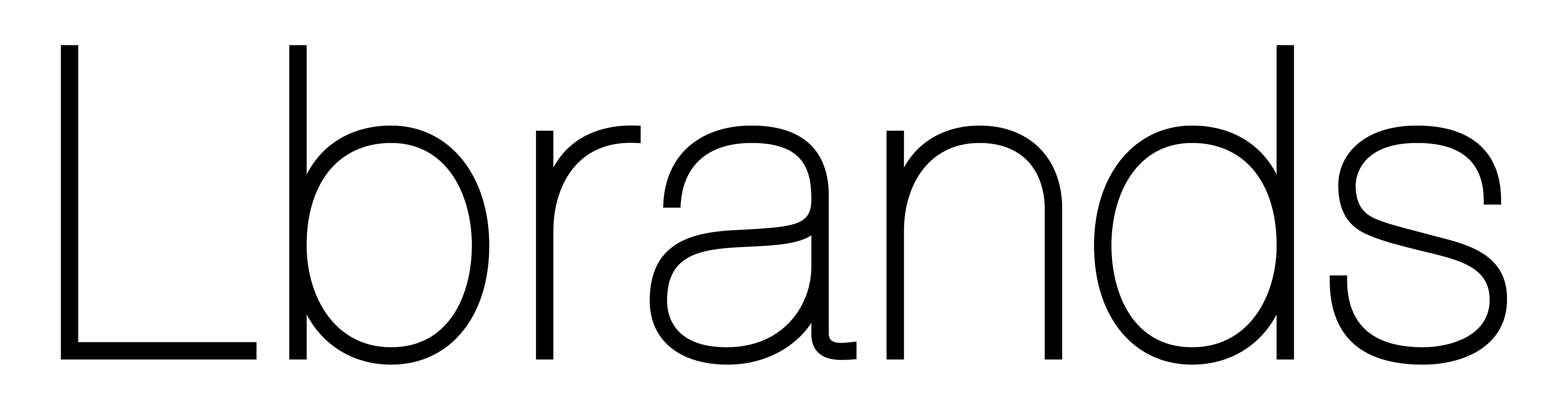
The former L Brands logo

On February 20, 2020, L Brands announced that it would sell its Victoria's Secret division to Sycamore Partners, private equity firm. Under the agreement, Sycamore Partners would gain a 55% controlling stake in Victoria's Secret for about $525 million. L Brands would keep a 45% stake, leaving Bath & Body Works to potentially become L Brand's sole business. L Brands also announced that CEO Leslie Wexner was stepping down. On May 4, 2020, L Brands and Sycamore Partners announced a "mutual termination" of their deal, and settlement of related litigation.

At the May 14, 2020, virtual shareholders meeting, L Brands founder, CEO and board chair Les Wexner stepped down. Bath & Body Works CEO Andrew Meslow moved up to become CEO of L Brands and joined the board, and three directors stepped down. The company announced it would go forward with a spin-off of Victoria's Secret as a stand-alone company. It also announced it would close 250 Victoria's Secret Stores and 50 Bath and Body Works stores.

On September 14, 2020, L Brands announced that it would sell its majority stake in its Victoria's Secret UK business to Next Plc under a newly formed joint venture. The financial terms of the agreement were not disclosed.

In 2021, L Brands announced Victoria's Secret and Bath & Body Works would be divided into two separate publicly traded companies, with current L Brands CEO Andrew Meslow as the head of Bath & Body Works and Martin Waters as the head of Victoria's Secret. The split into Victoria's Secret and Bath & Body Works went into effect August 2, 2021, and the companies began trading individually on the New York Stock Exchange Tuesday morning. L Brands decided in May to move ahead with a split after initially deciding to sell a 55% stake in Victoria's Secret for $500 million in February 2020. That deal was called off because of the pandemic. The name L Brands is no longer used as the name changed to Bath & Body Works Inc.

== Brands ==
=== Current brands ===
L Brands operates the following retail brands:

- Bath & Body Works - L Brands changed its name to Bath & Body Works Inc.

=== Former brands ===
Previous brands that were spun off include:

- Lane Bryant – sold in 2001 to Charming Shoppes
- Abercrombie & Fitch – acquired by The Limited in 1988 and went public as NYSE: ANF in 1996
- Lerner New York – sold and became New York and Company
- The Limited Too – spun off in 1999 and re-branded as Justice
- Galyan's T– merged with Victoria's Secret Beauty
- Express – on May 15, 2007, Limited Brands sold a 75% stake in Express to Golden Gate Capital Partners
- The Limited – on August 3, 2007, Limited Brands transferred 75% ownership of its flagship The Limited chain to buyout firm Sun Capital Partners Inc.; in 2010, Sun Capital purchased the remaining shares.
- La Senza - sold to Regent in January 2019
- Victoria's Secret- on August 3, 2021, The Columbus-based retailer officially split into its own company
- Pink - on August 3, 2021, the company split into its own company under Victoria's Secret

Brands that ceased operations:

- Henri Bendel (closed in January 2019)
