= Edward Razek =

American businessman

Ed Razek
- Born: April 24, 1948 (age 78)
- Education: Ohio State University
- Occupation: Businessperson
- Years active: 1983–2019
- Known for: Marketing lingerie Victoria's Secret Fashion Show

Edward G. Razek (born April 24, 1948) is an American businessman who was the chief marketing officer for L Brands where he developed the Victoria's Secret Angels and the company's annual fashion show. Razek joined L Brands in 1983 and resigned in 2019 after persistent public criticism for creating a culture of misogyny and harassment.

== Early life ==
Ed Razek grew up in Cleveland, Ohio, and was raised by his father a Syrian immigrant, who worked as a steel mill worker. He attended the Culver Military Academy in Indiana starting at age 12. Razek earned a degree in English at Ohio State University in the late 1960s.

== Career ==
Razek worked in advertising for several years at Shelly Berman Communicators (SBC Advertising, Inc.) in Columbus, Ohio. He was a partner with Shelly Berman and Bill Wickham at the agency. Among his early clients at Shelly Berman Communicators was the clothing retailer Les Wexner of The Limited, Inc. (later known as L Brands). In 1983, Razek left SBC and joined in-house branding operations at the Limited.

In 1994, Wexner tasked Razek with developing a fashion show for one of the companies brands. The first fashion show took place in 1995 with the chosen brand, Victoria's Secret. A somewhat modest affair for a risqué product at first, the fashion show, under Razek, transformed into a spectacle and became an entertainment event, with peak viewership in 2001.

Razek was instrumental in selecting the brand's models, known as "Angels" and given angel wings, and creating the company's TV ads.

It later emerged that Razek was the subject of repeated complaints to the human resources department regarding inappropriate behaviour, but he continued to operate with impunity for many years.

A 2004 interview with the Columbus Monthly magazine notes his comments: “We've got beautiful women in lingerie. That's right,” he says unapologetically. “We're not a potato chip company.”

Following a November 2018 interview with Vogue, Razek received strong and sustained criticism for his marketing after he expressed an aversion to casting transgender and plus-sized models in the Victoria's Secret Fashion Show. In an era of MeToo and body positivity the backlash was severe, with calls for Razek to step down.

Victoria's Secret was also bowing under the weight of Wexner's connection to Jeffrey Epstein, following his arrest in July 2019 on charges of sex trafficking. It emerged that Epstein used his connections to Wexner and Victoria's Secret to prey on young women by posing as a recruiter. Executives had warned Wexner about this in the 1990s, but no action was taken. The business problems at Victoria's Secret soon escalated into a public crisis. In 2019, an activist shareholder, CEO James A. Mitarotonda of Barington Capital Group, L.P., criticized Razek and pressured L Brands in an open letter to update the brand image and switch up the predominantly male board of directors at the company.

=== Resignation and subsequent allegations ===
In response to the backlash against Razek, the company hired its first openly transgender model, Valentina Sampaio, in August 2019. Razek later apologized on social media and, in August 2019, he stepped down. In November 2019, the annual fashion show was officially cancelled after running for over two decades of production.

In 2020, The New York Times reported that Razek "presided over an entrenched culture of misogyny, bullying, and harassment". Interviews with more than 30 current and former executives, employees, contractors and models alleged that Wexner and Razek played prominent roles in cultivating the toxic environment. The shareholders of Victoria's Secret parent company, L Brands, filed a complaint in the Court of Chancery of Delaware on January 14, 2021, stating that chair Wexner and Razek, whose misconduct was "widely known", created an "entrenched culture of misogyny, bullying and harassment", which breached the directors' fiduciary duty to the company, causing devaluation of the brand.
