= Michael Steinhardt =

American businessman (born 1940)

- Born: December 7, 1940 (age 85); New York City, U.S.
- Education: University of Pennsylvania (B.S.)
- Occupations: Investor, hedge fund manager
- Years active: 1967 - present
- Spouse: Judy Steinhardt
- Children: 3, including Sara Berman

Michael H. Steinhardt (born December 7, 1940) is an American billionaire hedge fund manager and philanthropist. In 1967, he founded a hedge fund, Steinhardt Partners, which he ran until he closed it in 1995. After a hiatus from work, he returned to head WisdomTree Investments in 2004. In January 2014, he was on the cover of Forbes Magazine, referred to as "Wall Street's greatest trader". Forbes reported his net worth at $1.1 billion as of October 2018.

== Early life ==
Steinhardt earned a bachelor's degree at the Wharton School of the University of Pennsylvania, graduating in 1960. He started his career working for the mutual fund Calvin Bullock and the brokerage firm Loeb, Rhoades & Co. (the precursor to Shearson Loeb Rhoades). Steinhardt's father, Sol Frank "Red" Steinhardt, was the fence of the Genovese Crime Family, which also included Charles “Lucky” Luciano, Frank Costello, Bugsy Siegel, Meyer Lansky (“Hyman Roth” in Godfather II), and Vincent “Jimmy Blue Eyes” Alo.

Michael Steinhardt's father was his first investment client, giving his son envelopes stuffed with cash to put in the stock market giving him seed money to begin his investment career.

== Investment career ==
=== Early career ===
Working as an analyst at Loeb, Rhoades & Co., Steinhardt followed the conglomerate industry, which included companies such as Automatic Sprinkler (now defunct), City Investing (also defunct), and the best-known conglomerate of its day, Gulf+Western (now part of Viacom and Viacom's spinoff CBS).

=== Steinhardt Partners ===
In 1967, using earnings from his investments, Steinhardt founded the hedge fund Steinhardt, Fine, and Berkowitz (later Steinhardt Partners) with co-investors William Salomon, former managing partner of Salomon Brothers and Jack Nash, founder of Odyssey Partners.

Between 1967 and 1995, Steinhardt Partners averaged an annualized return for its clients of 24.5%, after a 1% management fee and a "performance fee" of 15% (early in his career, later 20%) of all annual gains, realized and unrealized, nearly triple the annualized performance of the S&P 500 Index over the same timeframe. After decades of successfully managing the fund, Steinhardt and his firm were investigated for allegedly trying to manipulate the short-term Treasury Note market in the early 1990s. He personally paid 75% of a total fine of $70 million as part of settlement with the U.S. Securities and Exchange Commission and Department of Justice. His firm made $600 million on the Treasury positions. In his book, No Bull, Steinhardt said he did nothing wrong, but merely settled the case in order to "move on".

His fund lost 1/3 of its value in the 1994 bond market crisis. In 1995, after finishing up 25%, decided to close his fund, stating, "I thought there must be something more virtuous, more ennobling to do with one's life than make rich people richer," before returning to work in 2004 to head WisdomTree Investments, a fund with nearly US$64 billion in assets under management. The hedge fund distributed all monies to its limited partners at the end of 1995.

=== WisdomTree Investments ===
In 2004, Steinhardt came out of retirement to work for Index Development Partners, Inc., now known as WisdomTree Investments. He is chairman of WisdomTree, which offers dividend and earnings-based index funds rather than traditional index funds based on market capitalization. As of July 2018, WisdomTree had $41.2 billion under management. During the fall of 2007 and 2008, WisdomTree's growth stagnated, as the stock market, especially the financial sector, in which WisdomTree's dividend-based funds are overweighted, tanked, as did WisdomTree's stock. However, as the WisdomTree funds tended to outperform their "bogies," asset growth resumed its earlier pace and its stock price appreciated accordingly.

== Wealth and philanthropy ==
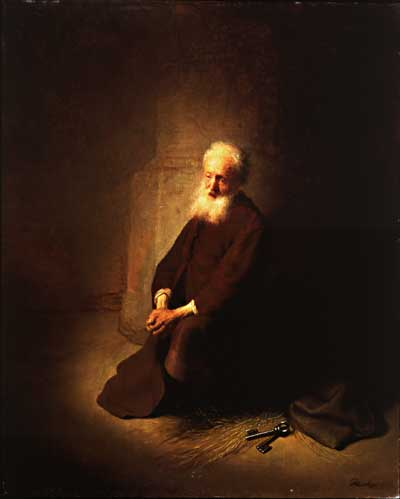
Ceded to American Friends of the Israel Museum by Judy and Michael Steinhardt: St. Peter in Prison (The Apostle Peter Kneeling), Rembrandt, 1631.

Forbes Magazine reported Steinhardt's net worth at US$1.1 billion as of October 2018. The Steinhardt School of Culture, Education and Human Development at New York University bears his name in recognition of two $10 million donations. After 2018 sexual harassment allegations against Steinhardt, the student government at the school called for removal of the philanthropist’s name; a call which was renewed after his 2021 deal with the Manhattan District Attorney about Steinhardt's 180 stolen antiquities.

In the 1990s, Steinhardt bought and donated Steeple Jason Island and Grand Jason Island in the Falkland Islands to the Wildlife Conservation Society (WCS), along with US$425,000 for a research station to be named after himself and his wife. Steinhardt invested in baseball teams, owning part of the Miami Marlins and the Los Angeles Dodgers.

Steinhardt is the past chairman of the Democratic Leadership Council and a board member of the Foundation for Defense of Democracies, to which he donated $250,000 in 2002.

=== Jewish causes ===
Steinhardt is chairman of the board at The Steinhardt Foundation for Jewish Life and Taglit-Birthright Israel. He also makes public appearances, speaking with young Jewish children through organizations such as Ezra USA and RAJE. He has been an active philanthropist, donating over $125 million to Jewish causes. In 1999, he and Charles Bronfman co-founded Taglit-Birthright Israel, which sends young Jews aged 18–26 on a 10-day trip to Israel without charge. In 2009, Steinhardt gave the American Hebrew Academy $5 million. The American Hebrew Academy released an advertisement featuring his endorsement.

Steinhardt has founded a network of Hebrew-language charter schools, which are secular and open to both Jews and non-Jews. He has said "these schools teach Hebrew in a way that is demonstrably superior to Jewish day schools".

Steinhardt is part of the "Mega Group" (also known as the Study Group) – a loosely organized club of 20 of the most wealthy and influential Jewish businessmen. The "Mega Group" was formed by Leslie Wexner, chairman of Limited Inc. and Charles and Edgar Bronfman Sr., chairmen of Seagram.

Steinhardt is a strong supporter of the State of Israel, which he regards as the "Jewish miracle of the 20th century". He views Israel as "the most moral state on this planet", and in a 2017 interview said "The more one understands about Israel, the more comfortable one becomes with the politics of the Israeli government."

In April 2017, he made history after being selected as one of two diaspora Jews to light an official torch at the State of Israel Independence Day Torch-lighting Ceremony (Israel) as a symbol of "Jewish unity" for contributions as the co-founder of Taglit-Birthright Israel.

Steinhardt was chairman of the board of Tel Aviv University, where he received an honorary doctorate in 2011, and endowed the Steinhardt Museum of Natural History in Ramat Aviv.

=== Publishing ===
In 2001, Steinhardt made his foray into publishing. He, along with several other investors, including Conrad Black, founded the New York Sun, a niche New York City newspaper best known for its pro-Israel support and neo-conservative outlook.

== Sexual harassment allegations ==
On September 12, 2018, The Jewish Week reported that Hillel International was investigating Steinhardt for "inappropriate sexual remarks" to two female employees of one of the organizations he supports. The Jewish Week story quoted "sources close to the investigation" as saying that since, 2015, when the first complaint by a female employee occurred, it has been a "practice" within the organization for no female employee to have meetings with Steinhardt alone. The second woman making allegations received a written apology from Steinhardt, dated August 23, 2011, acknowledging his inappropriate comments made toward her and two male colleagues at a meeting the year before. The report noted that Hillel had "quietly" removed his name from the board of governors listed on their website while the organization was investigating the claims. Hillel made an official statement that the complaints about sexual harassment by its donors were justified.

Steinhardt stated in response to the findings "If I had been told immediately about concerns regarding anything I said at the time, I would have apologized immediately. I only recently learned about this investigation when Hillel called me about comments I made several years ago. I am sorry and deeply regret causing any embarrassment, discomfort or pain, which was never my intention." As of March 2019, six women had come forward alleging that Steinhardt had made unwanted sexual requests of them.

== Private antiquities collection and lifetime ban from collecting artifacts ==
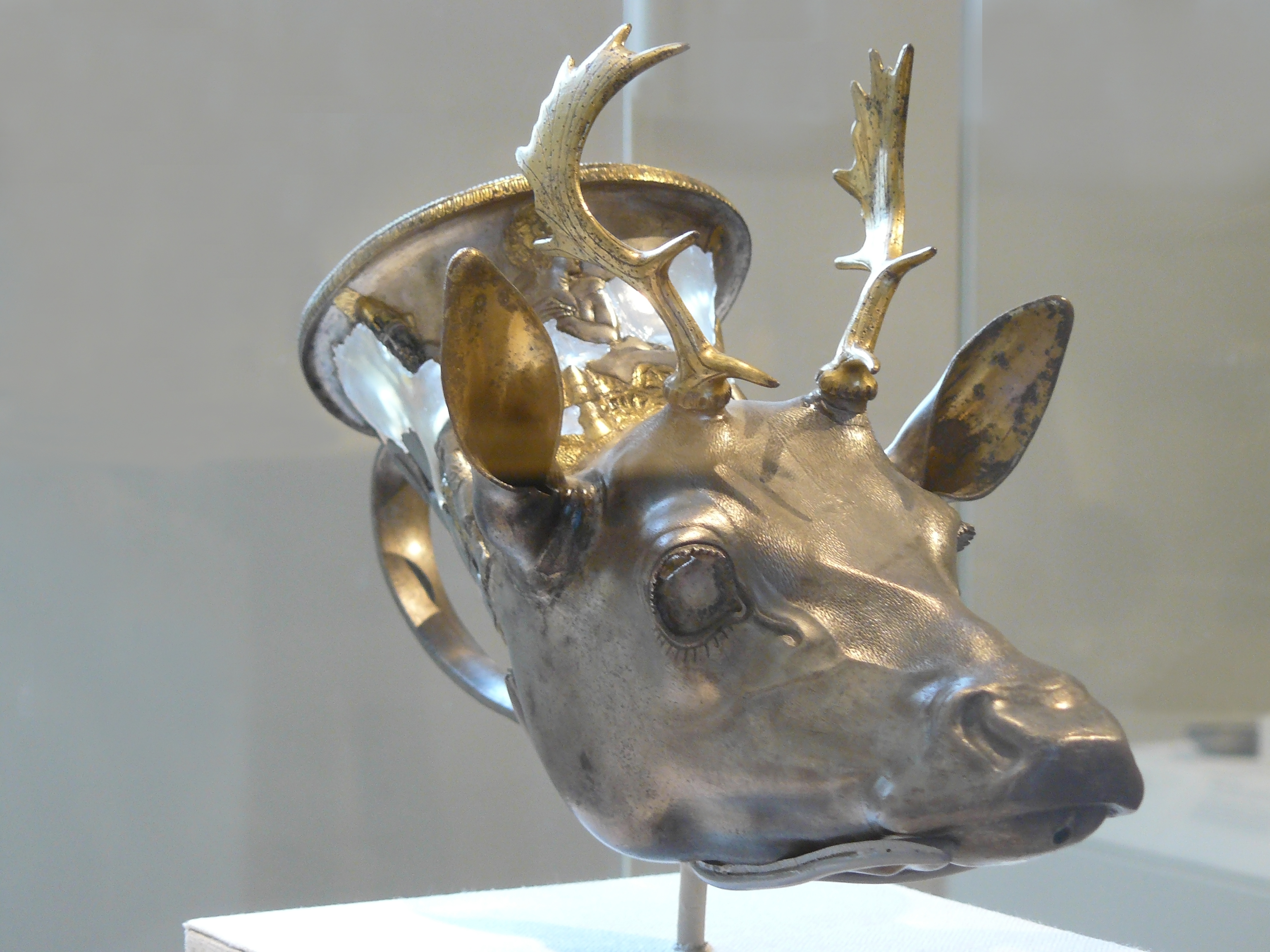
A Stag's Head Rhyton, dating to 400 B.C.E., first appeared without provenance on the international art market after looting in Milas, Turkey. In March 1993, Steinhardt loaned the Stag's Head Rhyton to the Met, where it remained until the D.A.'s office applied for and received a warrant to seize it in 2021.

Steinhardt is an art collector, especially of antiquities. A special exhibition, "Ancient Art of the Cyclades", held at the Katonah Museum of Art included some pieces owned by him. He sat on the American advisory board of Christie's, the art & antiques auction house.

In November 2014, Christie's had to withdraw a prehistoric sculpture from Sardinia, valued at $800,000-$1.2m, put on auction by Steinhardt and previously put on sale by the notorious and convicted antiquities dealer Giacomo Medici. In January 2018, investigators raided Steinhardt's New York City apartment and seized a large amount of stolen antiquities which had been illegally purchased by Steinhardt.

In December 2021, after a four-year multinational investigation examining his "acquisition, possession and sale of more than 1,000 antiquities since at least 1987", Steinhardt reached an agreement with the New York County District Attorney to relinquish 180 items with an estimated value of $70 million, in exchange for the dismissal of a grand jury investigation into his collection. As part of the deal, Steinhardt was being permanently banned from acquiring new pieces. Steinhardt kept the remaining pieces that he legally purchased. The seized antiquities were slated to be returned to their proper owners in much of the Eastern Mediterranean region, as well as Bulgaria and Iraq.

In a press release, District Attorney Cyrus Vance Jr. said, "For decades, Michael Steinhardt displayed a rapacious appetite for plundered artifacts without concern for the legality of his actions, the legitimacy of the pieces he bought and sold, or the grievous cultural damage he wrought across the globe." The Grand Jury Investigation Statement of Facts stated that Steinhart acquired stolen antiquiries from Giacomo Medici, Giovanni Franco Becchina, Edoardo Almagià, Robin Symes, Robert Hecht, Edward and Samuel Merrin, Robert Haber, Eugene Alexander, Fritz and Harry Bürki, Gil Chaya, Rafi Brown, Michael Ward and others. A lawyer for Steinhardt said many of the dealers from whom he bought the artifacts "made specific representations as to the dealers’ lawful title to the items, and to their alleged provenance".

=== Heliodorus Stele ===
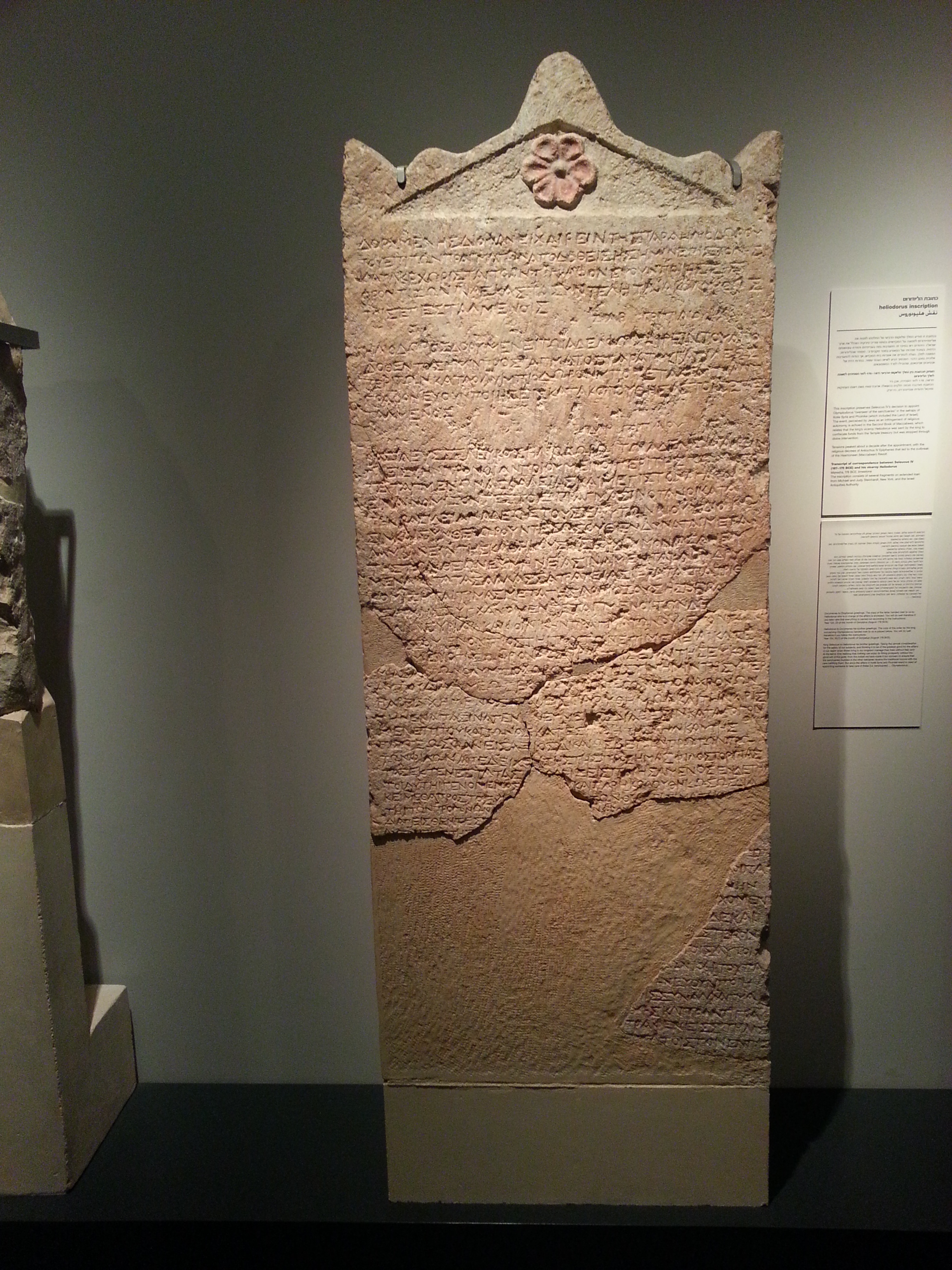
Heliodorus Stele, dating from 178 BC, of correspondence between Seleucus IV Philopator and Heliodorus

In 2007, Steinhardt lent Israel Museum the "Heliodorus Stele", (commons) which he had recently acquired. The stele was 2,200-year-old Greek text inscribed in limestone. However, an expert soon noted that two pieces excavated from a cave in Maresha fit the Heliodorus Stele "like a jigsaw puzzle", and hence concluded that the stele came from the same cave. In December 2021, the "Heliodorus Stele" was among the 180 artifacts Steinhardt agreed to surrender to the Manhattan District Attorney’s office. As of January 7, 2022, the "Heliodorus Stele" was still on display in the Israel Museum, together with two Neolithic masks.

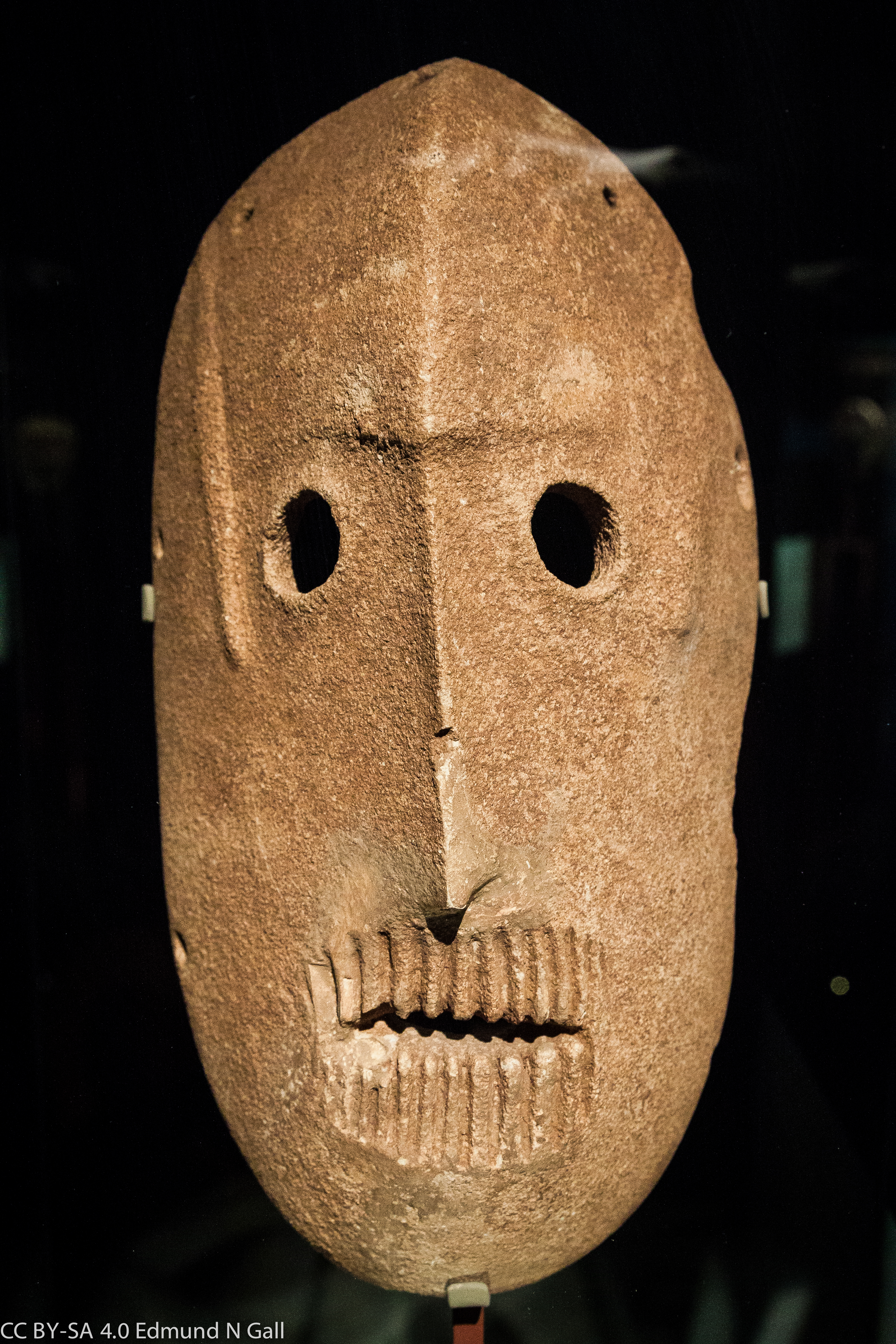
Looted Neolithic mask, lent by Steinhardt to Israel Museum

=== Guennol Stargazer ===
Steinhardt acquired the Guennol Stargazer in 1993. The marble idol depicts a nude human figure and is estimated to be 6,000 years old. The idol was sold for $14.4M including the buyer's premium at a historic Christie's auction in 2017, but the Turkish government sued to halt the sale, and so the buyer later backed out. A bench trial in 2021 ruled in Steinhardt's favor, determined that Turkey had waited too long to attempt to repatriate the idol, and that it would remain in Steinhardt's collection in the United States.

== Personal life ==
In 1967, Steinhardt met his future wife, Judy, in a carpool he organized. During one of the carpools into New York City, he mentioned the name of the grain elevator company Colorado Milling and Grain Elevator. Judy mentioned the company to her father, who invested in the company and made a substantial profit after Colorado Milling was acquired by Great Western Sugar in 1968; the merged company was renamed Great Western United. Judy is the chairwoman of New York University's Institute of Fine Arts and of the American Friends of the Israel Museum. They have three children. Their daughter, Sara Berman, a former journalist and parenting columnist for The New York Sun, is the president of the Hebrew Language Academy Charter School in Brooklyn.

In Sebastian Mallaby's 2010 book More Money Than God: Hedge Funds and the Making of a New Elite, he dedicated a chapter to Steinhardt. He described Steinhardt as a "lover of botany and a collector of exotic fauna," living in his retirement "on his country estate an hour's drive north of New York City". Mallaby included a photo of Steinhardt "dancing on his estate opposite... an elegant blue crane . . . that had taken to courting him with a graceful gavotte".

In 2001, Steinhardt published an autobiography, No Bull: My Life in and out of Markets. In this book, he addressed for the first time the question of his father, Sol Frank Steinhardt, who also went by the moniker "Red McGee". "Red" Steinhardt was convicted in 1958 on two counts of buying and selling stolen jewelry and was sentenced to serve two 5-to-10 year terms, to run consecutively, in the New York State prison system. In his book, Steinhardt describes how his father bankrolled his early forays into the stock market by giving him envelopes stuffed with $10,000 in cash and sometimes much more than that. The book also suggests that Steinhardt's education at the Wharton School may have been paid for with illicit funds.

In 2008, he was inducted into Institutional Investors Alpha's Hedge Fund Manager Hall of Fame along with Julian Robertson, Kenneth Griffin, Steven A. Cohen, and others.

== See also ==
- List of University of Pennsylvania people
