= Leonard Schlesinger =

American business educator (born 1952)

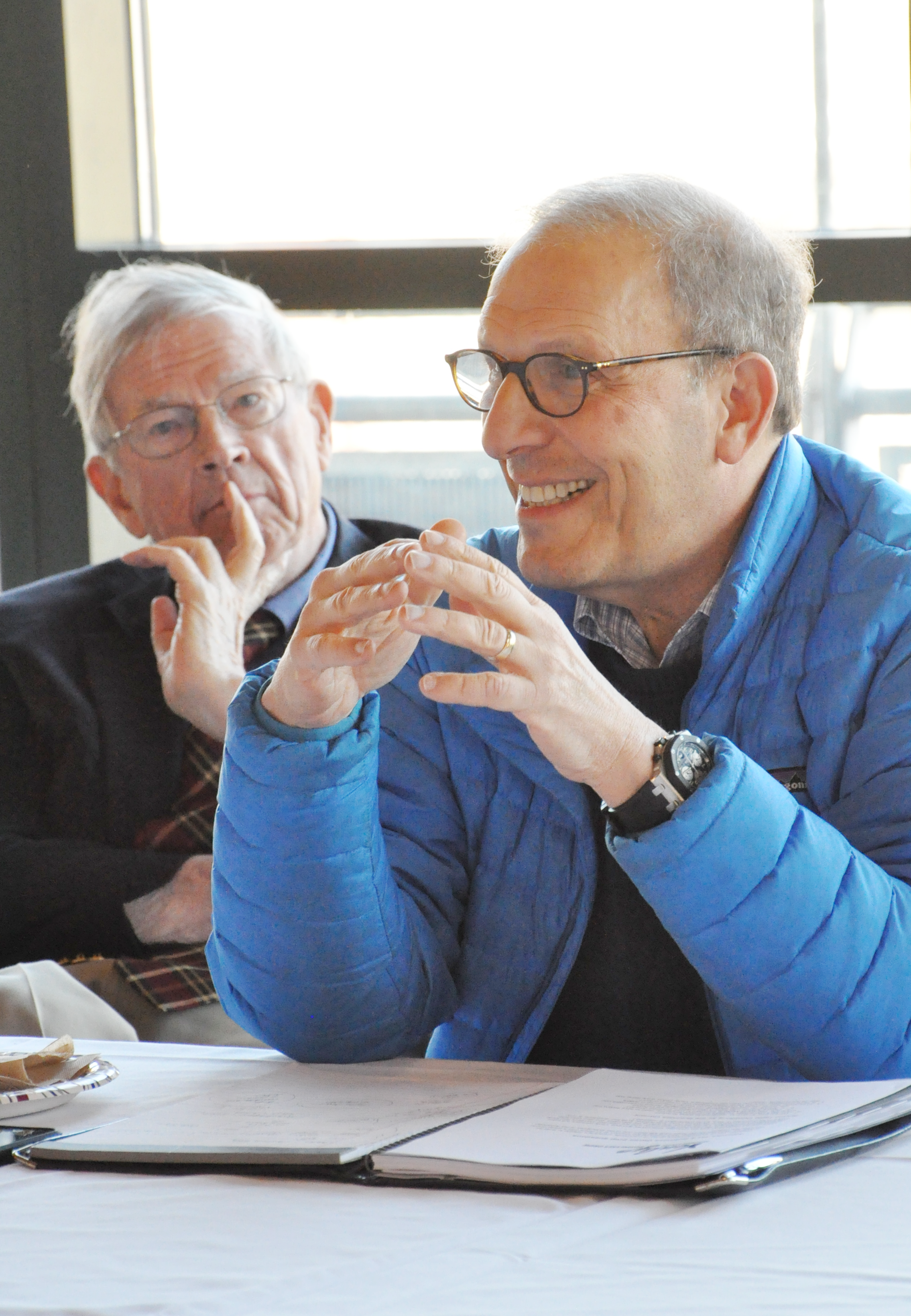
- Schlesinger (foreground) with John H. McArthur in 2018
- Born: 1952 (age 73–74)
- Other name: Len Schlesinger
- Education: Brown University (BA); Columbia University (MBA); Harvard University (DBA)
- Occupations: Professor; business executive; academic administrator
- Employers: Academia: Harvard Business School; Brown University; Babson College; Industry: Limited Brands; Au Bon Pain
- Known for: Business management and education

Leonard A. Schlesinger (born 1952) is an American educator and business manager who currently serves as Baker Foundation Professor at Harvard Business School (HBS). He was the 12th president of Babson College from 2008 to 2013. As a member of the practice-based faculty at HBS, Schlesinger has previously held roles in business leadership, including as a vice president and chief operating officer at Au Bon Pain and Limited Brands between 1985 and 2007.

== Early life and education ==
Born in 1952, Schlesinger graduated from Brown University in 1972 with a Bachelor of Arts degree in American civilization. He received an MBA from Columbia Business School in 1973 and a DBA in organizational behavior from Harvard Business School in 1979.

== Career ==
=== Harvard Business School ===
Schlesinger first joined the faculty of Harvard Business School in 1978 as an instructor in organizational behavior. From 1979 to 1982, he was an assistant professor of business administration at the school, and from 1983 to 1985 he was an associate professor.

Later working at HBS between 1988 and 1998, Schlesinger was first a business administration lecturer before becoming an associate professor in 1989 and professor in 1993. During this time, he taught MBA courses on service management and the information economy. In 1993–1994, Schlesinger chaired the MBA program redesign team. He served as the senior associate dean for external relations from 1994 to 1995 and as George Fisher Baker Jr. Professor of Business Administration from 1994 to 1998. From 1998 to 1999, Schlesinger was a development administrator and professor of sociology and public policy at Brown University before again leaving for a position in industry.

Since his return from Babson College in 2013, Schlesinger has remained at Harvard Business School as Baker Foundation Professor. Since 2021 he has chaired the HBS practice faculty. He teaches MBA and executive education courses on management, leadership, and human resources, as well as direct-to-consumer and healthcare industry topics. In 2023, Schlesinger hosted Kim Kardashian—media personality and founder of Skims—on campus for an invited lecture on her direct-to-consumer business model.

=== Babson College ===
Schlesinger became the 12th president of Babson College in Wellesley, Massachusetts, on July 1, 2008. During his tenure, Babson increased its undergraduate enrollment and its entrepreneurship programs at the undergraduate, graduate, executive, and global education levels. In a 2011 interview with The Atlantic, Schlesinger noted the importance of humor in leadership. He also described his goal to increase the availability of a Babson education.

At the end of the 2013 academic year, Schlesinger stepped down as president. He was succeeded by Kerry Murphy Healey. The next year, he was awarded an honorary Doctor of Laws degree by the college, and in 2015 the college named the Leonard A. Schlesinger Innovation Center in his honor.

=== Business executive ===
Schlesinger worked for Procter & Gamble in Green Bay, Wisconsin, from 1973 to 1975, where he was a team manager for the facial tissue converting department and later an organizational development specialist.

In 1985 Schlesinger left Harvard to work as the executive vice president and treasurer of Au Bon Pain; he became their chief operating officer in 1987 and served in that role until returning to HBS in 1988.

After leaving higher education again, Schlesinger was an executive vice president at Limited Brands—based in Columbus, Ohio—from 1991 to 2003, and the company's chief operating officer from 2003 to 2007. He held a leadership role in operations of the Victoria's Secret beauty line, Bath & Body Works, Henri Bendel, and other brands.

==== Directorships ====
Schlesinger has held directorships and board membership at several for-profit and not-for-profit organizations, including Beth Israel Deaconess Medical Center, BJ's Wholesale Club, and Olin College in the 1990s and 2000s, and Wheaton College, RH, Demandware, and the Network for Teaching Entrepreneurship since 2010. Additionally, he has served as a board member of Data Point Capital, which invested in Print Syndicate in 2015; he joined the board of that company as well. In 2019, he chaired the search for the new CEO of MassChallenge.

Schlesinger also serves on the advisory council of Goldman Sachs' 10,000 Small Businesses initiative, and is a member of the Council on Competitiveness and the Council on Foreign Relations.

== Research ==
As an author or co-author, Schlesinger has published 15 books on productivity, organizational design and behavior, and service management. His other research interests include innovating businesses beyond direct-to-consumer models and the growth of executives into effective leaders. He is a co-developer of the service–profit chain concept linking employee satisfaction to profitability. The concept was first introduced in a 1994 Harvard Business Review article by James L. Heskett, et al. Schlesinger has also written for The New York Times, Fast Company, Forbes, and the MIT Sloan Management Review.

=== Reception ===
His academic and popular works have been the subject of academic discourse. Schlesinger co-published Managing Behavior in Organizations (McGraw-Hill, 1983), a textbook on organizational behavior; although it includes several case studies and readings, reviews noted that it was lacking the necessary foundational context needed for its effective use in an introductory course. The Management Game (Sidgwick & Jackson, 1988) by Ardis Burst and Schlesinger is a non-academic book, and received reviews from Kirkus Reviews and Publishers Weekly. In an academic review, one reviewer said it was "in no way ... a serious contribution to management literature", but instead a "fun book" drawing on the case-study approach to education.

His book with Heskett and W. Earl Sasser, The Service Profit Chain (Free Press, 1997) received generally positive reviews, though one academic notes that not all industries are focused on profit, as the book centers on. Daniel Isenberg, writing in Forbes, described Action Trumps Everything (Black Ink Press, 2010), co-written with Charles Kiefer and Paul B. Brown, as a "must-read book".

== Personal life ==
Schlesinger is a resident of Dover, Massachusetts. He is married to Phyllis Schlesinger, who taught at Babson from 1988 to 2001, and has three children.
