= Steinhardt Foundation for Jewish Life =

American non-profit organization founded 1994

The Steinhardt Foundation for Jewish Life (Steinhardt Foundation) is a New York City based non-profit foundation, created in 1994, which funds projects and programs aimed at improving Jewish education and identity for American Jews. As of October 2022, Rabbi David Gedzelman is the president and CEO of the Steinhardt Foundation.

== Background ==
The Steinhardt Foundation was created as the Jewish Life Network by former hedge fund manager Michael Steinhardt, who disbanded his financial practice to focus on philanthropy. A founding initiative, co-sponsored with the Israeli government, private donors, and Jewish communities around the world, is the Birthright Israel program, to provide young Jews, age 18 to 26 years old, the opportunity to tour Israel for the first time.

== Disbursement ==
As of April 2005, the foundation had disbursed over $100 million to various educational, cultural and service causes, including starting and/or funding: the PEJE in 1997; programs at the 92nd Street Y; the Steinhardt School of Culture, Education, and Human Development at New York University; and the Steinhardt Social Research Institute at Brandeis University.

From 2000 to 2013, the Steinhardt Foundation co-sponsored the annual Harold Grinspoon Foundation Awards for Excellence in Jewish Education, renamed the Grinspoon-Steinhardt Awards for Excellence in Jewish Education during that period.

From 1998 to 2018, the Steinhardt Foundation published the quarterly magazine Contact.
