= Galyan's =

Defunct sporting goods chain

Galyan's Trading Company
- Type: Division
- Traded as: Nasdaq: GLYN (2001–2005)
- Industry: Retail
- Founded: 1946; 80 years ago, in Plainfield, Indiana
- Founder: Albert and Naomi Galyan
- Defunct: 2005; 21 years ago
- Fate: Acquired by Dick's Sporting Goods
- Successor: Dick's Sporting Goods
- Headquarters: Plainfield, Indiana, United States
- Number of locations: 47 (2005)
- Area served: United States
- Products: Sporting goods
- Parent: The Limited
- Website: Archived official website at the Wayback Machine (archive index)

Galyan's Trading Company was an American sporting goods chain. It was founded in Plainfield, Indiana.

The store began in 1946 as a grocery store, founded by Albert and Naomi Galyan. By the 1960s, the Galyans began selling sporting goods instead. The chain was purchased in 1995 by The Limited. At the time, the chain consisted of only five stores, but grew to 20 by 1999 when The Limited sold 60% of the company to the investment firm of Freeman, Spogli & Company. The company became a publicly traded company when it released its IPO on NASDAQ in 2001. Many of the stores featured rock climbing walls, golf simulators, and archery ranges.

By 2005, Galyan's had 47 stores in 21 states. That same year, the chain was acquired by Dick's Sporting Goods.
