= Leonard Abramson =

American businessman (1932–2026)

- Born: November 12, 1932; Philadelphia, Pennsylvania, U.S.
- Died: July 4, 2026 (aged 93); Blue Bell, Pennsylvania, U.S.
- Education: Philadelphia College of Pharmacy and Science
- Occupations: Businessman, philanthropist
- Known for: Founder and CEO of U.S. Healthcare
- Spouse: Madlyn (m. 1957–2020)
- Children: Marcy Abramson Shoemaker, Nancy Abramson Wolfson, and Judith Abramson Felgoise

Leonard Abramson (November 12, 1932 – July 4, 2026) was an American businessman and philanthropist. Abramson was best known for founding U.S. Healthcare, a managed care company that along with its parent company, Aetna, is now part of CVS Health, one of the world's largest healthcare companies by revenue and reach.

== Early life and career ==
Leonard Abramson was born in Philadelphia, Pennsylvania on November 12, 1932. He was raised in the Strawberry Mansion neighborhood of Philadelphia to Jewish parents. Abramson attended the Philadelphia College of Pharmacy and Science, driving a taxi for cash to cover his expenses. After graduating, he worked as a salesman for pharmaceutical company Parke-Davis. He then worked as a retail pharmacist for six years and then took a job with R.H. Medical Inc., a small hospital-management company then headquartered in Cheltenham, Pennsylvania, where he served as vice president for corporate development. Relying upon federal funding available through the HMO act of 1973, and the employer's obligation to offer HMO to employees, he left R.H. Medical and with the aid of $3 million in federal loans, he founded a non-profit HMO, HMO of Pennsylvania. In 1981, he abandoned the company's nonprofit status and in 1983, he took the parent company, renamed U.S. Healthcare Inc., public.

Abramson headed U.S. Healthcare from 1975 until 1996, when he sold it to Aetna for $8.3 billion. He then served on Aetna's board of directors from 1996 to 2000. In 1990, Abramson published a book, Healing Our Health Care System, attacking what he perceived to be the problems of the American health care system, which he called "nothing less than a national disgrace."

== Philanthropic activities ==
Madlyn Abramson was a cancer survivor, and the family gave a donation summing up to $140 million to build the Abramson Cancer Research Institute at the University of Pennsylvania Cancer Center. Additional contributions were given to fund the Leonard and Madlyn Abramson Pediatric Research Center in the Children’s Hospital of Philadelphia, professorships and chairs in the University of Pennsylvania and in Johns Hopkins' medical schools, and to the Foundation for Defense of Democracies.

== Personal life and death ==
Abramson married Madlyn Abramson in August 1957; they had three children. Madlyn predeceased him in 2020. The Madlyn and Leonard Abramson Center for Jewish Life in North Wales, Pennsylvania, is named in honor of the couple. In the late 1990s, Abramson sued Inside Edition for invading his privacy when the news show covertly videotaped him and his family at their Jupiter, Florida, home, as part of an exposé on the lifestyles of wealthy HMO executives.

During August 2022, Abramson sold his 7,509-square-foot home at the waterfront of Jupiter's Admirals Cove for a reported $7 million.

Abramson died in Blue Bell, Pennsylvania on July 4, 2026, at the age of 94.
