= Roy Raymond =

American businessman (1947–1993)

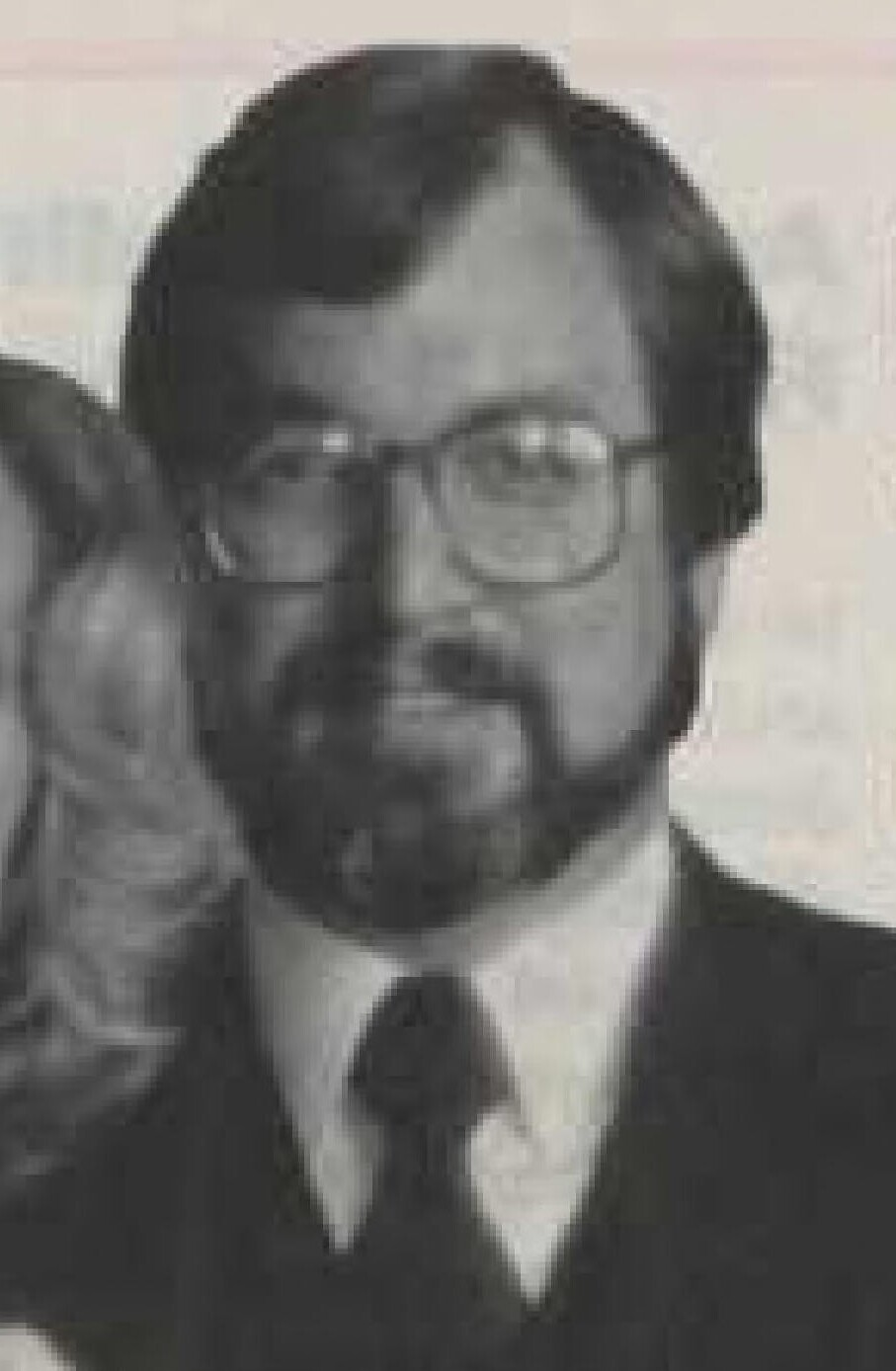
- Raymond c. 1982
- Born: Roy Larson Raymond; April 15, 1947; Connecticut, U.S.
- Died: August 26, 1993 (aged 46); San Francisco, California, U.S.
- Education: Tufts University (BA; 1969); Stanford Graduate School of Business (MBA; 1971)
- Occupation: Entrepreneur
- Known for: Founder of Victoria's Secret
- Spouse(s): Gaye Raymond (m. 1970s; div. 1990)

Roy Larson Raymond (April 15, 1947 – August 26, 1993) was an American businessman who founded the Victoria's Secret lingerie retail store in California in 1977.

== Early life and education ==
Roy Raymond was born April 15, 1947, in Connecticut. He started an early business at age 13 in Fairfield that produced wedding invitations. He attended Tufts University, graduating in 1969. Raymond earned his master's degree in Business Administration from the Stanford Graduate School of Business in 1971.

== Career ==
=== Early career ===
Raymond worked in marketing for several companies early in his career, including Guild Wineries, Richardson-Merrell, and the Vicks company. His greater aspiration was to start his own business.

=== Victoria's Secret ===
On June 12, 1977, Victoria's Secret was founded by Roy and Gaye Raymond in Delaware. Raymond opened the first Victoria's Secret store at the Stanford Shopping Center in Palo Alto, California. Raymond was inspired to start Victoria's Secret after feeling embarrassed purchasing lingerie for his wife in a department store. To open the store, he borrowed $40,000 from a bank and $40,000 from his family. Roy and Gaye Raymond worked together to design and launch the first store with a Victorian-inspired style. A reference to Queen Victoria, the name Victoria's Secret was meant to evoke the sophistication and propriety associated with Victorian era boudoirs while alluding to the "secret" underneath the clothes. On selecting the name Victoria for the business, Raymond stated that there were "a couple hundred names we came up with, but only that one seemed to have all the elements for the character we were trying to portray."

The company earned $500,000 in its first year and Raymond started a mail order catalog and opened three stores in San Francisco.

Leslie Wexner discovered Raymond's store in the early 1980s, described it as unique, and declared that he had never encountered anything like it in his travels. Although Wexner was interested in purchasing Victoria's Secret, Raymond was initially wary of Wexner, who later stated "When I met him, it was as if he met the devil." Six months later the business was headed towards bankruptcy, and Raymond contacted Wexner to discuss a potential sale. In 1982, after five years of operation, Raymond sold the Victoria's Secret company for $1 million to Wexner, with its five stores and 42-page catalogue, then reported to be grossing $6 million per year.

For approximately a year after the sale to Wexner, Raymond stayed on as president of Victoria's Secret while working towards the start of his next company, an upscale store for children called My Child's Destiny. In 1984, Raymond personally invested $850,000 in the new venture. The business catered to professional couples and sold computer games, imported dolls and expensive toys in a single store in San Francisco and through mail order catalogues. Business at the store suffered due to a poor location with limited walk in traffic and due to a limited marketing strategy which focused on the wealthy, contributing to an image of being elitist. In 1986, the company was forced to file for chapter 11 bankruptcy. As Raymond had not incorporated the company, he was ultimately liable for the financial burden. He and his wife lost their homes (in San Francisco and Lake Tahoe) as well as their vehicles. He continued to generate business ideas and to work towards the launch of companies including a children's book store (Quinby's), a mail-order home-repair hardware business, and a company that produced wigs for those who had lost their hair due to cancer treatments.

Raymond secured funding to launch Quinby's from Diane Disney Miller and Ron W. Miller, but within two years he was bought out due to financial disputes.

== Personal life ==
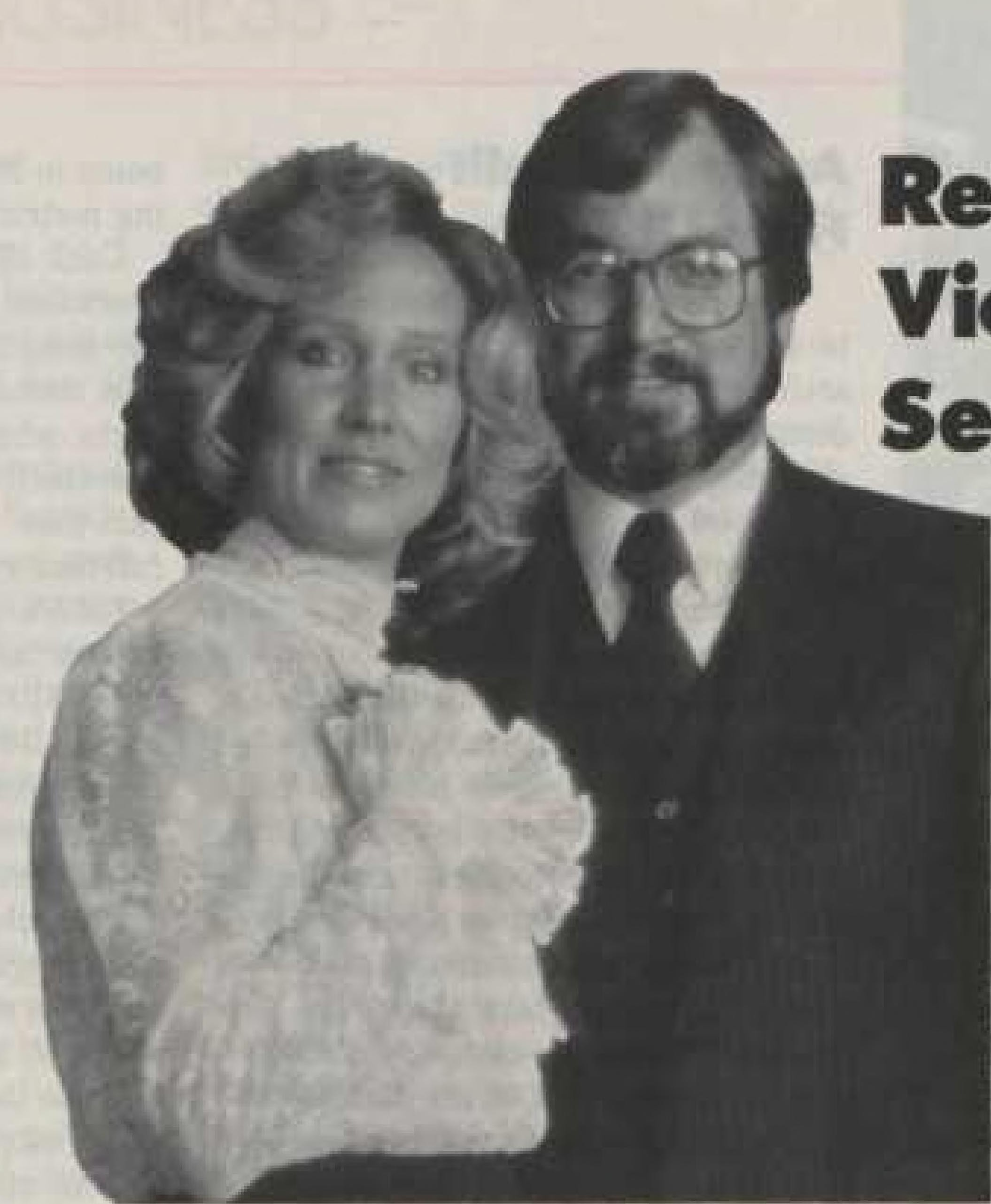
Roy and Gaye Raymond, c. 1982

Raymond and his wife, Gaye, had two children together, a son and a daughter; they divorced in 1990. After his divorce, Raymond was reportedly in a relationship with Peggy Knight of Ross, California.

== Death ==
On August 26, 1993, Raymond died by suicide by jumping off the Golden Gate Bridge. He was last seen walking toward the bridge, and hours afterward, his body was found by the Coast Guard near the Marin County shoreline. Investigators concluded that he had jumped off the bridge. Gaye Raymond stated that she believed he had suffered from depression following a series of business failures.
