= PEJE =

PEJE or Partnership for Excellence in Jewish Education is an organization designed to support Jewish day schools. It was founded in 1997 by Michael Steinhardt and 11 other partners, including Rabbi Irving "Yitz" Greenberg and Charles Schusterman who was the founding president of PEJE from its inception until his death in 2000. PEJE focuses on enhancing the leadership abilities of school leaders and school boards and providing financial support for schools. The organization collaborates with other Jewish education institutions such as JESNA, PARDeS, RAVSAK, SSDSA and the Yeshiva University Institute for University-School Partnership.

In 2016, PEJE became part of Prizmah: Center for Jewish Day Schools, a new organization encompassing five day school groups from different Jewish denominations.
