= Hilaire =

- Gender: Male

Origin
- Origin: French Hilarius
- Meaning: Happy, merry

Other names
- Related names: Hilary

Hilaire, the French form of Hilary, is a given name and surname derived from the Latin hilarius meaning happy or merry. Notable people with the name include:

== People with the surname ==
- Andrew Hilaire (1899–1935), American jazz drummer
- Laurent Hilaire (born 1962), French ballet dancer and ballet master
- Max Hilaire (born 1985), Haitian professional footballer
- Pierre-Marie Hilaire (born 1965), French athlete
- Ronald Hilaire (born 1984), Canadian gridiron football player and coach
- Vince Hilaire (born 1959), British professional footballer

== People with the given name ==
- Ambroise-Hilaire Comeau (1859–1911), Canadian politician
- Hilaire Babassana, Congolese politician and economist
- Hilaire Belloc (1870–1953), Anglo-French writer
- Hilaire de Barenton (1864–1946), French friar, linguist and historian
- Hilaire du Berrier (1906–2002), American pilot, barnstormer, and spy
- Hilaire de Chardonnet (1839–1924), French engineer and inventor of artificial silk
- Hilaire Cholette (1856–1905), Canadian physician and politician
- Hilaire Couvreur (1924–1998), Belgian cyclist
- Hilaire Deprez (1922–1957), Belgian sprint canoer
- Hilaire Hellebaut (1895–51), Belgian racing cyclist
- Hilaire Hiler (1898–1966), American artist, psychologist, and color theoretician
- Hilaire Hurteau (1837–1920), Canadian notary and political figure
- Hilaire Kédigui (born 1982), Chadian footballer
- Hilaire Mbakop (born 1973), Cameroonian literary scholar and writer
- Hilaire Momi (born 1990), Central African footballer
- Hilaire Neveu (1839–1913), Canadian politician
- Hilaire Noulens, nom de guerre of Jakob Rudnik (1894–1963), Ukrainian-born agent for the Otdel Mezhdunarodny Sviasy
- Hilaire Onwanlélé-Ozimo (born 1968), Gabonese Olympic athlete
- Hilaire Pader (1607–1677), French painter and poet
- Hilaire Penet (born 1501?), French composer
- Hilaire-Bernard de Longepierre (1659–1721), French playwright
- Hilaire Bernard de La Rivière (c. 1640–1729), Canadian architect, attorney, and notary
- Hilaire Rouelle (1718–1779), French chemist
- Hilaire Spanoghe (1879–unknown), Belgian footballer
- Hilaire Vanbiervliet (1890–1981), Belgian painter
- Jean-Hilaire Aubame (1912–1989), Gabonese politician
- Jean-Hilaire Belloc (1786–1866), French painter

== See also ==
- Saint-Hilaire (disambiguation)
