= Jean-Baptiste de La Croix de Chevrières de Saint-Vallier =

French bishop of Québec (1653–1727)

His Grace Jean-Baptiste de La Croix de Chevrières de Saint-Vallier
- Bishop of Québec
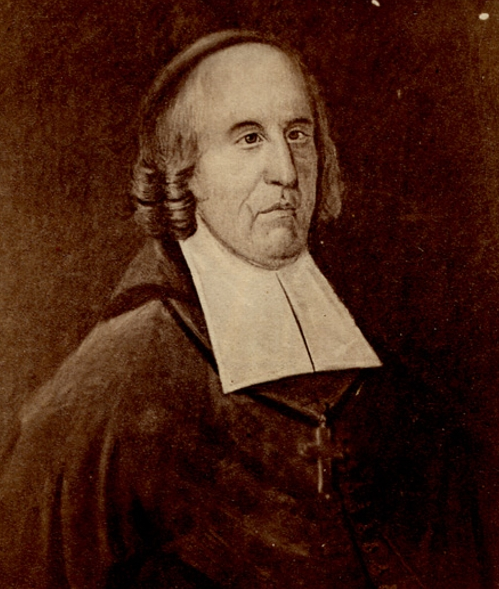
- Church: Roman Catholic Church
- Diocese: Québec
- See: Notre-Dame de Québec
- Installed: 7 July 1687
- Term ended: 26 December 1727
- Predecessor: François de Laval
- Successor: Louis-François Duplessis de Mornay

Personal details
- Born: 14 November 1653 Grenoble, France
- Died: 26 December 1727 (aged 74) Quebec City, New France
- Education: Saint-Sulpice Seminary, Paris

Jean-Baptiste de La Croix de Chevrières de St. Vallier (November 14, 1653 – December 26, 1727) was a French Catholic prelate who served as the second bishop of the Diocese of Quebec in the French colony of New France.

Born in Grenoble, France, in 1653 to a wealthy land owning family, Saint Vallier swiftly became a community figure, known for founding a hospital. He was named bishop of Quebec in 1685 by King Louis XIV on the recommendation of Bishop François de Laval, the first bishop of Quebec. Often referred to as Abbé Saint-Vallier, he was a controversial figure as Bishop of Quebec, since he rarely listened to advice. He spent large amounts of money that left the seminary in great debt at the time of death in 1727. He was deeply involved in the Catholic reform tradition and promoted several missions throughout Canada.

He was seen as a very strict leader for most of his reign. He refused demands for his resignation both by the King and the religious of New France. He was suspected of Jansenism, and his administration of the diocese led to popular revolts and struggles with various religious groups. Accomplishments during his 42-year reign include: the founding of the Hôpital-Général de Québec (1692); the edifice for the bishop (1688); commissioning architect Hilaire Bernard de La Rivière to build Notre-Dame-des-Victoires Church; and the installations of religious reformist communities in the Montreal area. The development of the Roman Catholic Archdiocese of Quebec and Roman Catholic faith was his utmost priority and interest; he was particularly sensible on the point of morality, which he believed was failing in his see. He was also greatly involved with the Society of Foreign Missions of Paris.

== Early life ==
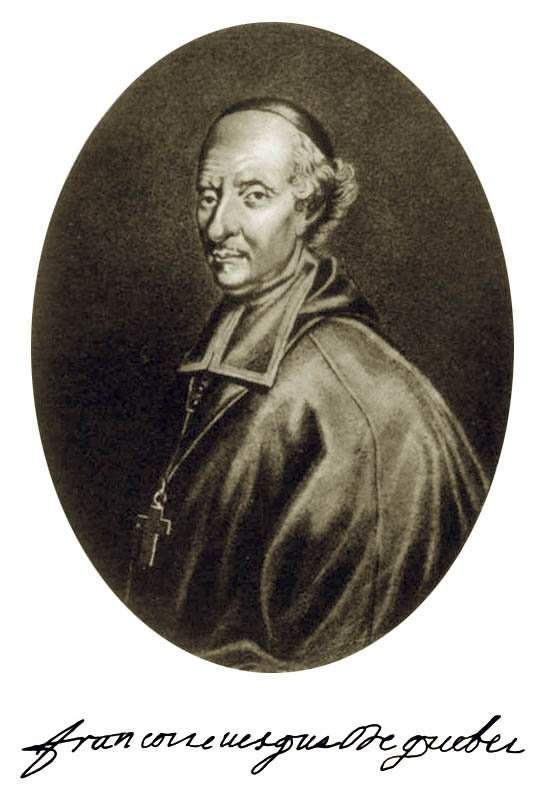
Bishop Laval

Jean-Baptiste Saint-Vallier was born on November 14, 1653, to Jean de La Croix de Chevrières de Saint-Vallier and Marie de Sayve. His father was a magistrate in Grenoble who later worked for the French diplomatic services. He belonged to the La Croix family of the French province of Dauphiné; his family included country noblemen, army officers, magistrates and ambassadors other royal courts. Jean-Baptiste's mother was the daughter of a magistrate in Dijon.

A wealthy family, the La Croixs held large landholdings in France, including Saint-Vallier Castle, a chateau in the Rhone Valley. Jean and Marie had ten children, three of whom would enter the religious life. Jean-Baptiste spent most of his childhood at Saint-Vallier Castle. Educated at Lycée Stendhal, the Jesuit college in Grenoble, he quickly gained a reputation for his charitable deeds.

Deciding to become a priest, Saint-Vallier entered the seminary of Saint-Sulpice in Paris, where he obtained his Licentiate in Theology in 1672 at age 19 years. In 1676, he was appointed as almoner-in-ordinary, in charge of helping the poor, to King Louis XIV, probably due to the La Croix family connections.

Saint-Vallier was ordained a priest in 1681. Using his personal funds, he built a small hospital in Saint-Vallier in 1683. A close friend of the bishop of Grenoble, Étienne Le Camus, Saint-Vallier would regularly visit hospitals, prisons and country parishes in the diocese. When attending the royal court of Louis XIV, Saint-Vallier always wore his religious attire.

Saint-Vallier rose quickly within the Catholic and social hierarchies in France. In 1685, Francois de Laval, bishop of Quebec, sent his resignation to Louis XIV and proposed Saint-Vallier as his replacement. Saint-Vallier's friends advised him to refuse the appointment. They argued that the Diocese of Quebec was too new and impoverished. In addition, it was too far from the royal court, the center of power in France. An observer termed Quebec as "...perhaps the most wretched and difficult of all the dioceses in mission lands".

However, Saint-Vallier saw the position of bishop as a chance to bring the reforms of the Counter-Reformation to the new world and spread the gospel to the native peoples. Despite all shortcomings of the assignment, Saint-Vallie in 1685 accepted the appointment as bishop and left for New France.

== Diocese of Quebec ==
During 17th and early 18th centuries, the Diocese of Quebec covered all of the French colonies in North America, known collectively as New France. These colonies included:

- Newfoundland, Acadia, Hudson Bay and Quebec, all in present-day Canada
- Louisiana, Illinois, and Upper Country, all in the present-day United States

The French colonies were inhabited by numerous First Nations tribes and European settlers. The European colonists included farmers, fishermen, sailors, merchants and ‘coureurs des bois. New France was governed by a French aristocratic elite in Quebec City. Like many of them, St. Vallier was a slave owner.

Between 1685 and 1730, the European population in New France jumped from 12,000 to 41,500. However, during the same period the First Nations population decreased from 163,500 to 61,500 due to diseases from Europe and warfare.

== Vicar-General of Quebec ==
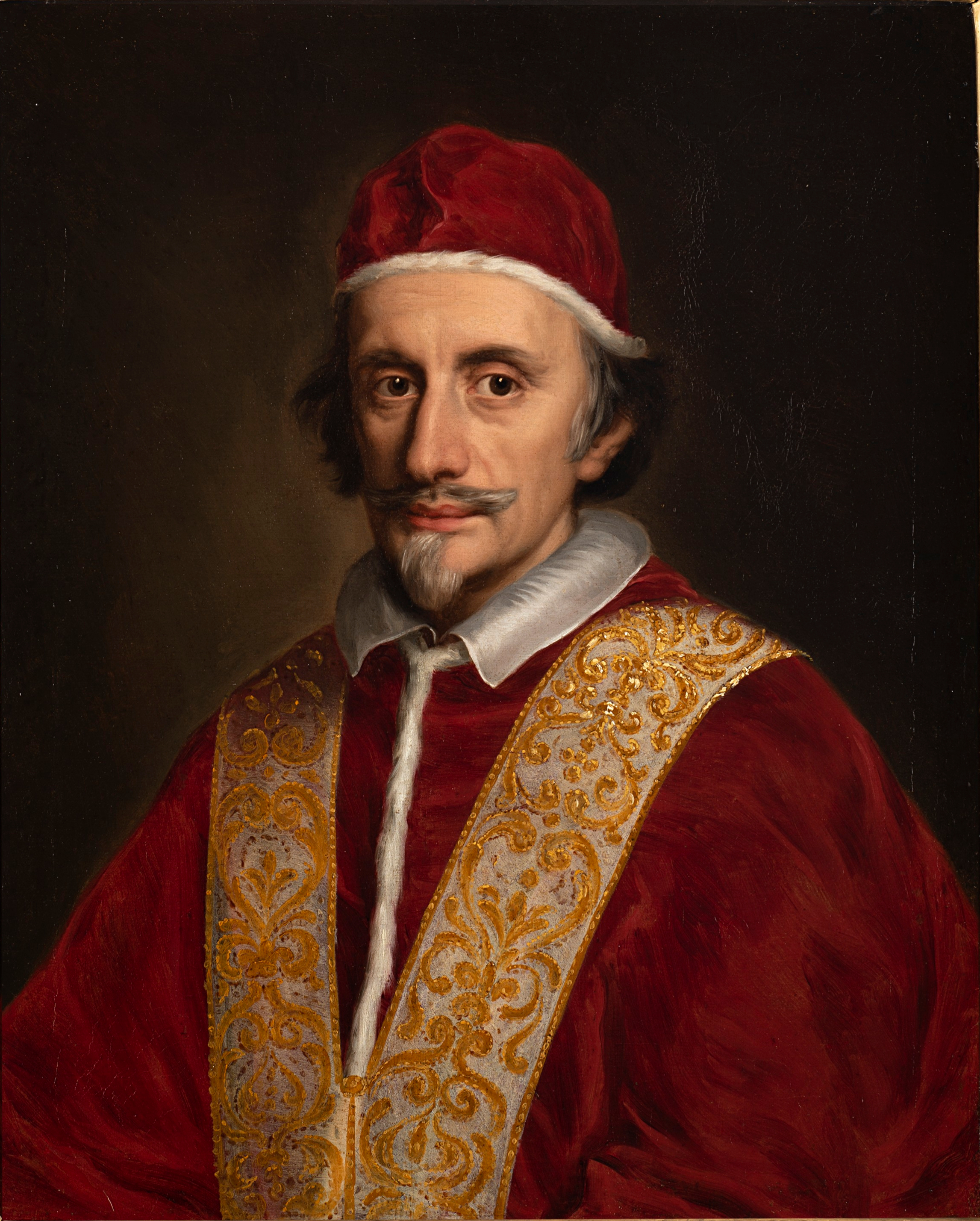
Pope Innocent XI (1650)

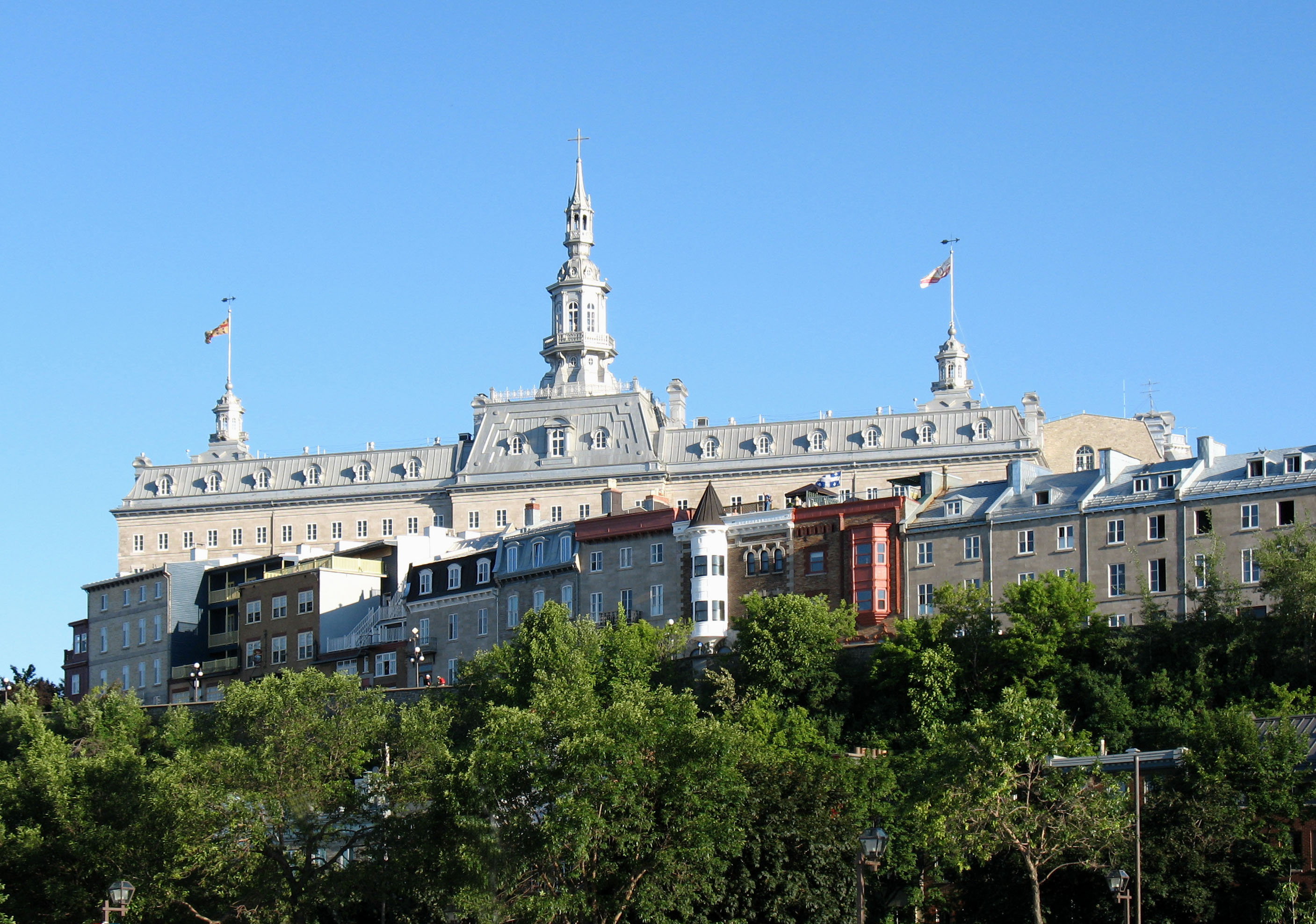
Seminary of Quebec, Quebec City (2009)

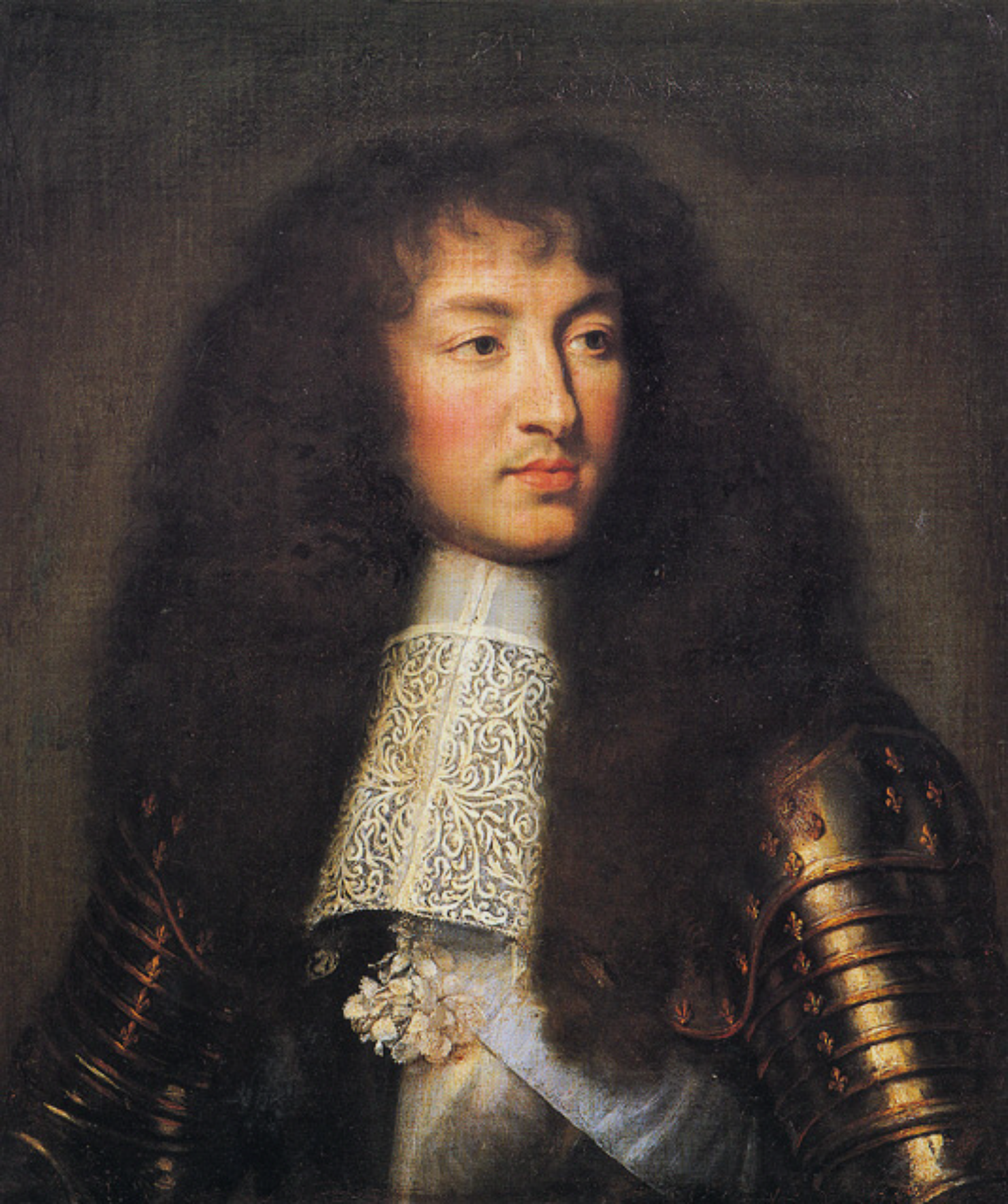
King Louis XIV of France (1662)

Before Saint-Vallier arrived in Quebec in 1685, Laval appointed him as vicar general, placing him in charge of the diocese. Since Pope Innocent XI was feuding with Louis XIV, the pope would not allow Saint-Vallier's consecration as bishop. Laval remained in France.

Saint-Vallier's first stay in New France lasted 18 months. Soon after arriving, he visited parishes in Quebec City, then traveled by boat to parishes down the St. Lawrence River to Montreal. He then undertook an arduous, 750 km trip overland to Acadia. During his travels, Saint-Vallier preached to European settlers and the First Nations tribes. In 1686, Saint-Vallier planned a visit to the French communities on the Great Lakes, but did not make the trip.

Like many dioceses in the Americas, the Diocese of Quebec contained many priests of religious orders who were there to evangelize the First Nations peoples. The religious orders in New France included the Missions Étrangères of Paris, the Jesuits and the Recollets. These religious priests frequently collaborated with religious sisters from the Congrégation de Notre-Dame or the Canonesses of St. Augustine of the Mercy of Jesus at l’Hôtel-Dieu de Québec. The religious priests were primarily governed by their orders and frequently clashed with bishops over matters of jurisdiction.

While the clergy in Quebec admired Saint-Vallier for his passion and energy, he quickly alienated them with his autocratic managerial style. He was also a lavish spender. While serving as vicar general, he left the Seminary of Quebec, founded by Laval, 10,000 livres in debt. Saint-Vallier led an austere lifestyle and believed that too many clergy were leading comfortable lives. He also objected to the sale of alcohol to the First Nations peoples, which was a profitable business for the merchants in New France and their church allies. Saint-Vallier was also a heavy spender of diocesan funds. While serving as vicar general, he left the Seminary of Quebec, founded by Laval, 10,000 livres in debt.

Feeling threatened by Saint-Vallier, the superiors of the Seminary wrote a letter to Laval in France. They complained that Saint-Vallier was acting like a tyrant and was an unsuitable choice for bishop. Still bishop of Quebec, Laval in 1687 ordered Saint-Vallier give up his post as vicar-general and return to France.

After arriving in Paris, Saint-Vallier went to Louis XIV. The king reiterated that Saint-Vallier would be the next bishop of Quebec and then banned Laval from returning there. Disappointed and angry, Laval now viewed Saint-Vallier as a manipulative traitor. He would later work to undermine him. That same year, Innocent XI finally allowed Saint-Vallier to be consecrated as bishop of Quebec. The ceremony took place at Saint-Sulpice Church in Paris on January 25, 1688. As a conciliatory gesture to Laval, Saint-Vallier asked Louis XIV to rescind his banishment from New France. Laval immediately left for Quebec. Saint-Vallier remained in France until the summer of 1688.

== Bishop of Quebec ==
=== 1688 to 1691 New France ===
When Saint-Vallier arrived back in New France, he discovered that Laval, in his absence, had established the Seminary of Quebec as its own religious order. Since three-quarters of the priests in Quebec now belonged to the Seminary, they were no longer under Saint-Vallier's jurisdiction as bishop. An infuriated Saint-Vallier demanded that the Seminary submit to his authority as bishop. The superiors, backed by Laval, refused.

"Mgr de Saint-Vallier worked on establishing more strict and clear pastoral norms […] the directives that he fixed throughout his episcopate concentrate mainly on the administration of the sacraments, especially the sacrament of penitence, and on the preaching"

=== 1691 France ===
In 1691, Saint-Vallier went to Paris to resolve the conflict with the Seminary of Quebec. Louis XIV appointed Archbishop François de Harlay de Champvallon of Paris and Reverend François de la Chaise, his private confessor, to serve as arbitrators. Saint-Vallier accused the Seminary of attempting to circumvent his authority. The Seminary accused him of being tyrannical and harboring sympathies for Jansenism. The arbitrators ruled in favor of Saint-Vallier and placed the Seminary under his direct control. He then returned to Quebec.

=== 1691 to 1694 New France ===
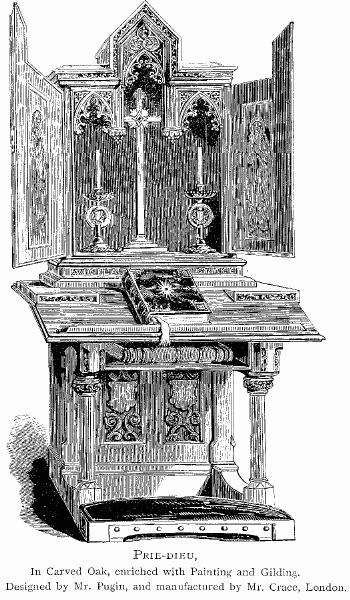
Example of a prie-dieu

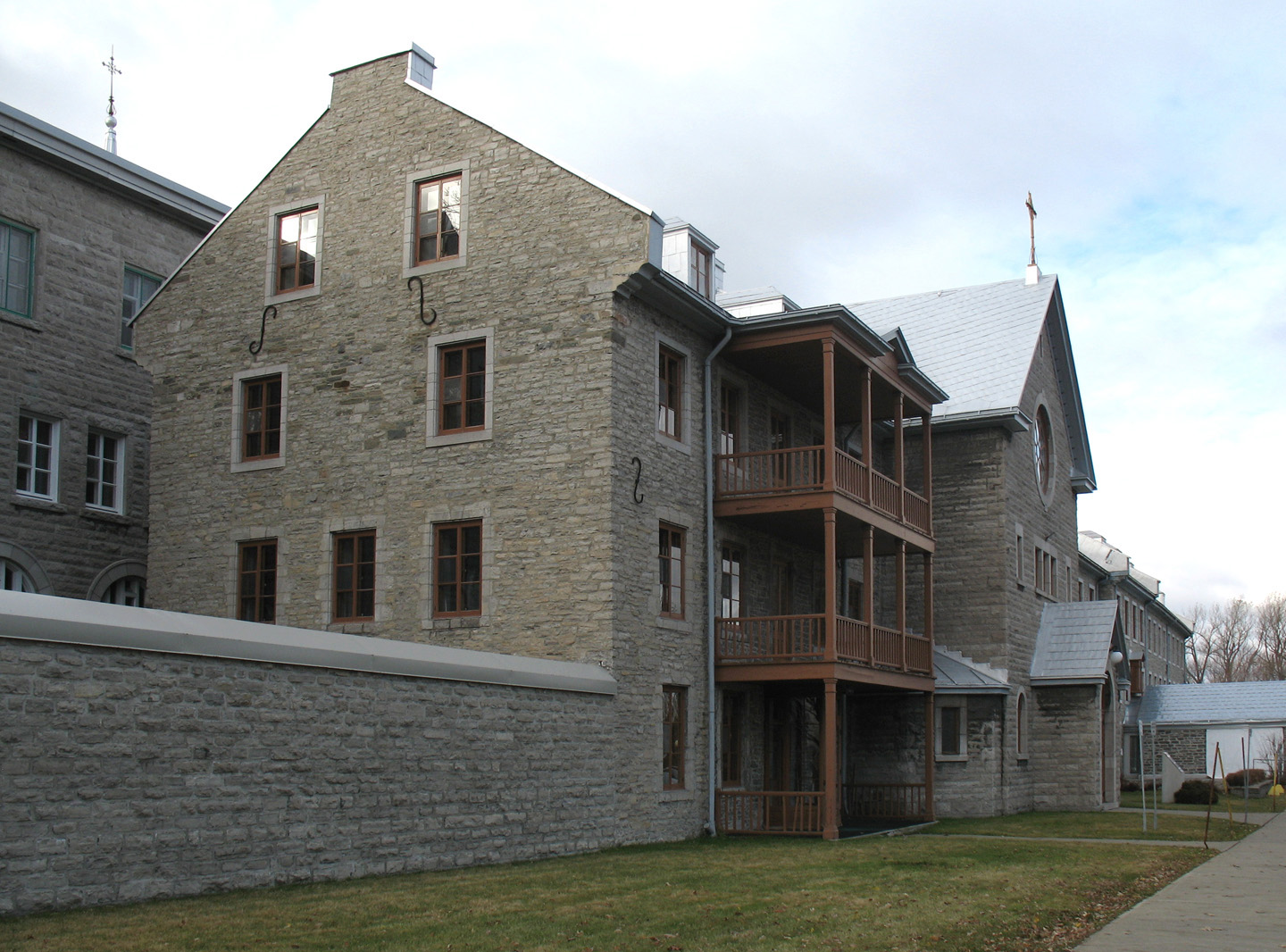
Hôpital général de Québec, Quebec City, Quebec (2008)

One of Saint-Vallier's main projects as bishop was the establishment of the Hôpital général de Québec (General Hospital of Quebec) in Quebec City in 1692. He had just acquired the Friary of Our Lady of the Angels (Notre-Dame-des-Anges) from the Recollects, who then relocated to the Place d'Armes in Quebec City. Saint-Vallier converted the friary building into a hospital for the poor.

In 1693, Saint-Vallier requested that the Canonesses of St. Augustine of the Mercy of Jesus, who had founded the Hôtel-Dieu de Québec, send some of its sisters to run the Hôpital général de Québec. Saint-Vallier opened the first synod in New France in March 1664.

On May 10, 1664, Saint-Vallier became embroiled in a conflict with Governor Louis de Buade de Frontenac over a prie-dieu, or prayer desk. This dispute occurred before an ordination ceremony at a church operated by the Recollet Order in Montreal. When Saint-Vallier entered the church, he found Frontenac's prie-dieu to be in a better spot than his own. The Recollect superior then moved it. When Frontenac's aides arrived, they moved his prie-dieu back to its original position. Saint-Vallier got angry and tried to force Frontenac to sit elsewhere; he refused and left the church.

The next day, Saint-Vallier ordered the Recollets to remove all the pre-dieus from the church. When Frontenac's soldiers put his back in the church, Saint-Vallier placed the church under interdict and closed it. After two months of interdict, the Recollets reopened the church. In retaliation, Saint-Vallier placed every religious priest in Montreal under interdict.

That same Frontenac announced plans to stage the Molière play Tartuffe in Quebec City. Saint-Vallier objected to the play, a farce that satirized excessive religious piety. The production was canceled.

Saint-Vallier in 1694 told the Congrégation de Notre-Dame religious order that they should combine with the Ursulines. However, the Congregation leadership refused. Saint-Vallier then present them with the Constitutions, a set of rules he wanted them to follow. The order was uncloistered, meaning that the religious sisters were active in teaching and nursing. The Constitutions restricted the sisters to a cloistered lifestyle under the bishop's control. The Constitutions also required dowry payments from the sisters and sworn obedience to the bishop.

=== 1694 to 1697 France ===
By the end of 1694, Louis XIV was receiving numerous complaints about Saint-Vallier from New France. The Seminary of Quebec, the religious orders, the civil authorities were all unhappy with his actions. The king then ordered Saint-Vallier to meet with him in Paris. During this meeting, Louis XIV asked Saint-Vallier to resign as bishop of Quebec, which he refused to do. Lacking any grounds on which to remove him a bishop, the king instead barred Saint-Vallier from returning to Quebec.

The Congrégation de Notre-Dame superiors in 1695 sent their objections to Constitutions to Saint-Vallier in France. Chastened by his meeting with Louis XIV, Saint-Valliers became more receptive to rule changes. In October 1695, the Council of State in Paris overruled the interdicts that he had placed on the religious priests in Montreal the previous year.

Three years later, in 1697, Saint-Vallier begged Louis XIV to change his mind, promising to be more prudent and moderate in his administration of the diocese. The king allowed him to travel back to Quebec.

=== 1697 to 1700 New France ===
After returning to Quebec, Saint-Vallier in 1697 built a palace, or residence, in Quebec for his clergy and as a place of hospitality. During the same year, he also established a monastery for religious sisters in Trois-Rivières, Quebec.

Saint-Vallier soon became embroiled in another major dispute. In 1698, the Seminary of Quebec requested permission from Saint-Vallier to send a mission to a village of the Tamaroa tribe in the Illinois colony. Seeking to improve his relationship with the Seminary, he agreed to the mission. The Jesuits strongly objected to the Seminary mission. They considered the Illinois colony to be part of their sphere of influence for evangelizing the Native American tribes and that included the Tamaroas.

This was not the only dispute that the Jesuits had with Saint-Vallier. He had forced them to close the primary school that they ran in their college and took over Notre-Dame-de-Lorette, a Jesuit church in the Saguenay Valley of Quebec. Saint-Vallier had also accused the Jesuits of teaching probabilism. In 1700, the Jesuits sent their grievances about Saint-Vallier to Louis XIV.

=== 1700 to 1704 France ===
In 1700, Saint-Vallier again traveled to France, to defend himself this time against the Jesuit complaints. Louis XIV upheld the Seminary of Quebec mission to Illinois. However, to placate the Jesuits, the king again forced Saint-Vallier, still bishop of Quebec, to remain in France.

A new dispute with the Jesuits broke out in 1702. At that time, the Jesuits and the priests of the Missions Étrangères were competing for the right to evangelize the Native Americans in Louisiana. To ensure their rights, they wanted Saint-Vallier, whose diocese included Louisiana, to appoint a Jesuit vicar general for that area. Saint-Vallier adamantly refused. The Jesuits decided to abandon their initiative there.

While in France, Saint Vallier published three written works; Catechism in 1702, Ritual in 1703, and Statuts, ordonnances et lettres pastorales de Monseigneur de Saint-Valier in 1703. Reverend Martin Bouvert, the Jesuit superior in New France, attacked the books as heretical, labeling them as a "...lapse into Arianism, Pelagianism, Jansenism, Lutheranism, and Calvinism". These attacks were particularly troubling to Saint-Vallier because Jansenism opposed to absolutism, It could be seen that Saint-Vallier was challenging the authority of Louis XIV, an absolute monarch.

Saint-Vallier asked the Sorbonne University in Paris to examine his three writings for heresy. The doctors of the Faculty of Theology declared Ritual and the Catechism to be perfectly orthodox. They then censured Bouvart for making these allegations against Saint-Vallier.

=== 1704 to 1709 England ===
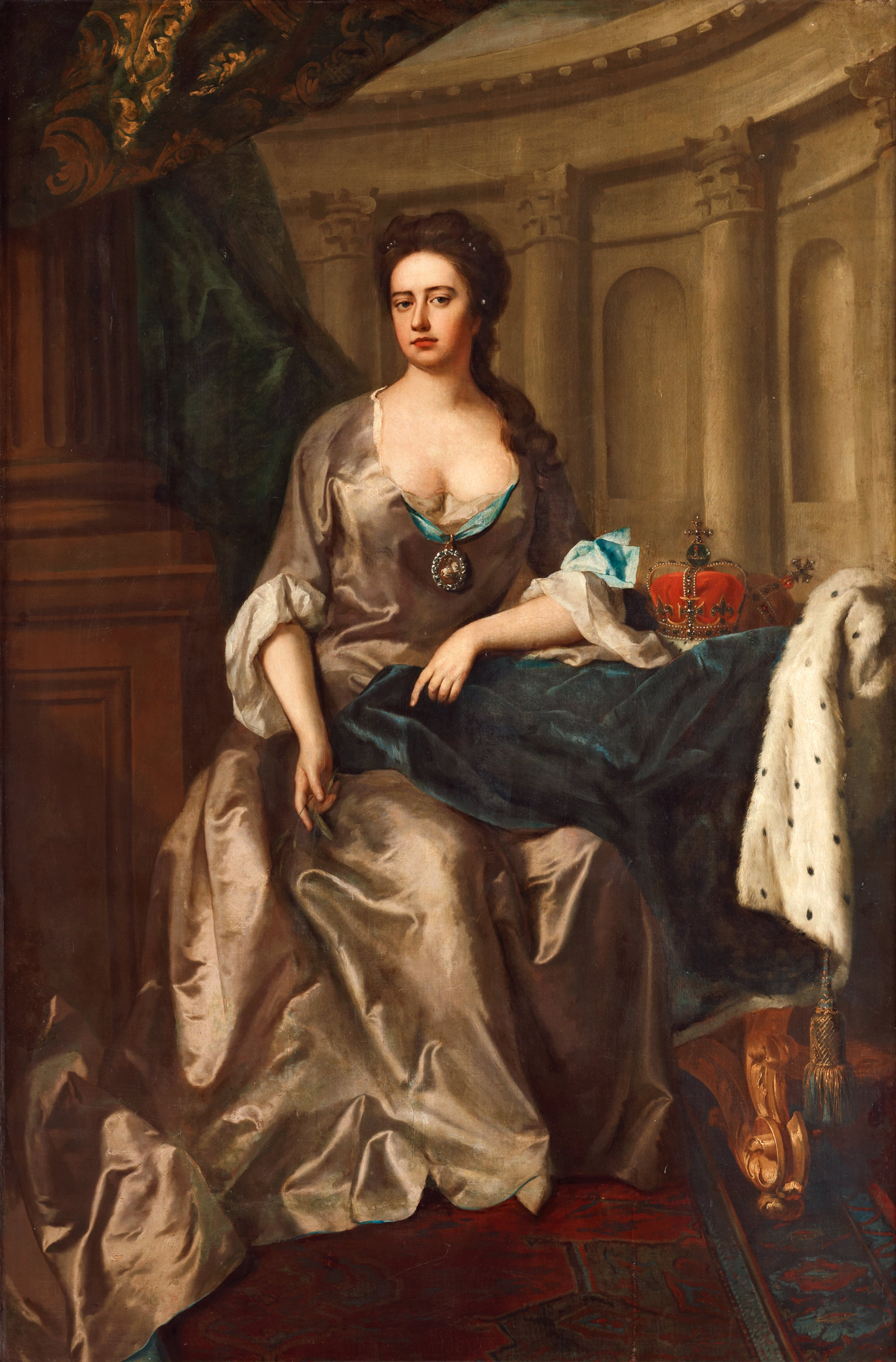
Queen Anne of England(early 1700s)

In 1704, Saint-Vallier sailed from La Rochelle, France to Quebec. At this time, France was at war with Great Britain in the War of the Spanish Succession. While Saint-Vallier's ship was passing through the Azores, it was captured by an English vessel and brought to England. The English placed Saint-Vallier under house arrest.

In return for Saint-Vallier's release, Anne, Queen of Great Britain, wanted the French to release the Baron de Méan, the dean of the Liège Cathedral in the Southern Netherlands. Louis XIV was reluctant to release de Méan as he was a key British ally. In addition, many of the king's advisors were glad to be rid of Saint-Vallier and all the problems he caused. During his four years in English captivity, Saint-Vallier's health gradually deteriorated.

=== 1709 to 1713 France ===
In 1709, Louis XIV finally agreed to the prisoner exchange and the English released Saint-Vallier. However, not wanting more conflicts in New France, the king again denied him permission to return to Quebec.

Conditions in New France soon changed Louis XIV's decision. After the death of Laval in 1708, the Diocese of Quebec was left without a bishop who could ordain clergy. Their ranks had been decimated by illness and the Catholic church was in decline throughout New France. After a near-fatal illness in 1711, Saint-Vallier re-edited in 1713 Ritual so as to cast away all doubts about his pretended Jansenist ideas. This book remained in use in the parishes until the middle of the 19th century.

Saint-Vallier wrote to Louis XIV about the dire state of the Catholic Church in the diocese and begged permission to return there. The king finally acquiesced in 1713.

=== 1713 to 1727 New France ===
In 1713, after 13 years in France and England, Saint-Vallier finally returned to Quebec. Now age 60 and in frail health, Saint-Vallier had no wish to precipitate any more quarrels with the civil and church authorities in New France. He gave up residence in the bishop's palace and moved into a room in the Hôpital général de Québec.

During the winter of 1713 to 1714, Saint-Vallier thought that he was going to die. During the upcoming years, Saint-Vallier made efforts to reconcile with the Jesuits and the other religious orders in New France. However, many of the parish priest resented his continued admonitions about living a simple life. Saint-Vallier continued to preach morality, condemn alcohol consumption and trading, and set up new parishes in the colonies.

When Governor Philippe de Rigaud, Marquis de Vaudreuil tried to infringe on the rights of the Catholic hierarchy, Saint-Vellier strongly opposed him. After Rigaud died in 1725, Saint-Vallier refused to allow churches to ring their bells.

During his later years, Saint-Vallier became increasing ascetic. He sold his possessions, including his shoes and bed. He fasted twice a week. Every day, he would hold a service at the hospital for the patients and visit them in the wards. As Timothy Pearson explained in Becoming holy in early Canada: "Charity, both the love one bore for God and the public acts of altruistic gift-giving […] became the prominent trope of holiness after 1650".

=== Death and legacy ===
Saint-Vallier died on December 26, 1727, in the Hôpital Général in Quebec City. His last words were: "Forget me, but do not forget my poor".

The Abbot August Gosselin described Saint-Vallier in the late 19th century:

"Especially by his great virtues and the holiness of his life, he is revealed in history with the halo of charity and disinterest: his memory shall be eternal"

== See also ==
- Michel Bertier
- Michel Sarrazin
