= Saint-Hilaire =

Saint-Hilaire may refer to:

== Places ==
=== France ===
==== Auvergne-Rhône-Alpes ====
- Saint-Hilaire, Allier, in the Allier department
- Saint-Hilaire, Haute-Loire, in the Haute-Loire department
- Saint-Hilaire, Isère, also known as Saint-Hilaire du Touvet, in the Isère department
- Saint-Hilaire-de-Brens, in the Isère department
- Saint-Hilaire-de-la-Côte, in the Isère department
- Saint-Hilaire-du-Rosier, in the Isère department
- Saint-Hilaire-Cusson-la-Valmitte, in the Loire department
- Saint-Hilaire-sous-Charlieu, in the Loire department
- Saint-Hilaire, Puy-de-Dôme, in the Puy-de-Dôme department
- Saint-Hilaire-la-Croix, in the Puy-de-Dôme department
- Saint-Hilaire-les-Monges, in the Puy-de-Dôme department

==== Bourgogne-Franche-Comté ====
- Saint-Hilaire, Doubs, in the Doubs department
- Saint-Hilaire-en-Morvan, in the Nièvre department
- Saint-Hilaire-Fontaine, in the Nièvre department

==== Brittany ====
- Saint-Hilaire-des-Landes, in the Ille-et-Vilaine department

==== Centre-Val de Loire ====
- Saint-Hilaire-de-Court, in the Cher department
- Saint-Hilaire-de-Gondilly, in the Cher department
- Saint-Hilaire-en-Lignières, in the Cher department
- Saint-Hilaire-sur-Yerre, in the Eure-et-Loir department
- Saint-Hilaire-sur-Benaize, in the Indre department
- Saint-Hilaire-la-Gravelle, in the Loir-et-Cher department
- Saint-Hilaire-les-Andrésis, in the Loiret department
- Saint-Hilaire-sur-Puiseaux, in the Loiret department
- Saint-Hilaire-Saint-Mesmin, in the Loiret department

==== Grand Est ====
- Saint-Hilaire-sous-Romilly, in the Aube department
- Saint-Hilaire-le-Grand, in the Marne department
- Saint-Hilaire-le-Petit, in the Marne department
- Saint-Hilaire-au-Temple, in the Marne department
- Saint-Hilaire-en-Woëvre, in the Meuse department

==== Hauts-de-France ====
- Saint-Hilaire-lez-Cambrai, in the Nord department
- Saint-Hilaire-sur-Helpe, in the Nord department
- Saint-Hilaire-Cottes, in the Pas-de-Calais department

==== Île-de-France ====
- Saint-Hilaire, Essonne, in the Essonne department

==== Normandy ====
- Saint-Hilaire-du-Harcouët, in the Manche department
- Saint-Hilaire-Petitville, in the Manche department
- Saint-Hilaire-de-Briouze, in the Orne department
- Saint-Hilaire-le-Châtel, in the Orne department
- Saint-Hilaire-sur-Erre, in the Orne department
- Saint-Hilaire-la-Gérard, in the Orne department
- Saint-Hilaire-sur-Risle, in the Orne department

==== Nouvelle-Aquitanie ====
- Barbezieux-Saint-Hilaire, a commune in the Charente department
- Saint-Hilaire-du-Bois, Charente-Maritime, in the Charente-Maritime department
- Saint-Hilaire-de-Villefranche, in the Charente-Maritime department
- Saint-Hilaire-les-Courbes, in the Corrèze department
- Saint-Hilaire-Foissac, in the Corrèze department
- Saint-Hilaire-Luc, in the Corrèze department
- Saint-Hilaire-Peyroux, in the Corrèze department
- Saint-Hilaire-Taurieux, in the Corrèze department
- Saint-Hilaire-le-Château, in the Creuse department
- Saint-Hilaire-la-Plaine, in the Creuse department
- Saint-Hilaire-d'Estissac, in the Dordogne department
- Saint-Hilaire-la-Palud, in the Deux-Sèvres department
- Saint-Hilaire-du-Bois, Gironde, in the Gironde department
- Saint-Hilaire-de-la-Noaille, in the Gironde department
- Saint-Hilaire-Bonneval, in the Haute-Vienne department
- Saint-Hilaire-les-Places, in the Haute-Vienne department
- Saint-Hilaire-la-Treille, in the Haute-Vienne department
- Saint-Hilaire-de-Lusignan, in the Lot-et-Garonne department

==== Occitania ====
- Saint-Hilaire, Aude, in the Aude department; possible site of discovery of sparkling wine
- Saint-Hilaire-de-Brethmas, in the Gard department
- Saint-Hilaire-d'Ozilhan, in the Gard department
- Saint-Hilaire, Haute-Garonne, in the Haute-Garonne department
- Saint-Hilaire-de-Beauvoir, in the Hérault department
- Saint-Hilaire, Lot, in the Lot department
- Saint-Hilaire-de-Lavit, in the Lozère department

==== Pays de la Loire ====
- Saint-Hilaire-de-Chaléons, in the Loire-Atlantique department
- Saint-Hilaire-de-Clisson, in the Loire-Atlantique department
- Saint-Hilaire-du-Maine, in the Mayenne department
- Saint-Hilaire-le-Lierru, in the Sarthe department
- Saint-Hilaire-la-Forêt, in the Vendée department
- Saint-Hilaire-des-Loges, in the Vendée department
- Saint-Hilaire-de-Loulay, in the Vendée department
- Saint-Hilaire-de-Riez, in the Vendée department
- Saint-Hilaire-de-Voust, in the Vendée department
- Saint-Hilaire-le-Vouhis, in the Vendée department

=== Canada ===
- St. Hilaire, New Brunswick, a former village, now part of Haut-Madawaska
- Saint-Hilaire Parish, New Brunswick
- Mont-Saint-Hilaire, Quebec, a city in the province of Quebec
  - Mont Saint-Hilaire, the mountain after which the city was named
- Saint-Hilaire-de-Dorset, Quebec, a parish in the province of Quebec

=== United States ===
- St. Hilaire, Minnesota, a city in Pennington County

== People ==
- Amable de Saint-Hilaire (1799–18??), French dramatist
- Augustin Saint-Hilaire (1799–1853), French botanist and traveler
- Caroline St-Hilaire (born 1969), Canadian politician
- Étienne Geoffroy Saint-Hilaire, (1772–1844), French zoologist
- Isidore Geoffroy Saint-Hilaire, (1805–1861), his son, also a zoologist
- Jean Henri Jaume Saint-Hilaire (1772–1845), French botanist
- Jules Barthélemy-Saint-Hilaire (1805–1895), French philosopher, journalist and statesman
- Kathia St. Hilaire (born 1995), American visual artist of Haitian descent
- Louis Vincent Le Blond de Saint-Hilaire, (1766–1809), French general
- Marcus St Hilaire (born 1977), English rugby league player

== See also ==
- Hilaire (disambiguation)
- Hilary of Poitiers or Saint Hilarius, 4th-century bishop and Church Father
- Pope Hilarius or Pope Hilary, 5th-century pope
- Hilary of Arles or Saint Hilarius, 5th-century bishop
- Saint Hilarion, anchorite
