= Saint-Hilaire-du-Bois =

Saint-Hilaire-du-Bois may refer to the following places in France:

- Saint-Hilaire-du-Bois, Charente-Maritime, in the Charente-Maritime département
- Saint-Hilaire-du-Bois, Gironde, in the Gironde département
- Saint-Hilaire-du-Bois, Maine-et-Loire, a former commune in the Maine-et-Loire département that is now a part of Vihiers
- Saint-Hilaire-du-Bois, Vendée, a former commune in the Vendée département that is now a part of La Caillère-Saint-Hilaire
