= Michel Bertier =

Michel Bertier (Berthier) (c. 1695 – 5 September 1740) was the surgeon-major of Quebec and was surgeon to the Hôtel-Dieu there as well.

Bertier had frequent professional contact with Michel Sarrazin who was surgeon-major of the colonial regular troops. They both attended at the death of Bishop Jean-Baptiste de La Croix de Chevrières de Saint-Vallier.
