= Pierre Baudeau =

Pierre Baudeau (1643–1708) was a surgeon-major in New France where he arrived in 1692, replacing Michel Sarrazin in that position.

It is known from the writings of Governor Frontenac that Baudeau was highly regarded by him. He was active at the Hôtel-Dieu de Québec during his service in New France.
