= Notre-Dame-des-Victoires Church =

Notre-Dame-des-Victoires
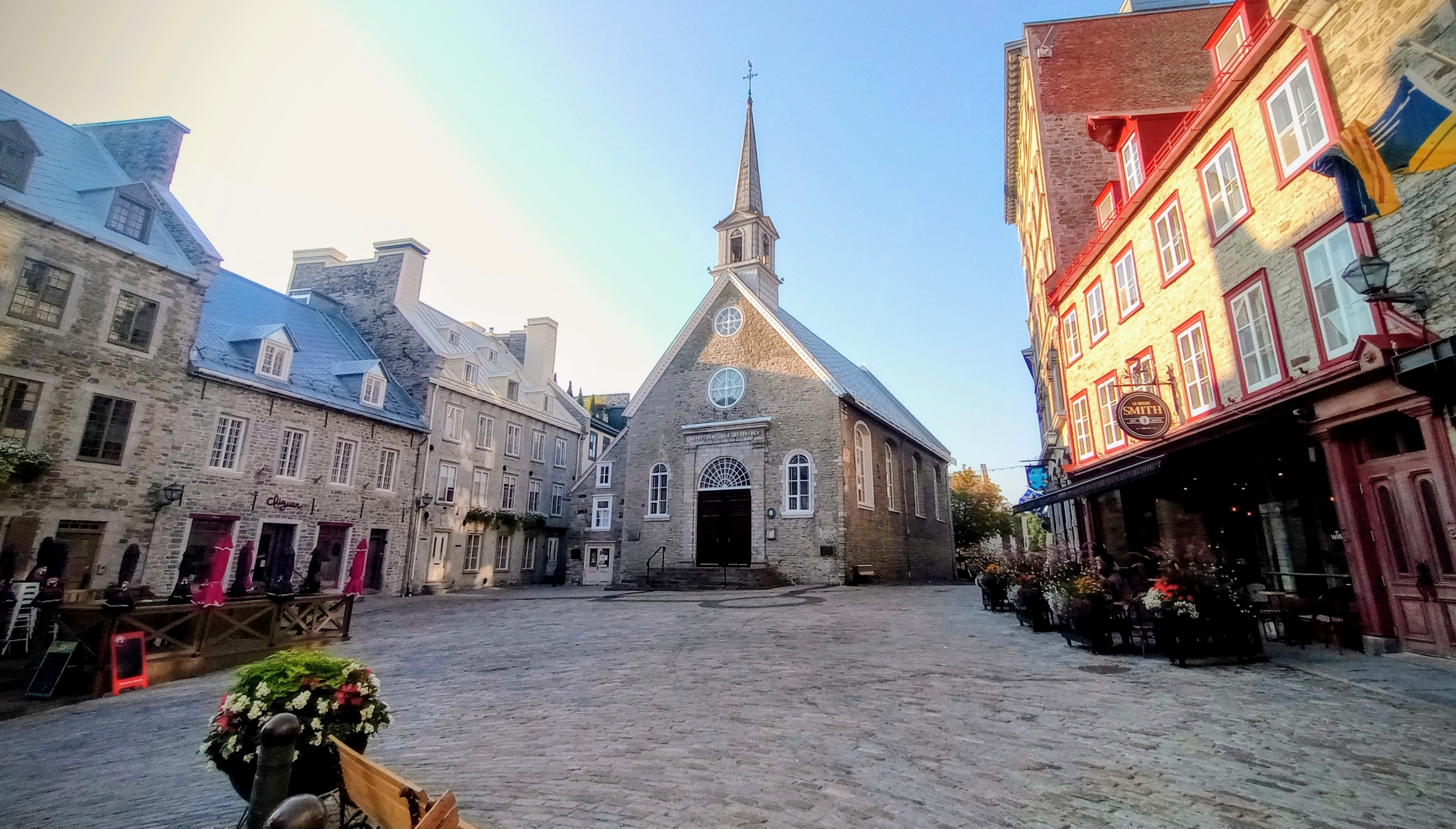
- Notre-Dame-des-Victoires
- 46.8128°N 71.2027°W
- Location: 32, rue Sous-le-Fort; Quebec City, Quebec; G1K 4G7
- Country: Canada
- Denomination: Roman Catholic
- Website: www.notre-dame-de-quebec.org/notre-dame-des-victoires-church

History
- Status: Active
- Founded: 1687 -1723
- Consecrated: 1723

Architecture
- Style: Colonial French

Administration
- Province: Canada

National Historic Site of Canada
- Official name: Notre-Dame-des-Victoires Church National Historic Site of Canada
- Designated: 1988

Patrimoine culturel du Québec
- Type: Classified heritage immovable
- Designated: 1929

Notre-Dame-des-Victoires (French pronunciation: [nɔtʁə dam de viktwaʁ]) is a small Roman Catholic stone church on Place Royale in the lower town of Old Quebec City. Construction was started in 1687 on the site of Champlain's habitation and was completed in 1723. The church is one of the oldest in North America.

== History ==
Notre-Dame-des-Victoires was built atop the ruins of Champlain's first outpost. Architect Hilaire Bernard de La Rivière was the builder. Originally dedicated to l'Enfant Jésus, it received the name Notre-Dame-de-la-Victoire (Our Lady of Victory) following the Battle of Quebec of 1690, in which an English expedition commanded by William Phips was forced to retreat. In 1711, its name was changed again, to Notre-Dame-des-Victoires (Our Lady of Victories), after bad weather sank much of a British fleet commanded by Hovenden Walker and bound for an attack on the city.

The church was largely destroyed by the British bombardment that preceded the Battle of the Plains of Abraham in September 1759. A complete restoration of the church was finished in 1816. Architect François Baillairgé led the restoration work.

The church, which was listed as a historic monument in 1929, remains a popular tourist attraction within the city, as well as a place of worship. It has undergone extensive restoration in recent decades, to restore its colonial French character. It was designated a National Historic Site of Canada in 1988 and plaqued in 1992.

In 2002, the church served as a filming location for Catch Me If You Can to represent a village in France.

== Interior ==
A model of the Brézé, the ship commanded by the marquis of Tracy, can be seen inside the church.

== Gallery ==
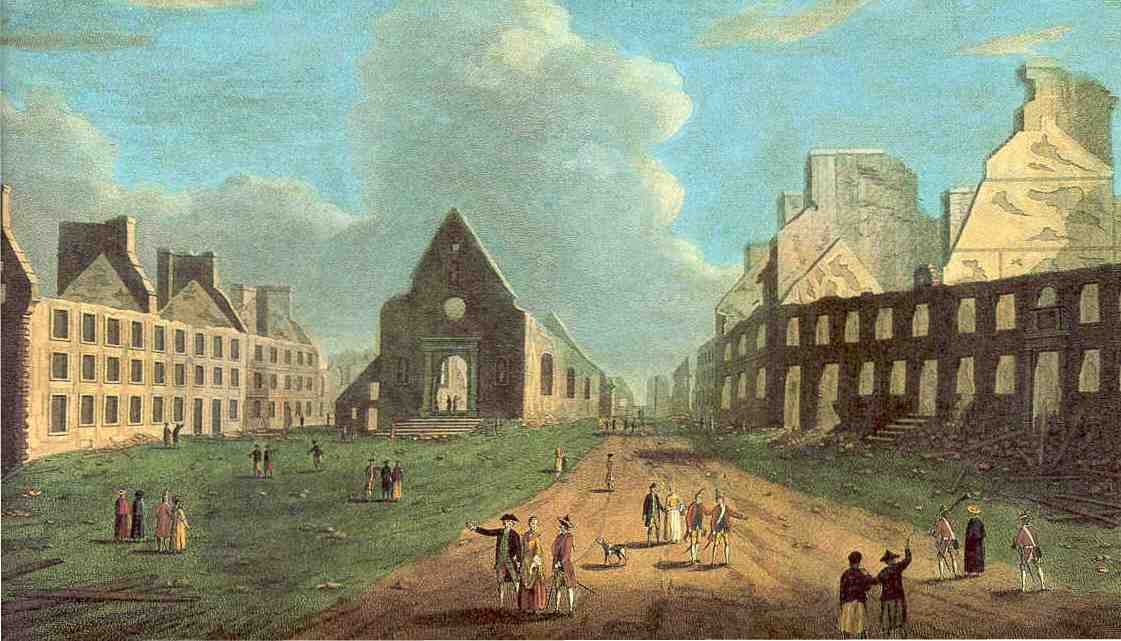
Notre-Dame-des-Victoires, 1759

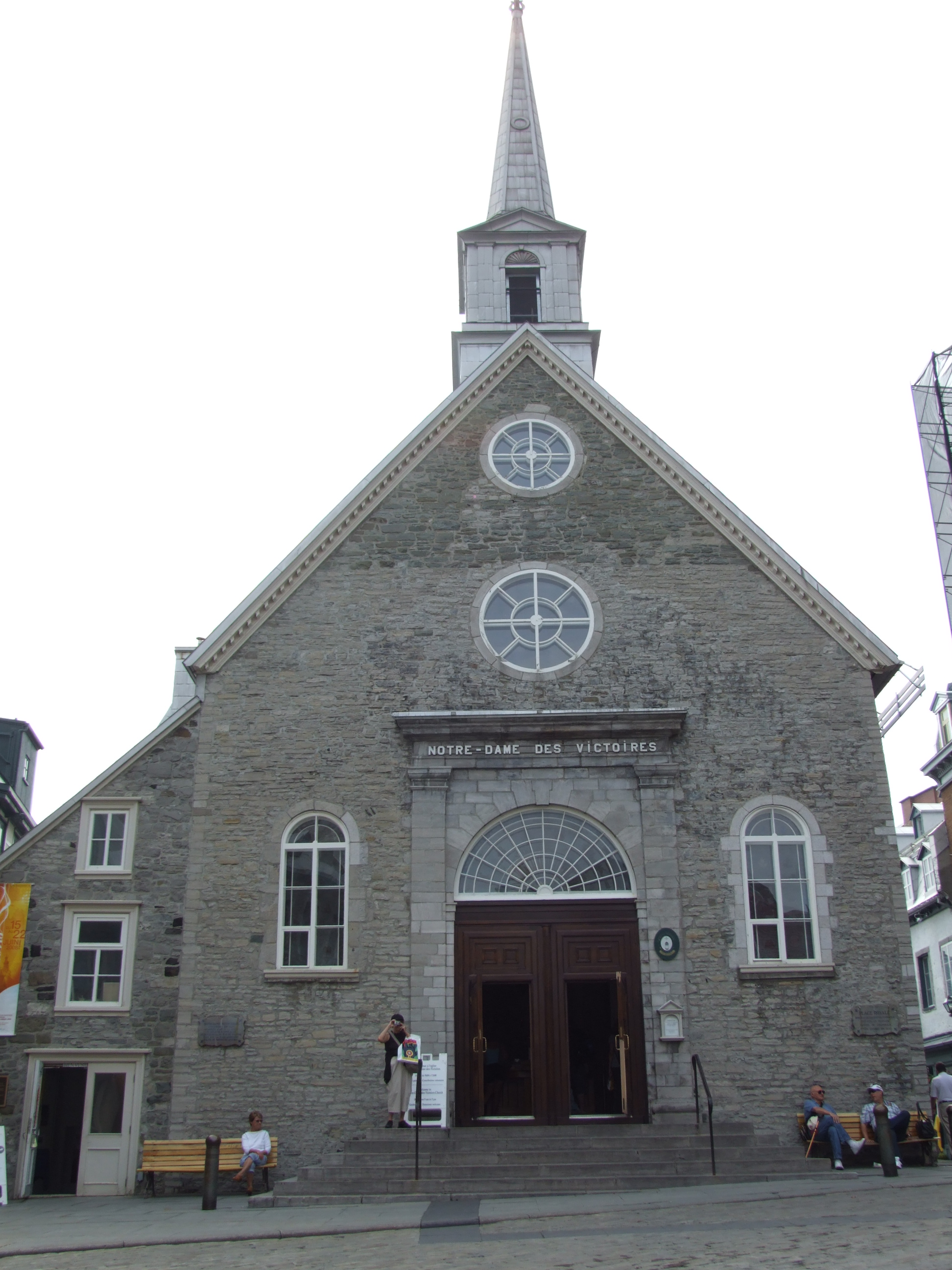
Front entrance

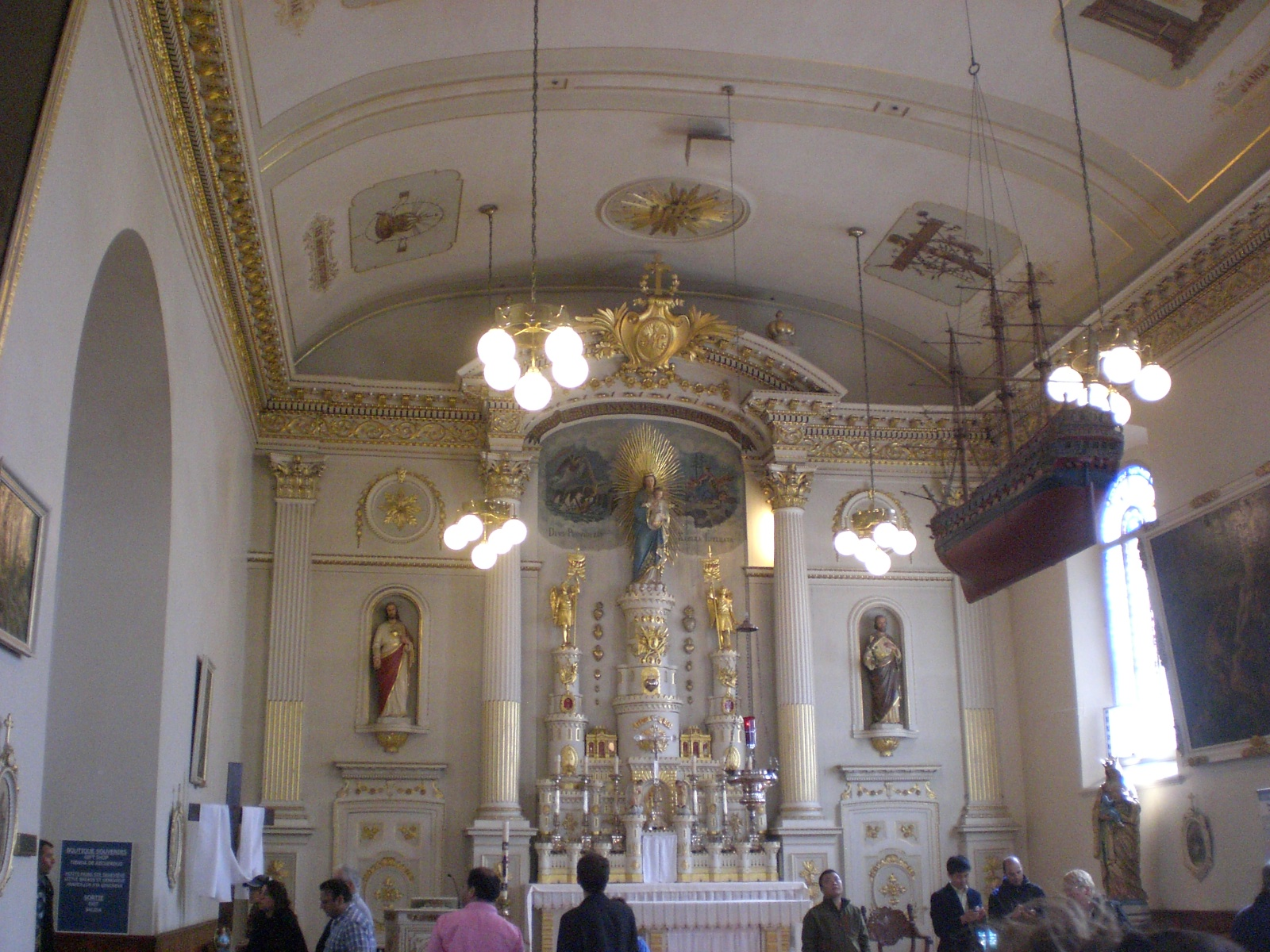
Interior

Exterior
