= Géologique de Normandie-Maine Regional Nature Reserve =

Regional nature reserve and fossil site in Normandie, France

- IUCN category IV (habitat/species management area)
- Interactive map of Géologique de Normandie-Maine Regional Nature Reserve
- Location: Orne, France
- Nearest city: Saint-Hilaire-la-Gérard
- Coordinates: 48.5873°N 0.042484°E
- Area: 0.37 ha (0.91 acres)
- Established: 18 December 2009
- Governing body: Normandie-Maine Regional Natural Park

Normandie-Maine Geologic Formation
- Stratigraphic range: Katian–Hirnantian
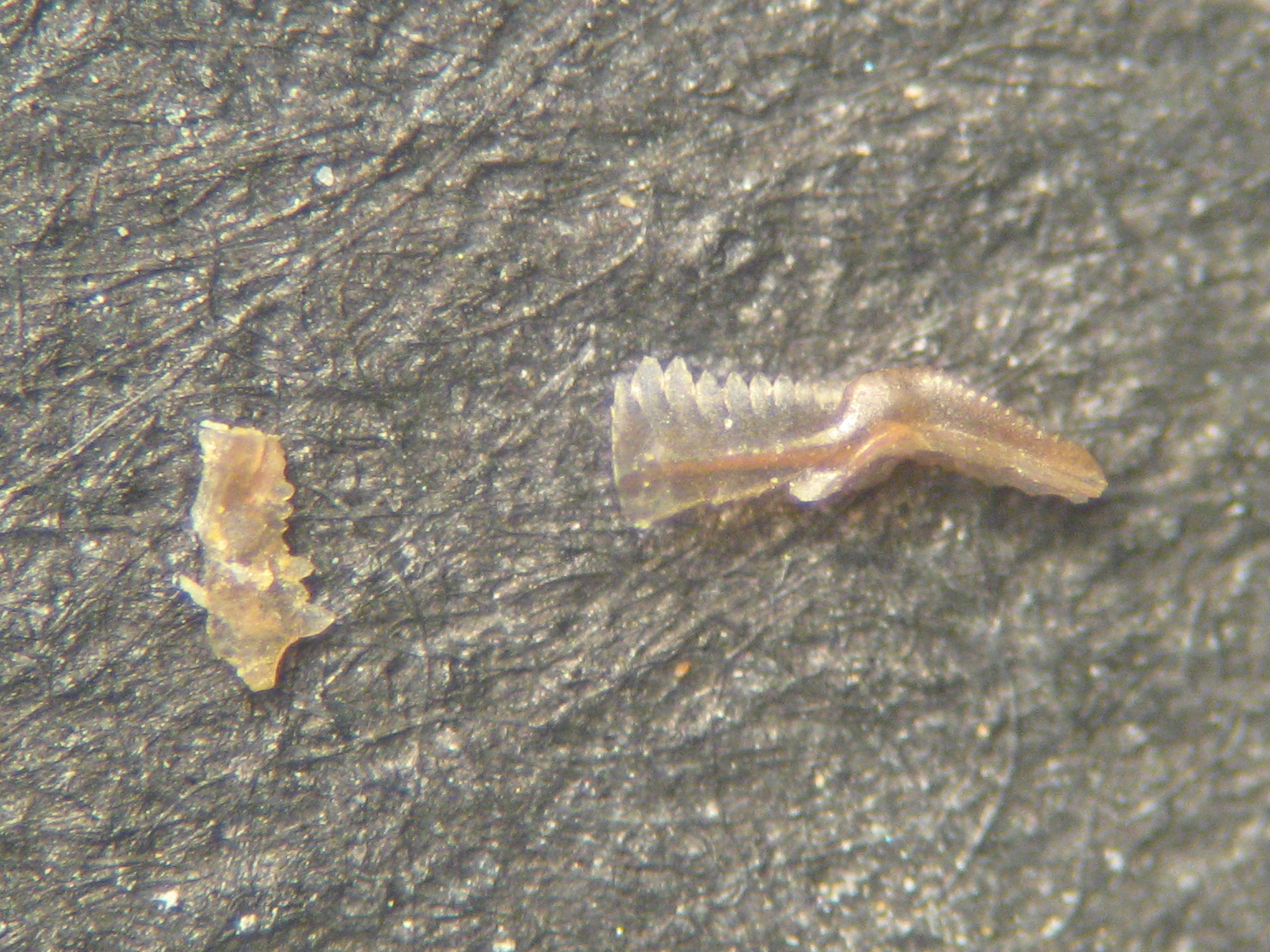
- Conodont microfossils
- Type: Fossil site

Lithology
- Primary: Limestone

Location
- Coordinates: 48.5873°N 0.042484°E
- Region: Normandy
- Country: France

Type section
- Named for: Normandy-Maine
- Géologique de Normandie-Maine Regional Nature Reserve (France)

The Géologique de Normandie-Maine Regional Nature Reserve (RNR216) is a geological regional nature reserve located in the commune of Mortrée part of the Normandie region. Established in 2009, it spreads over 0.37 hectares and protects an extraction site of Ordovician limestone, renowned for its microfossils of conodonts. By its size, it is the third smallest regionale nature reserve in France.

== Location ==
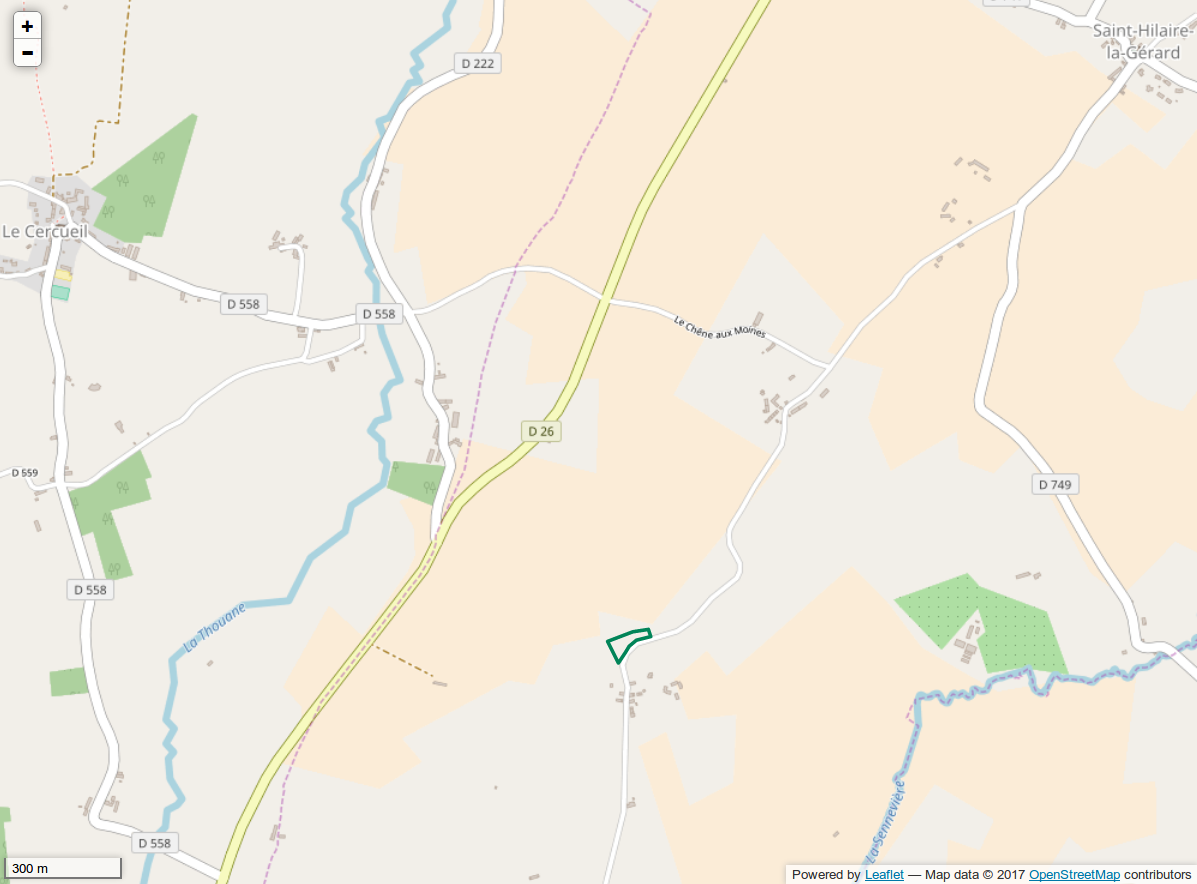
Surroundings of the nature reserve.

The territory of the nature reserve is located in the Orne department, in the domain of the commune Saint-Hilaire-la-Gérard, inside the Normandie-Maine Regional Natural Park. It comprise the site of the Carrière des Vaux, a small abandoned Ordovician limestone quarry. The site has an altitude of 245 m.

== History of the site and reserve ==
The site is known since the end of the XIXth century, thanks to the works of Alexandre Bigot, and is known for its heritage value since the 1990s. Extraction ceased at the turn of the XXth century. A regional inventory of the geological patrimony in 2007 allowed to launch the idea of the creation of a nature reserve. Finally, the death of its landlady in 2008 allowed the Normandie-Maine Regional Natural Park to buy the site.

== Ecology (biodiversity, ecological interest, etc.) ==
The interest of the site is mostly geological. It consists of the presence of microfossils of conodonts, which enabled its biostratigraphic datation and conferred to the site its national interest. It is scheduled that other sites rejoin the regional nature reserve in the future.

=== Geology ===
The site belongs to the eastern part of the Armorican Massif and is located in the northern flank of the syncline of Sées. The inclination of the layers present an average dip of 40 degrees towards the south. In the limestone levels of the quarry, joints facilitating the cutting of blocks can be observed.

=== Flaura ===
The vascular flora, studied in 2009, count a hundred of species typicals of the underwood. One of them is considered rare, the Plymouth pear. Other plants includes the wayfarer, the false-brome, the grey sedge, the woodland hawthorn, the lizard orchid...

=== Fauna ===
5 species of mammals, 20 species of birds and 34 species of insects are known on the site.

== Touristic and educational interest ==
Parts of the site are opened to the public, who can observe the limestone blocks still bearing conodont microfossils.

== Administration, management plan, regulations ==
The nature reserve is managed by the Normandie-Maine Regional Natural Park. Its management plan covers the period 2012–2019.

=== Tools and legal status ===
The nature reserve was established after deliberation the 18 December 2009. The site is located near the Natura 2000 "Haute vallée de l'Orne et affluents".
