= Mortrée =

- Commune
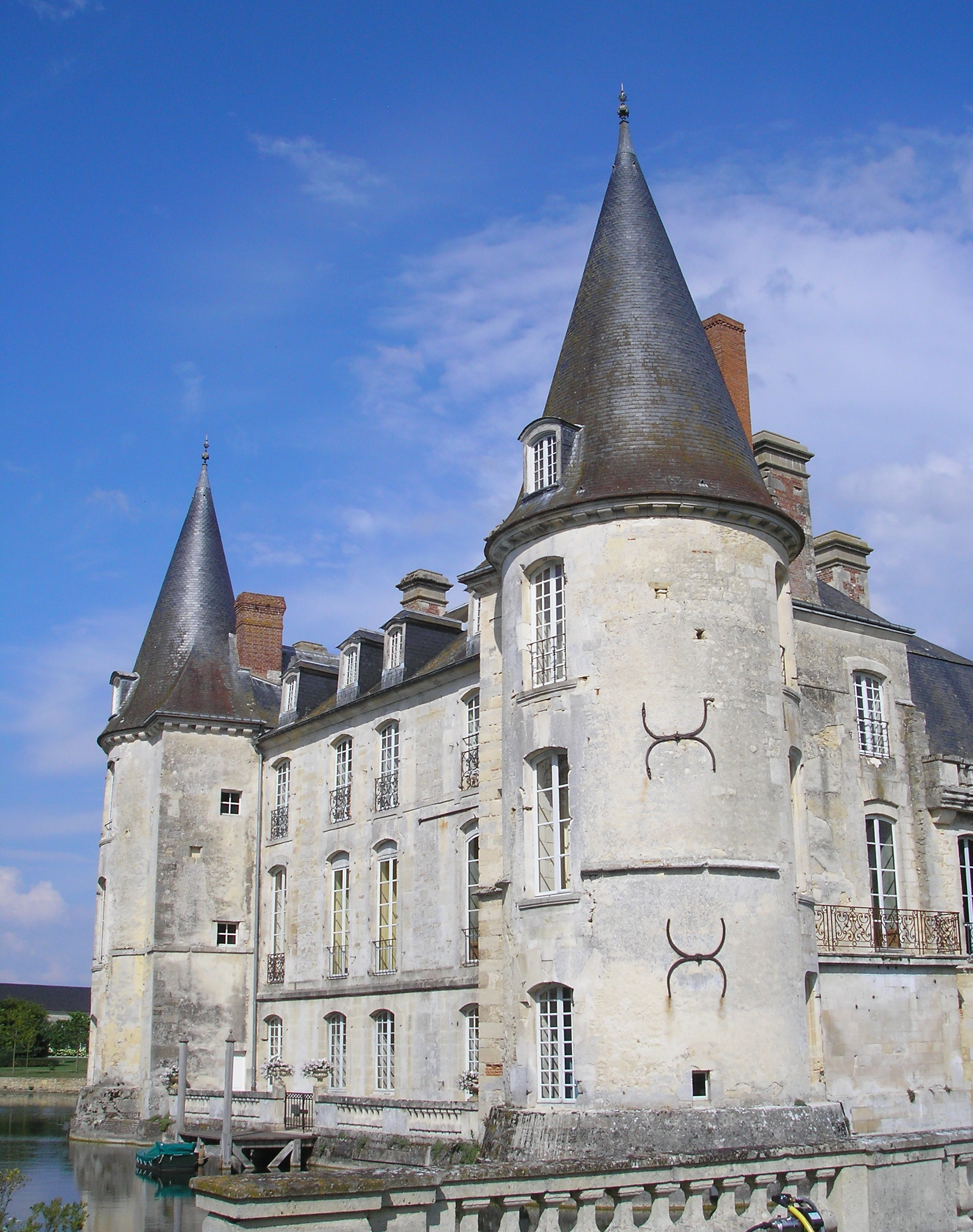
- The chateau in Mortrée
- Location of Mortrée
- Location within France Location within Normandy
- Coordinates: 48°38′25″N 0°04′44″E
- Country: France
- Region: Normandy
- Department: Orne
- Arrondissement: Alençon
- Canton: Sées
- Intercommunality: Sources de l'Orne

Government
  - Mayor (2021–2026): Reine-Marie Puitg
- Area^{1}: 32.26 km^{2} (12.46 sq mi)
- Elevation: 173 m (568 ft)
- Highest elevation: 277 m (909 ft)
- Lowest elevation: 161 m (528 ft)
- Population (2023): 1,115
  - Density: 34.56/km^{2} (89.52/sq mi)
- Time zone: UTC+01:00 (CET)
  - Summer (DST): UTC+02:00 (CEST)
- INSEE/Postal code: 61294 /61570
- ^{1} French Land Register data, which excludes lakes, ponds, glaciers > 1 km^{2} (0.386 sq mi or 247 acres) and river estuaries.

Mortrée (French pronunciation: [mɔʁtʁe]) is a commune in the Orne department in north-western France. On 1 January 2019, the former commune Saint-Hilaire-la-Gérard was merged into Mortrée.

== Geography ==
The commune of Mortrée is made up of the following villages and hamlets, Mortrée, Méhéran, La Grande Fosse and Saint-Hilaire-la-Gérard.

Mortrée has a total of seven water courses running through it, three rivers Orne, Senneviere and Thouane. The other four watercourses are all streams, la Gironde, The Ponts Besnard, La Forêt & The Renardieres.

Parts of the commune is within the Normandie-Maine Regional Natural Park and Forêt d'Écouves.

Mortrée, along with another 65 communes, is part of a 20,593 hectare, Natura 2000 conservation area, called the Haute vallée de l'Orne et affluents.

== Notable buildings and places ==
- La carrière des Vaux is a Regional Nature Reserve that is 0.37 hectares in area, making it the smallest nature reserve in France. The reserve was a former quarry that contains many fossils from Conodonts that are naked to the human eye.

=== National heritage sites ===
The Commune has 3 buildings and areas listed as a Monument historique.

- Château d'O a 15th-century castle built by Jean d'O, captain of the Scottish guard of François I.
- Logis a 15th-century house used for accommodation, listed as a monument in 1995.
- Saint-Pierre Church a 19th-century church, listed as a monument in 2006.

== Notable people ==
- René Hardy (1911-1987) a French Resistance member was born here.

== Heraldry ==
| Arms of Mortrée | The arms of Mortrée are blazoned : Ermine, on a chief indented gules an escallop Or. |

== Town twinning ==
Mortrée is twinned with towns are:

- Shrivenham, Oxfordshire – England.

== See also ==
- Communes of the Orne department
