= Place Royale, Quebec City =

Place Royale
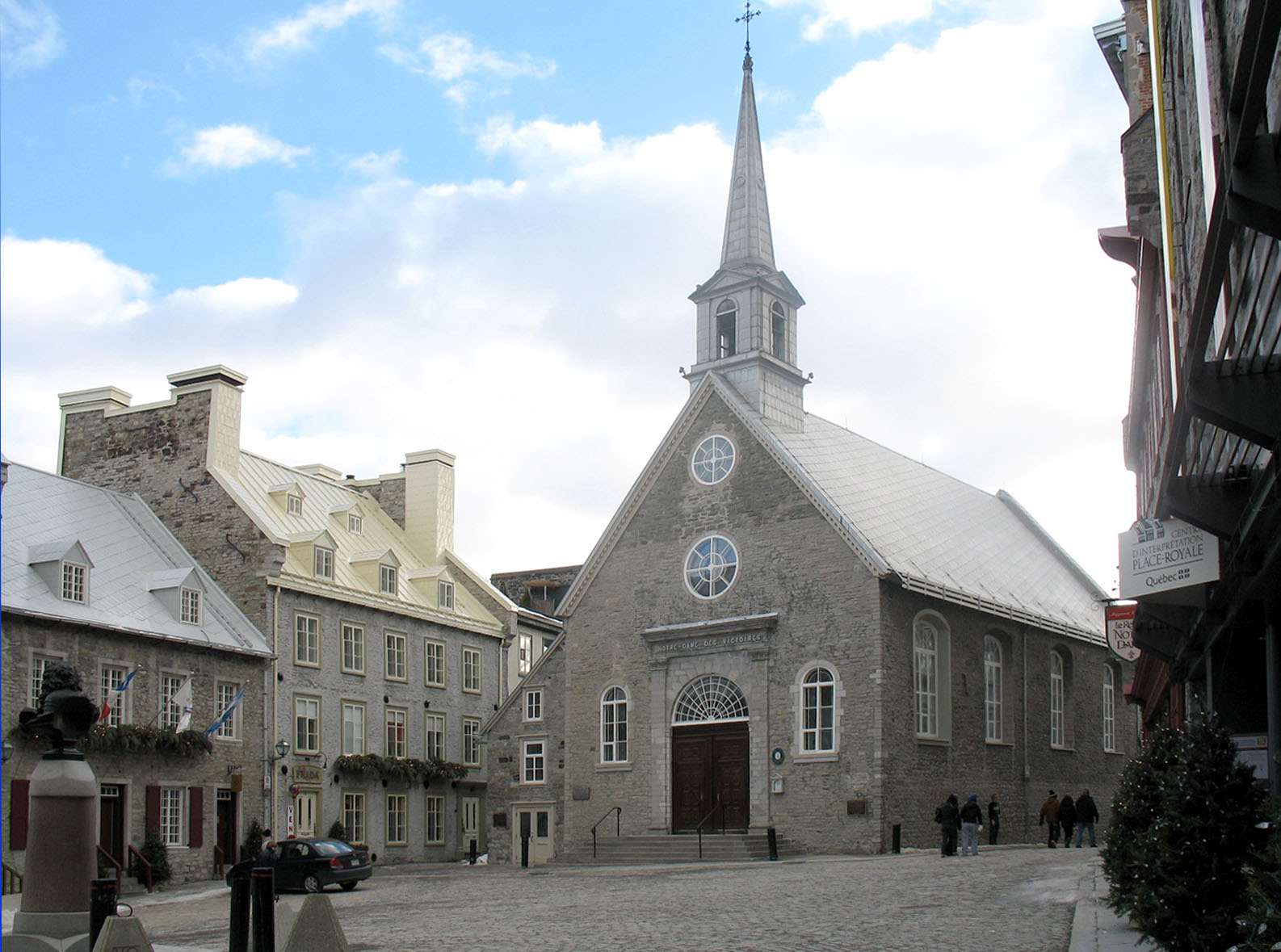
- View of Place Royale looking south towards Notre-Dame-des-Victoires
- Architectural style: New France Vernacular
- Location: Quebec City, Canada
- Interactive map of Place Royale
- Coordinates (Canada): 46.8128°N 71.2027°W

UNESCO World Heritage Site
- Part of: Historic District of Old Québec
- Criteria: cultural: (iv), (vi)
- Reference: 300
- Inscription: 1985 (9th Session)

Place Royale (French pronunciation: [plas ʁwajal], meaning "Royal Square") is a historic square in the centre of Quebec City, Quebec, Canada.

== History ==
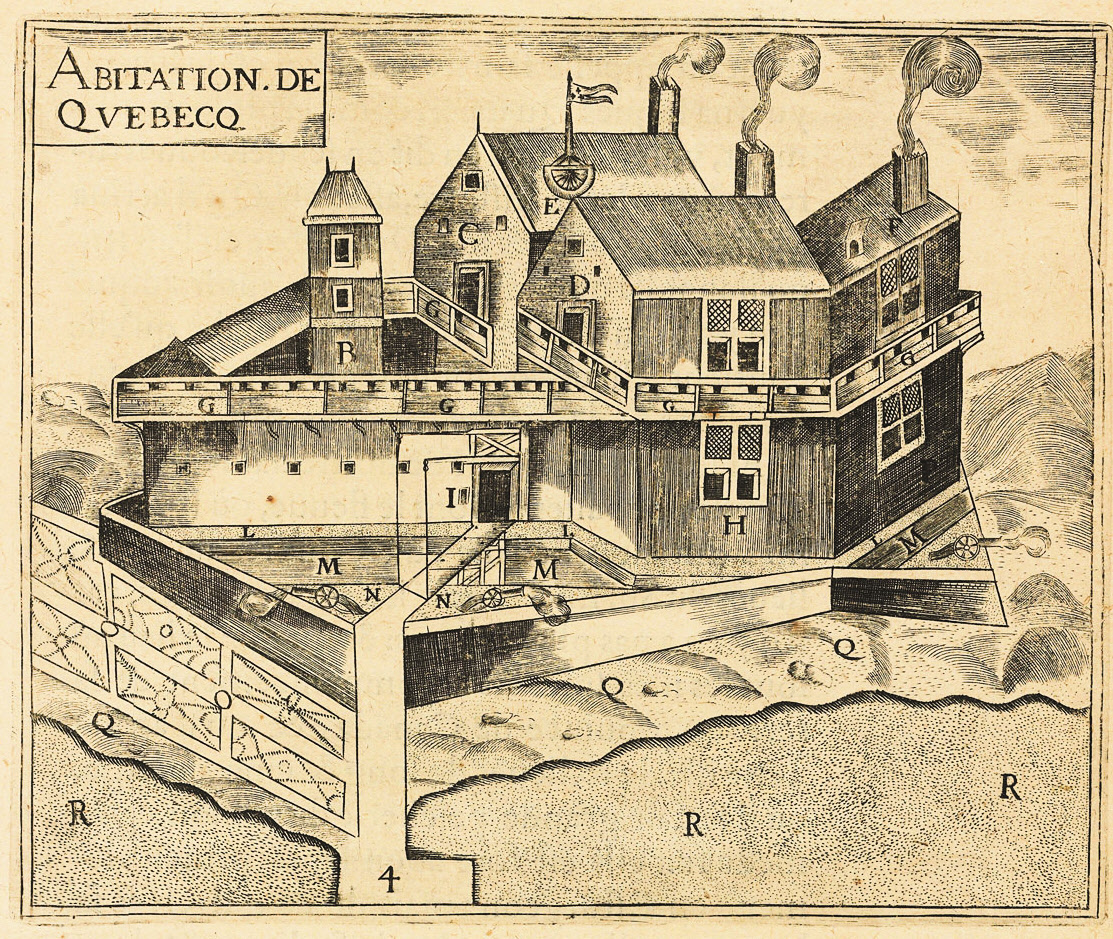
Champlain Habitation, future site of Place Royale

In 1608, the French explorer Samuel de Champlain established the settlement that would become Quebec City on the site of Place Royale. For this reason, the square is often referred to as "the cradle of French civilization in America."

By the 1620s, the square hosted the city's first market, inspiring its original name of Market Square (French: Place du Marché). The settlement would develop rapidly during the 17th century, forming what is now called the Lower Town (French: Basse-Ville) of Quebec City. A fire in 1682 ravaged the wood structures of the settlement, prompting the construction of new stone buildings that would establish the architectural style of the square. In 1686, a bust of King Louis XIV was erected in the square by Intendant Jean Bochart de Champigny, inspiring its current name of Place Royale.

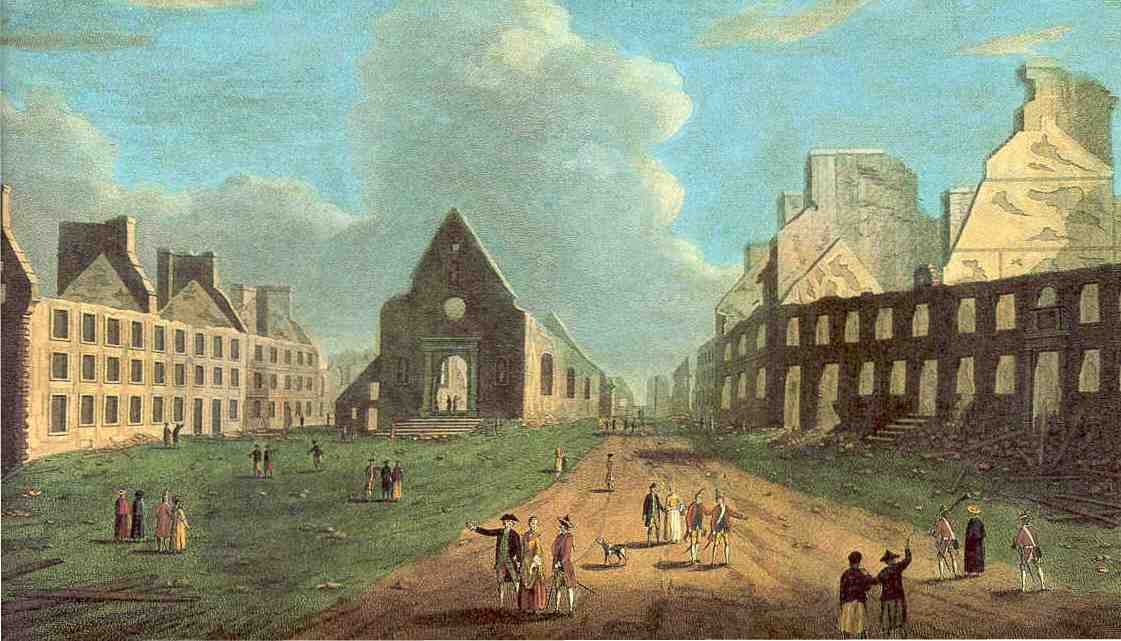
View of Place Royale following the British bombardment during the Battle of the Plains of Abraham

Place Royale would experience significant destruction at the hands of the British Army of General James Wolfe in the 1759 Battle of the Plains of Abraham, a pivotal battle in the Seven Years' War.

The advent in the 19th century of the industrial revolution, which favored metal over wood, and the growth of the port of Montreal led Place Royale to lose its role as a commercial hub.

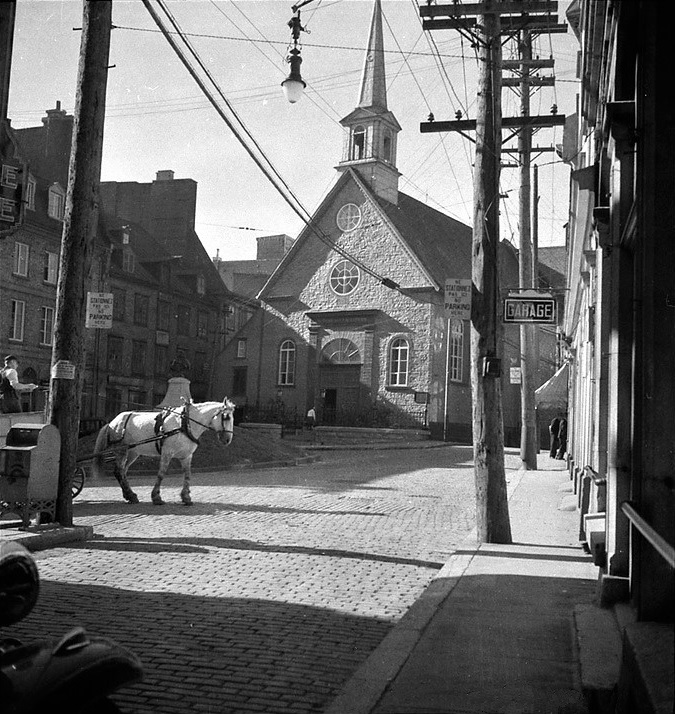
Place Royale in 1933, prior to restoration

A restoration project in the second half of the 20th Century removed additions made to the square from the period of British control onwards, returning to the space its original French colonial character and architecture. The project, started in 1970, cost $20 million ($166 million in 2025).

== In popular culture ==
Place Royale was used as a stand-in for Montrichard, France in the 2002 Steven Spielberg film Catch Me If You Can.
