= Hilaire Pader =

French painter, poet and translator

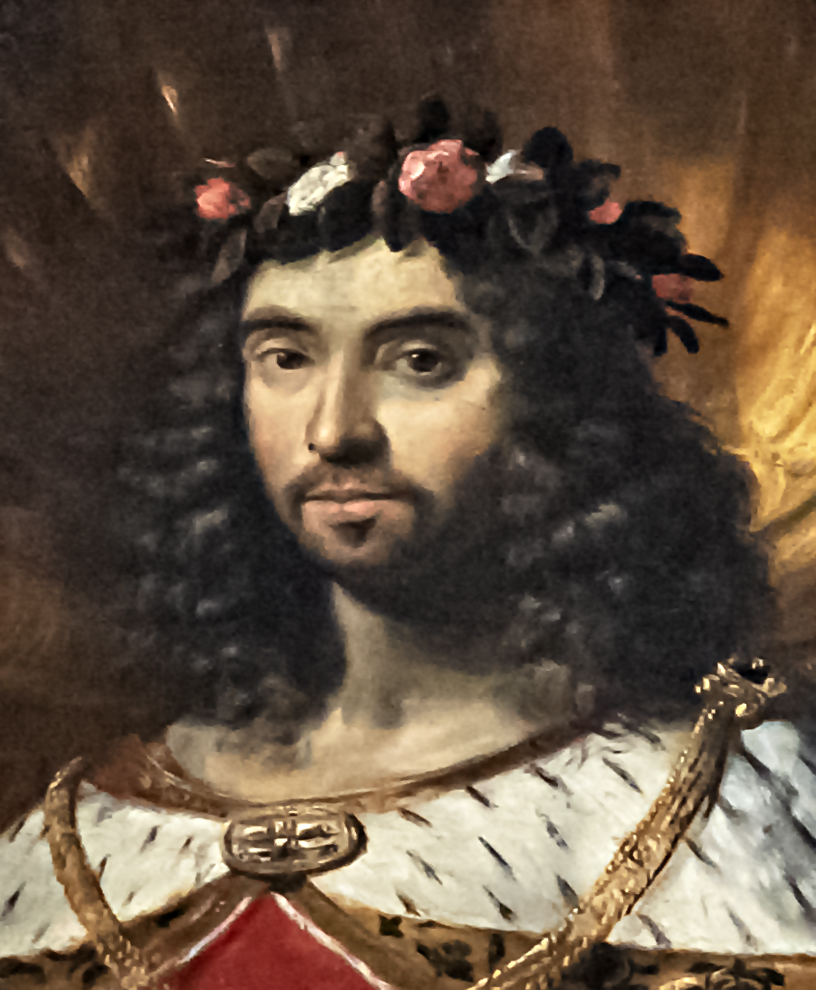
- Born: February 24, 1607; Toulouse, France
- Died: August 14, 1677 (aged 70)
- Occupations: Painter, poet, translator

Hilaire Pader (1607–1677) was a French painter, poet and translator. He translated a book of art history by Italian critic Gian Paolo Lomazzo in 1649. He authored La Peinture parlante in 1653 and Le Songe énigmatique de la peinture universelle in 1658. He was a personal friend of sculptor Pierre Affre.

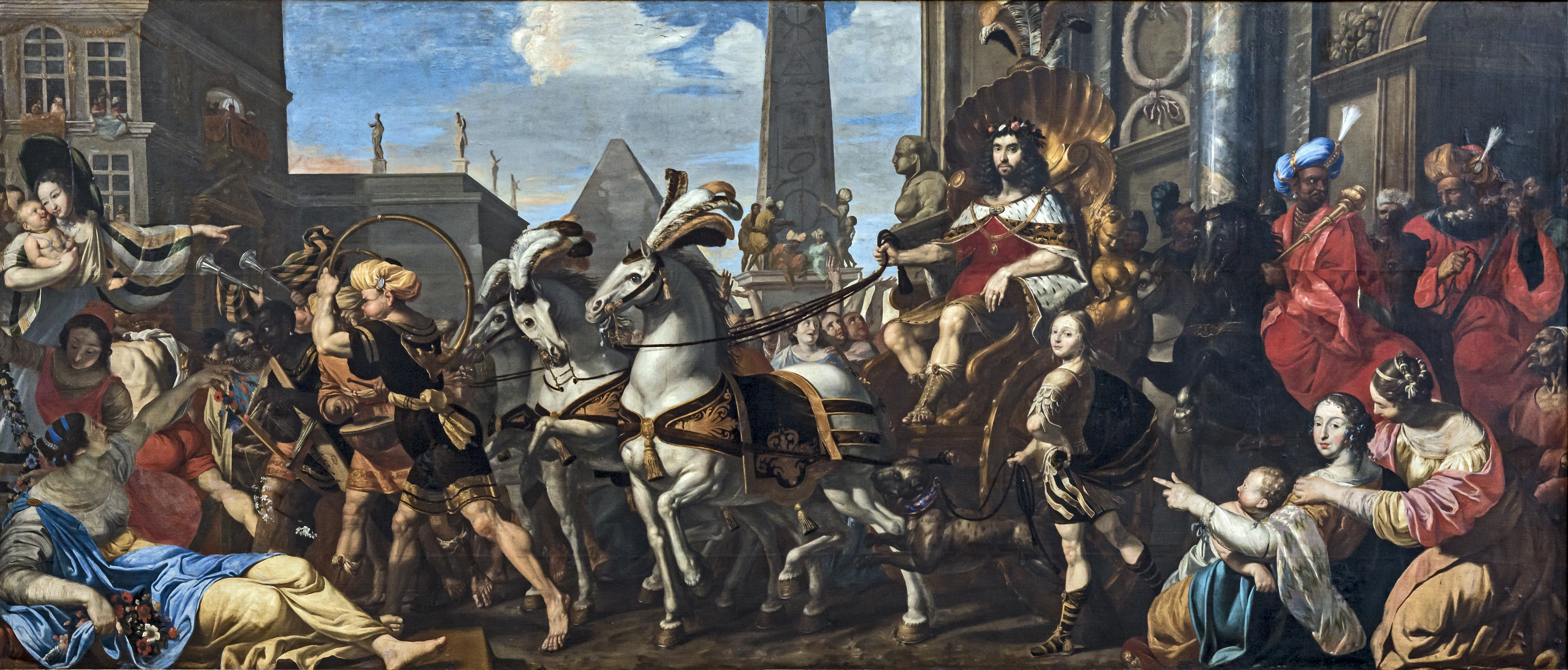
Le Triomphe de Joseph Toulouse Cathedral

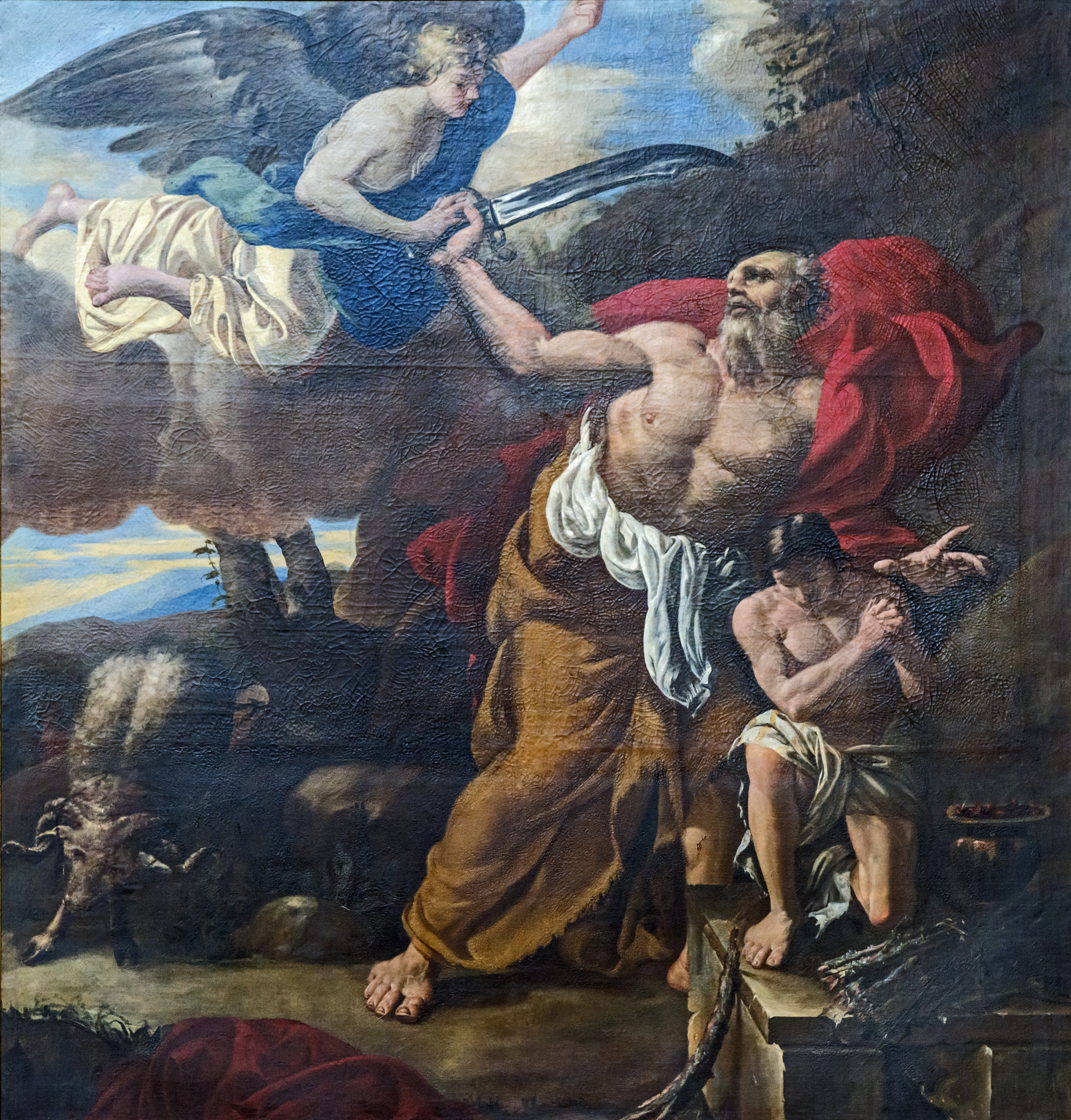
Le Sacrifice d'Abraham Toulouse Cathedral

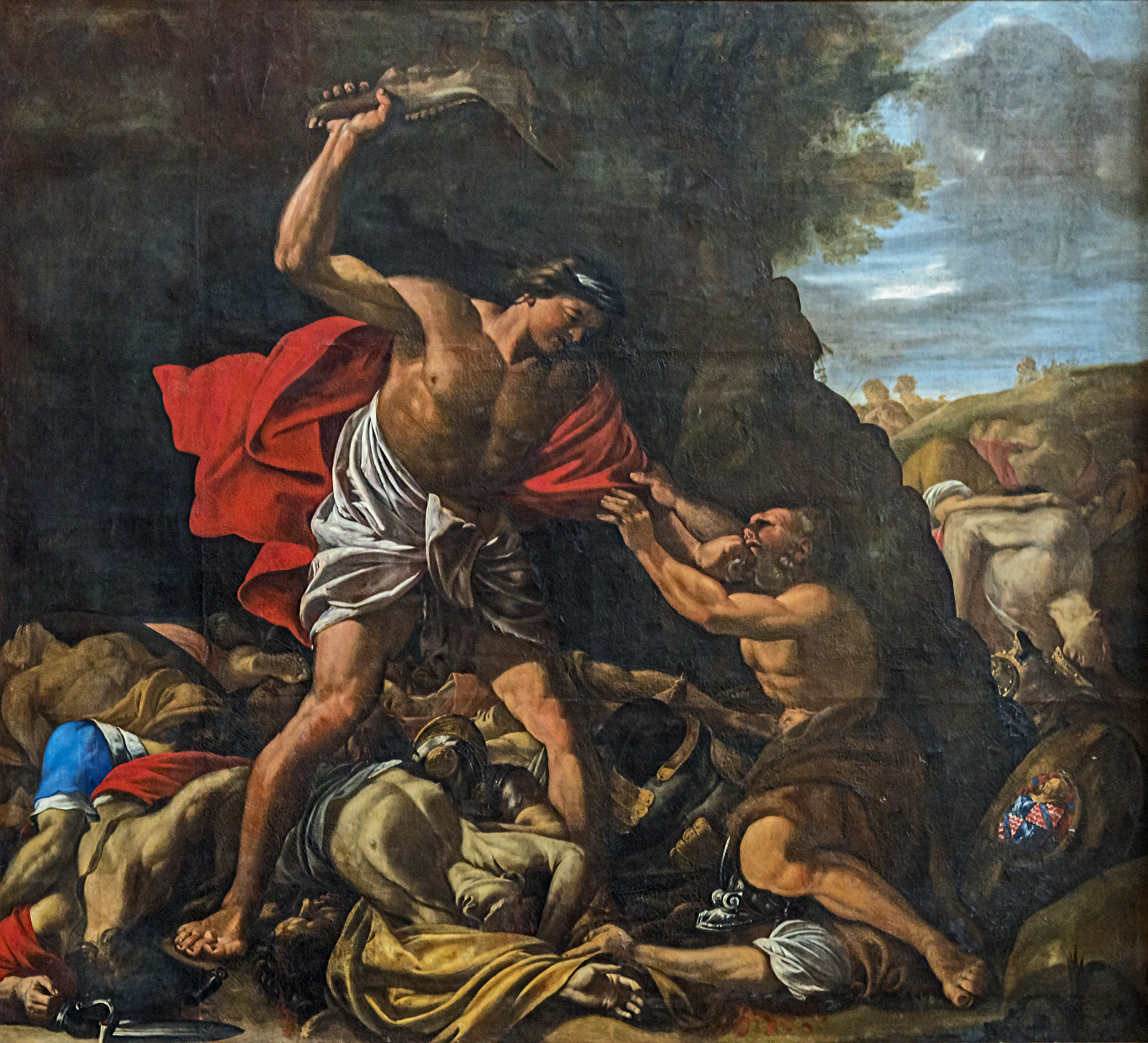
Samson massacrant les Philistins
Toulouse Cathedral
