= Saint-Hilaire-la-Gérard =

- Part of Mortrée
- Location of Saint-Hilaire-la-Gérard
- Location within France Location within Normandy
- Coordinates: 48°36′07″N 0°03′42″E
- Country: France
- Region: Normandy
- Department: Orne
- Arrondissement: Alençon
- Canton: Sées
- Commune: Mortrée
- Area^{1}: 8.9 km^{2} (3.4 sq mi)
- Elevation: 223 m (732 ft)
- Highest elevation: 277 m (909 ft)
- Lowest elevation: 193 m (633 ft)
- Population (2022): 128
  - Density: 14/km^{2} (37/sq mi)
- Time zone: UTC+01:00 (CET)
  - Summer (DST): UTC+02:00 (CEST)
- Postal code: 61500
- ^{1} French Land Register data, which excludes lakes, ponds, glaciers > 1 km^{2} (0.386 sq mi or 247 acres) and river estuaries.

Saint-Hilaire-la-Gérard (French pronunciation: [sɛ̃.t‿ilɛʁ la ʒeʁaʁ]) is a former commune in the Orne department in north-western France. On 1 January 2019, it was merged into the commune Mortrée.

== Points of interest ==
This former commune contains La carrière des Vaux a Regional Nature Reserve that is 0.37 hectares in area, making it the smallest nature reserve in France.

== See also ==
- Communes of the Orne department
- Parc naturel régional Normandie-Maine
