= Habitation de Québec =

French colonial settlement

Coordinates: 46.8129°N 71.2025°W

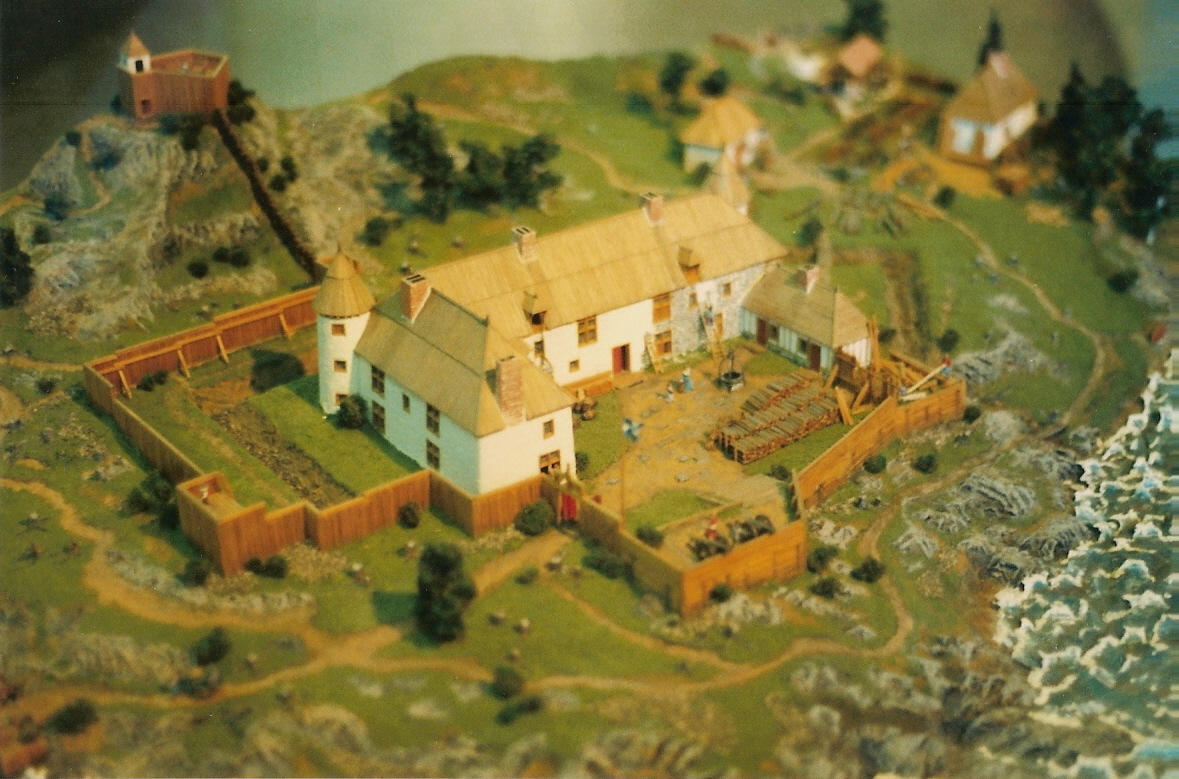
Abitation de Quebec, 1608, established by Samuel de Champlain

Habitation de Québec was an ensemble of buildings interconnected by Samuel de Champlain when he founded Québec during 1608. The site is located in what is now Vieux-Québec, on the site of present-day Place Royale. It was located near the site of the abandoned First Nations village of Stadacona that Jacques Cartier had visited during 1535. It served as a fort and as dwellings for the new colony in New France.

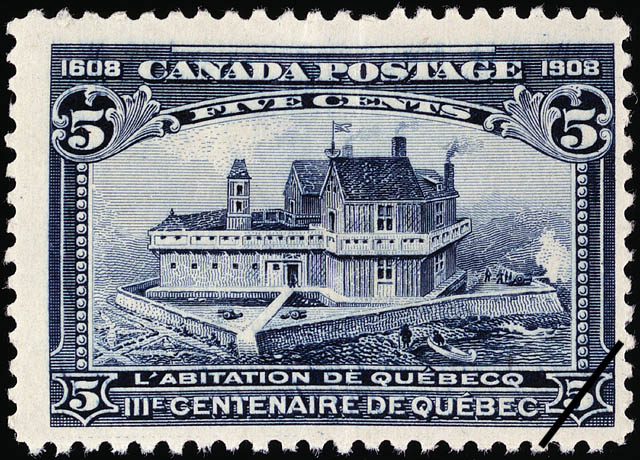
Commemoration stamp, 1908
