= Hilaire Babassana =

Congolese politician and economist

Hilaire Babassana was a Congolese politician and economist. In 1989 he was included in the Central Committee of the Congolese Labour Party (PCT) and appointed to the government as Minister of Fishing, Industry, Handicrafts, and Tourism.
