= Saint-Hilaire-du-Bois, Gironde =

Saint-Hilaire-du-Bois
- Commune
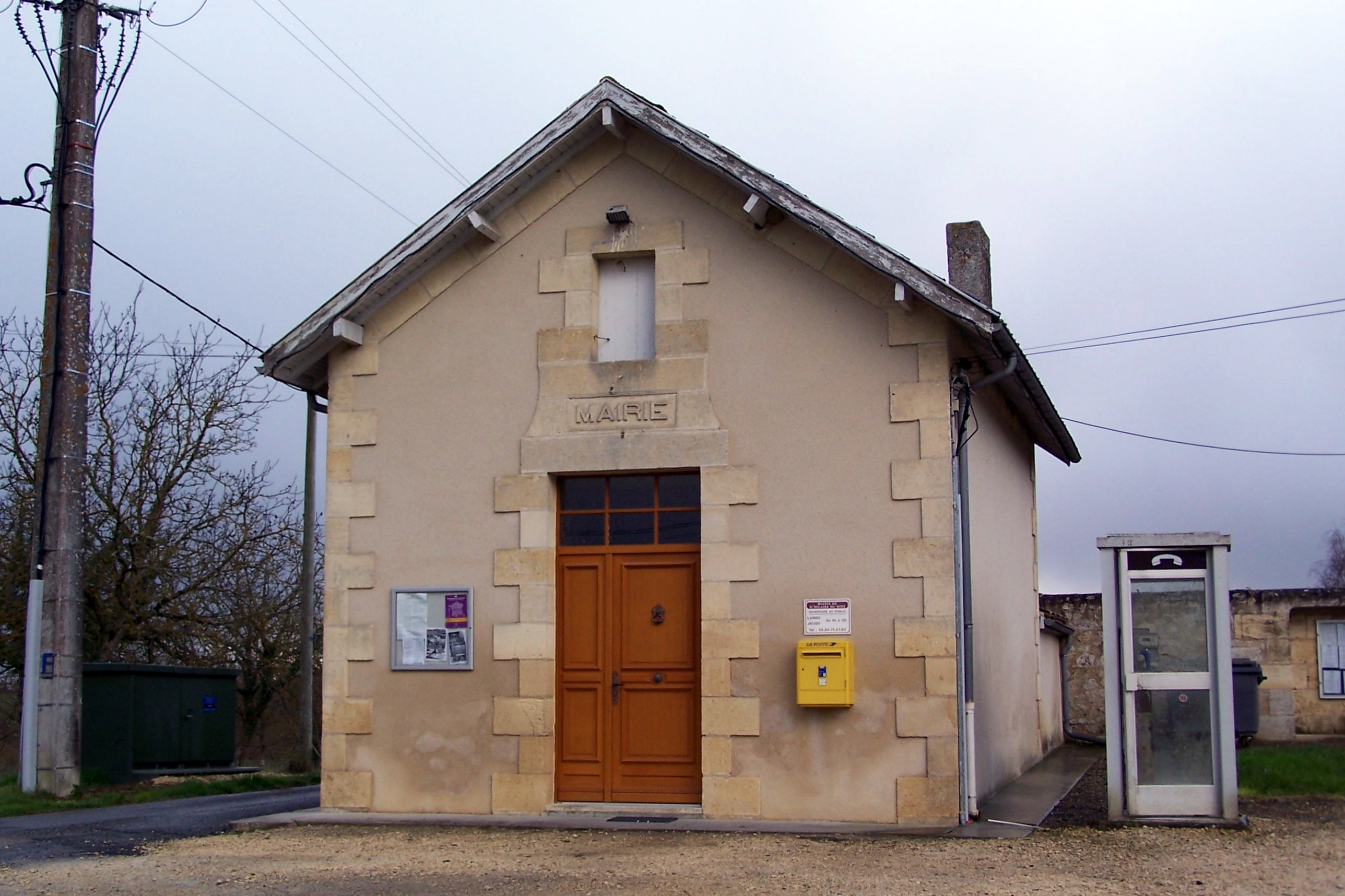
- Town hall
- Location of Saint-Hilaire-du-Bois
- Location within France Location within Nouvelle-Aquitaine
- Coordinates: 44°39′47″N 0°04′46″W
- Country: France
- Region: Nouvelle-Aquitaine
- Department: Gironde
- Arrondissement: Langon
- Canton: Le Réolais et Les Bastides

Government
  - Mayor (2020–2026): Francis Lapeyre
- Area^{1}: 4.5 km^{2} (1.7 sq mi)
- Elevation: 80 m (260 ft)
- Highest elevation: 103 m (338 ft)
- Lowest elevation: 34 m (112 ft)
- Population (2023): 79
  - Density: 18/km^{2} (45/sq mi)
- Time zone: UTC+01:00 (CET)
  - Summer (DST): UTC+02:00 (CEST)
- INSEE/Postal code: 33419 /33540
- ^{1} French Land Register data, which excludes lakes, ponds, glaciers > 1 km^{2} (0.386 sq mi or 247 acres) and river estuaries.

Saint-Hilaire-du-Bois (French pronunciation: [sɛ̃.t‿ilɛʁ dy bwa]; Occitan: Sent Ilari deu Bòsc) is a commune in the Gironde department in Nouvelle-Aquitaine in southwestern France.

== Population ==
Historical population
Year	Pop.	±% p.a.
1968	104	—
1975	92	−1.74%
1982	84	−1.29%
1990	97	+1.81%
1999	92	−0.59%
2007	88	−0.55%
2012	76	−2.89%
2017	78	+0.52%
2023	79	+0.21%
Source: INSEE

== See also ==
- Communes of the Gironde department
