= Hilaire Bernard de La Rivière =

Canadian architect, attorney, and notary

Hilaire Bernard de La Rivière (c. 1640 – 1 December 1729) was a multi-faceted builder as well as a seigneurial attorney and notary in New France.
