= Michel Sarrazin =

Canadian surgeon, physician, scientist and naturalist

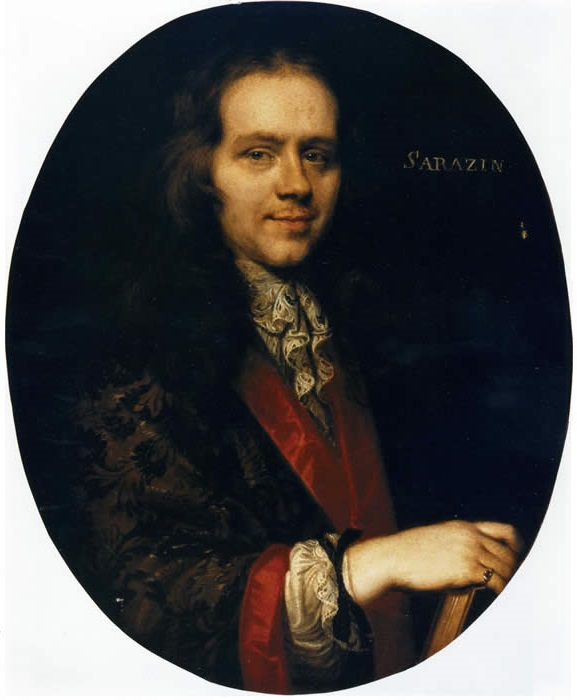
This painting is usually thought to be of Michel Sarrazin, however there is some debate as to whether or not this is true.

Michel Sarrazin (5 September 1659 – 8 September 1734), was a surgeon, physician, scientist and naturalist from New France. Born in Nuits-sous-Beaune in the Province of Burgundy, he immigrated at age 25 to the colony of New France as a surgeon. He remained in the colony for the rest of his life, returning to France only during two brief periods. While in New France, his medical skills were constantly in demand, and he quickly rose in the ranks, becoming one of the colonial elite.

He was both a seigneur and a member of the Conseil Superieur, and held considerable influence in the colony. He had a great interest in botany, and kept up a frequent correspondence with the Académie Royale des Sciences in France, sending fellow scientists numerous specimens of North American plants, as well as detailed descriptions of dissections of animals.

Sarrazin developed a vast knowledge of both the cultural and natural world of New France, and is credited being one of the first scientists to systematically catalogue ecosystems and samples found in New France, resulting in many important botanical discoveries.

Despite his high ranking position as one of the few colonial intellectuals, Sarrazin faced chronic financial struggles, and died in poverty at age seventy-five, leaving a widow and four children.

== Early life ==
Little is known of Michel Sarrazin's early life. His mother was Madeleine de Bonnefoy, and his father was Claude Sarrazin, an official at the Abbey of Cîteaux. He had two brothers, one who became a priest, and another, Claude, who was an attorney. Both of Sarrazin's brothers remained in their hometown of Nuits-sous-Beaune, and died in 1731.

== Arrival in Colony and Return to France (1685–1697) ==
Sarrazin received some medical training in France before he was appointed as surgeon to the King's troops in the colony of New France in 1685. This position required him to minister to both soldiers and town inhabitants. He was quickly noticed for his medical skill, and within a year was promoted to Surgeon Major, becoming the first person to hold this position in the colony.

As Surgeon Major, Sarrazin travelled extensively with troops on expeditions to provide them with medical care. When he wasn't with the troops, Sarrazin was kept busy travelling between the Hotels-dieu of Quebec and Montreal, essentially treating the "civilian population of the entire colony".

He was not paid for his work directly by his patients, but instead received a yearly sum from the King of France, Louis XIV, of around 300 livres. This sum gradually increased over time, but only through much lobbying on the part of Sarrazin and other colonial officials.

Through his work, Sarrazin was constantly exposed to sickness and disease. In 1692 he fell seriously ill, spending about a month in hospital recovering. Around this time, he expressed some desire to join the church, and in 1693, temporarily withdrew from society.

By 1694, however, he decided to return to France to continue his studies in medicine. He was encouraged to return quickly by colonial authorities including Indendant Bochart de Champigny, who recognized the value and necessity of having a skilled doctor in the colony.

Back in France, Sarrazin spent three years studying in both Paris and Reims, where he received his doctorate of medicine. During his time in Paris, he spent time at the Jardin des Plantes, where he met and studied under Joseph Pitton de Tournefort, who introduced him to botany and "stimulated a lifelong interest in collecting and classifying". Sarrazin would later become a "correspondant" to Tournefort, and their relationship provided Sarrazin with an important link to the Académie Royale des Sciences.

Sarrazin returned to New France in 1697 with a renewed interest in both medicine and natural sciences. As if to show how much his expertise was valued in the colony, he was put to work before he even set foot on shore. While on the voyage, the ship experienced an outbreak of "purple fever", or purpura, and Sarrazin, though also sick, devoted himself to caring for the passengers.

== Life in New France (1697–1734) ==
=== Career ===
Back in the colony, Sarrazin resumed his medical practice, armed with the knowledge and credentials he had gained while in France. His skills were valued in the colony, and as the leading medical professional, he was held in high esteem.

In 1699, he was named head doctor of New France. The main goal of Sarrazin's practice was to help the sick restore their health while gaining an understanding of the social and scientific causes of disease. His role was to treat the sick in hospitals in New France and prescribe remedies, but was not limited to that.

Sarrazin also took on the function of apothecary, and became a trusted reference often called upon for medical advice. The lack of registered doctors at the time gave a lot of power to Sarrazin, placing him in a position of high authority. Sarrazin was responsible for identifying the competence of practitioners and had to approve the choice of surgeons for l'Hôtel-Dieu de Québec.

In addition, Sarrazin was also called upon to perform autopsies, give advice in judicial matters, and provide affidavits of miraculous cures at the shrine of Sainte-Anne de Beaupré. Apart from briefly returning to France in 1709–1710, Sarrazin remained in the colony practicing medicine until his death at age 75.

=== Family life ===
After having completed his studies in France and returned to New France, no family member was awaiting Sarrazin's arrival in the colony. It was not until June 20, 1712, fifteen years after his return and at the age of fifty, that Sarrazin married Marie-Anne Hazeur, a former pupil of the Ursulines, in Montreal, Quebec.

Her father, Francois Hazeur, was a prominent businessman and seigneur, and consequently Sarrazin received the seigneuries of Grande-Vallée and of Anse-de l'Étang. Marie-Anne gave birth to seven children, three of which died in infancy. Upon Sarrazin's death, Marie-Anne was left destitute, having to rely on her husband's pension, and later returned to live with her brother, Canon Hazeur.

=== Work with the Académie Royale des Sciences ===
Sarrazin is credited with the discovery of sarsaparilla (Aralia nudicaulis), a member of the ginseng family, which was one, "among the number of unique plants of that country". Sarrazin grew ginseng in his garden for future study, and sent the first sample of the specimen back to the Jardin du Roi in 1701.

The most interesting specimen discovered by Sarrazin is likely Sarracenia purpurea, the pitcher plant, a plant which was previously unknown in France. Linnaeus would name the genus Sarracenia in his honor. He maintained that this plant caught insects and ate them, a theory which was dismissed by the academic community. It was only later, when Charles Darwin published his dissertation in 1875, Insectivorous Plants, that this was validated. This plant, found mainly in bogs and marshes around Quebec, proved to be an effective treatment for smallpox, a disease which plagued Europe and America at the time.

Other discoveries included l'Arum Canadense, which could treat tumours, l'Aralia canadensis, which treats ulcers, l'Aster corora, for epileptic seizures, and l'Angelica Canadensis tenufolia asphodeli radice which can be used as a sedative. Moreover, the native people of New France taught Sarrazin that the sap from Arbor acadiensis could be used to treat sores.

As a correspondent of the Académie Royale des Sciences, Sarrazin consistently sent samples back to Paris, with no expectation of recognition. New France's uncharted lands proved challenging to botanists, as Sarrazin stated in his correspondence, "I could cross all of Europe more easily, and with less danger, than I could cross 100 leagues in Canada". One of Sarrazin's Paris correspondents, Sebastien Vaillant, compiled the documents and specimens sent to New France from Sarrazin into a book published in 1708 titled "Histoires des plantes de Canada". This was the first French botanical text of this nature studying North American flora and fauna.

However, Sarrazin's work remained largely unpublished. His only publication by the Académie Royale des Sciences discussed the syrup extraction process of Canadian maple trees, which can be found in "Observations botaniques". Moreover, Sarrazin printed his observations on the fauna of New France as well, notably describing the beaver, the muskrat, the porcupine, the harbour seal, and the wolverine. Therefore, Sarrazin allowed the people of France to acquire more extensive and diverse knowledge on the flora and fauna of New France.

Sarrazin was also a surgeon, and although he was not permitted to diagnose illnesses or prescribe medication, he was adept at healing fractures, bandaging wounds, draining abscesses and bleeding patients. Sarrazin was the only certified surgeon present during a smallpox epidemic aboard a ship anchored in Quebec, the Diligente, and thus was in charge of medical procedure surrounding the ordeal. While there was no treatment for smallpox, Sarrazin was successful in preventing the spread of disease and in alleviating the pain of his patients by administering cold baths for the fever and powder for the sores.

== Achievements ==
On May 29, 1700, at the Hotel-Dieu of Quebec, Sarrazin performed what seems to be the first mastectomy in North America. The surgery was performed on Sister Marie Barbier de l'Assomption, who had been Mother Superior of the Congregation Notre-Dame in Montreal. Sarrazin's own concerns for the nun are apparent in his writings;

"No matter what option I choose, I see my Sister de l'Assomption in danger of an imminent death. If we don't operate, she will surely die within a few days, since she is getting worse by the day; and to attempt an operation will nearly inevitably lead to her death, since there is hardly any hope that she could sustain it and even less hope that she could recover from it". The operation was a resounding success, and the nun lived for another 39 years, dying at the age of 77.

Sarrazin's specimens can now be found in the Muséum National d'Histoire Naturelle, in Paris; including a specimen of Sarracenia purpurea.

== Maison Michel-Sarrazin ==
The Maison Michel-Sarrazin is a private palliative care, non-profit hospital. The House opened its doors in 1985 and since then has treated over 7,000 patients. In 2010, the House celebrated its 25th anniversary.

=== Le Prix Michel Sarrazin ===
The Michel Sarrazin Award recognizes the scientific career and outstanding contribution of an experienced Québécois scientist. It is awarded annually to a scientist who, through innovation and productivity, has contributed in vital ways to the advancement of biomedical research.
