= Leon Chechemian =

Armenian Christian cleric (1848–1920)

Leon Chechemian (Mar Leon (Note: According to Anson, the Ancient British Church archives "cannot produce documentary evidence" that Chechemian used the religious title of "Mar".)) (1848–1920) was an Armenian Christian cleric. In 1897, he was a founder of the Free Protestant Episcopal Church (full name: Free Protestant Episcopal Church of England), and that church's first primus. He is also considered an episcopus vagans.

== Early life ==
Chechemian or Checkemian was born in Malatya, Eastern Anatolia to parents Jacob and Rose (née Gruchian). His family were originally Armenian Apostolic and converted to Armenian Catholicism when he was 13.

== Ministry, 1866-circa 1879 ==
Chechemian was ordained as a priest on 27 November 1866 by Leon Chorchorunian (lived 1822–1897), the Armenian Catholic Church's archbishop of Malatya. (Note: Leon Chorchorunian was the Armenian Catholic Church diocesan archbishop of Melitene from 1861 to 1897.) (Note: Felix Marie De Neckere was the Latin Church titular archbishop of Melitene, living in Rome, from 1875 to 1903.)

In this capacity, Chechemian served at Besui (1866–1868), Aintab (1868), Gurum (1868–1877) and then moved to Malatya.

At Malatya, probably in 1878 or thereabouts, Chechemian was blessed as vardapet, a highly educated celibate priest, or archimandrite, who is a doctor of theology. A vardapet may hold rank similar to that of a bishop, though without the power to ordain priests. (Note: see below – comments by Brandreth)

In 1890, Chechemian was described as "an Armenian Catholic priest of the highest degree" who received "his degree of very honourable doctor" from Chorchorunian on 23 April 1878, and was later, while in Constantinople, "referred to as a prominent, well known dignitary."

== Consecration (disputed, or doubtful) as an Armenian Catholic bishop, c. 1879 ==
Whether Chechemian was ever raised (within the Armenian Catholic jurisdiction) from vardapet to bishop is disputed. According to Alan Bain, Chechemian was first consecrated as a bishop on 23 April 1879 by Leon Chorchorunian. However, Bain also notes that Henry Brandreth considers it doubtful that Chorchorunian ever consecrated Chechemian as a bishop.

If Bain is correct that there was this 1879 consecration on 23 April 1879, it took place precisely twelve months after the date on which it is known that Chechemian had been blessed as a vardapet, 23 April 1878. An alternative possibility might be that Bain's 23 April 1879 date is a transcription error for 23 April 1878 and that Bain (or Bain's sources) did not appreciate the significant and important distinction between a vardapet and a bishop.

Brandreth noted that Chechemian was "said to have been" a titular bishop who "had no jurisdiction to perform consecrations"; his doubt about whether Chechemian was consecrated as a bishop by Chorchorunian is supported by others. An 1890 letter to the editor from a promoter of Chechemian to the Belfast News Letter never referred to Chechemian as a bishop. According to Anson, Chechemian both used "the word 'doctor' as more intelligible to Scottish Presbyterian readers" in the 1880s, and years later stated that he was consecrated a bishop in 1879. Anson also noted that in the 1880s Frederick Temple, bishop of London, "recommended him as 'a bishop of a church other than the established church'", but Anson supposed that in the 1880s Archibald Tait, archbishop of Canterbury, "was not aware of the precise status of a vartapet—or did Chechemian mislead him?" There was an unsubstantiated story in 1897 that embellished details about Chechemian.

According to Bertil Persson, "Checkemian has not, as has been stated, been consecrated a Bishop in The Armenian Catholic Church."

While Persson did not write in a section about "The apostolic succession of the Apostolic Episcopal Church from the Armenian Catholic Church" that Chechemian was consecrated as bishop by Chorchorunian, Persson had not removed that section but equivocated that Chechemian was only "blessed as vardapet" by Chorchorunian in 1878. A vardapet "receives a scholarly degree" through ordination and receives a crozier "which symbolizes wisdom and authority to teach and to preach", nevertheless a vardapet is not a bishop but monk.

The 1893 edition of Crockford's Clerical Directory did not note any prior episcopal status.

== Ministry, 1878–89 ==
Between 1878 and 1881 Chechemian served in a leadership role in the Armenian Catholic Church in his hometown of Malatya. Initially (1878–79), this was as a vardapet. The question of whether, in 1878 or 1879, he was raised to episcopal status in the Armenian Catholic Church is discussed earlier in this article.

He became Protestant. He emigrated to the United Kingdom in 1885 and worked as a groom; he moved to Edinburgh, Scotland, where he lived on charity, studied at New College, Edinburgh, and worked with the Scottish Reformation Society; he moved to Belfast, Ireland,

== Formation of the Free Protestant Church, c. 1889 ==
Chechemian became a notable lecturer at various churches in the city of Belfast and in c. 1889 founded a meeting place for a mix of Protestant denominations called the Free Protestant Church of England.

== Consecration as a bishop of the Free Protestant Church, c. 1889 ==
Alan Bain writes that Chechemian was elected archbishop of the Free Protestant Church of England and that he was consecrated for this office by six bishops, but adds that no details of these bishops are known.

== Consecration as a bishop of the Ancient British Church, May 1890 ==
On 4 May 1890, Chechemian received consecration as a bishop for the Ancient British Church from Charles Isaac Stevens, (also known as Mar Theophilus I (Note: According to Anson, the Ancient British Church archives "cannot produce documentary evidence" that Stevens used the religious title and name "Mar Theophilus".)), patriarch of the Ancient British Church, assisted by Alfred Spencer Richardson, bishop of the branch of the Reformed Episcopal Church in England. (Note: This may have been his first episcopal consecration, or it may have been a further or subsequent consecration.)

Richardson's unauthorised acts, the consecration of James Martin c. 1888 and participation in the conditional consecration of Chechemian in 1890, were according to John Fenwick, in The Free Church of England, "the only time in the history of the Free Church of England or its constituent bodies one of its bishops took part in the consecrations of what are known as episcopi vagantes", and resulted in a canonical case brought against Richardson. Richardson resigned and the case did not proceed. According to Anson, the conditional consecration of Chechemian by Stevens and Richardson shows that both consecrators did not comprehend that a vardapet "has no episcopal status."

The questions of whether the consecration (1890) by Stevens and Richardson was the first consecration of Chechemian, or whether he had earlier (c. 1878 or 1879) been consecrated as a bishop for the Armenian Catholic Church by Chorchorunian and/or (c. 1889) as a bishop for the Protestant Episcopal Church are discussed earlier in this article.

== Formation of the United Armenian Catholic Church, August 1890 ==
On 15 August 1890, Chechemian founded the United Armenian Catholic Church to provide for fellow British Armenian refugees with a non-Catholic option.

== Reception into Church of Ireland, 1890 ==
He was received into the Church of Ireland in 1890, and was licensed as a cleric in the Church of Ireland's Diocese of Dublin and Glendalough by William Plunket, 4th Baron Plunket, archbishop of Dublin.

== Formation and early life of the Free Protestant Episcopal Church, 1897–1900 ==
The Free Protestant Episcopal Church was formed on 2 November 1897 at St. Stephen's Church in East Ham, London by uniting the Ancient British Church, led by Stevens; the Free Protestant Church, founded and led by Chechemian; and the Nazarene Episcopal Church, founded and led by Martin.

Chechemian was appointed first primus of the new church. George Maaers and Frederick Boucher were consecrated on 2 November 1897 by Chechemian and Martin to assist in the leadership of the new church.

Chechemian led the new church as a separate organisation from the United Armenian Catholic Church.

== Resignation as primus of the Free Protestant Episcopal Church, 1900 ==
On 30 December 1900, Chechemian resigned as primus of the Free Protestant Episcopal Church. Stevens then took over as primus of the Free Protestant Episcopal Church. (Stevens had been appointed second patriarch of the Ancient British Church in 1889).

== British citizenship, 1901 ==
Chechemian became a naturalised British citizen in 1901 while living in Edinburgh.

== Death, 1920 ==
Chechemian died on 3 December 1920.

== Leadership succession ==
Stevens died on 2 February 1917. Martin (Mar Jacobus I Antipas (Note: According to Anson, the Ancient British Church archives "cannot produce documentary evidence" that Martin used the religious title and name "Mar Jacobus".)) then took over as third patriarch of the Ancient British Church and as third primus of the Free Protestant Episcopal Church.

Martin died in 1919. Andrew Charles Albert McLagen (Mar Andries (Note: According to Anson, the Ancient British Church archives "cannot produce documentary evidence" that McLagen used the religious title and name "Mar Andries".)) was patriarch of the Ancient British Church and primus of the Free Protestant Episcopal church from 1919 until he died in 1928.

The Free Protestant Episcopal Church of England was officially recognised as a legally constituted denomination by the British Government in early 1917 after a test case of the 1916 Military Service Act. Ernest A. Asquith helped obtain this recognition that allowed clergy exemption from military service in World War I.

== Continuation ==
The Ancient British Church and the Free Protestant Episcopal Church were separated when Herbert James Monanzi-Heard, McLagan's successor, was succeeded by William Hall in the Free Protestant Episcopal Church on 18 May 1939, and was succeeded by Hugh George de Willmott Newman in the Ancient British Church on 29 January 1945.

The Free Protestant Episcopal Church continues today as the Anglican Free Communion (renamed in 2012), led (for more than twenty years) by Bishop Edwin Duane Follick. A schism occurred from 1978 to 2011.

The Free Protestant Episcopal Church has also used the names "Episcopal Apostolic Church of England" and "Ecumenical Church Foundation".

The Ancient British Church continues today in several bodies, including the British Orthodox Church (a canonical local church within the Coptic Orthodox Church of Alexandria from 1994 until 2015), and the Celtic Orthodox Church (now united with the French Orthodox Church and the Orthodox Church of the Gauls, forming the Communion of Western Orthodox Churches (CWOC)).

There are many hundreds, perhaps thousands, of bishops deriving lines of succession through Chechemian.

== Lines of succession ==
=== (A) via the Armenian Catholic Church, (from Leon Chorchorunian and Cardinal/Patriarch Antony Hassun) ===
From the above, it can be seen that there is certainly a line of presbyteral succession from Leon Chorchorunian (lived 1822–1897) of the Armenian Catholic Church. However, whether it is an episcopal succession is disputed as explained above, and may be doubtful.

Leon Chorchorunian was consecrated on 7 April 1861 by Antony Hassun.

Hassun (lived 1809–1884) was archbishop of Malatya and an Armenian Catholic patriarch. Hassun is also known as Antoine-Pierre IX, and sometimes, for example by Bain, as Pierre Antoine IX. There are various spellings of his surname, such as Hassum, Hassoun and Hassounian. In 1880, the Pope of Rome appointed him a cardinal. He retired in 1881, becoming patriarch-emeritus.

=== (B) Protestant Episcopal Church ===
Comment is not possible as details of this consecration or alleged consecration are not known. For succession after Chechemian, see Free Protestant Episcopal Church#Succession of primuses.

=== (C) from Stevens ===
Charles Isaac Stevens was consecrated on 6 March 1879 by Richard Williams Morgan, assisted by Frederick George Lee and Dr John Thomas Seccombe.

Morgan had been consecrated at Marholm in Northamptonshire, England on 6 March 1874 by Jules Ferrette. Ferrette (originally a Roman Catholic priest) claimed to have been consecrated as a bishop in 1866 by the Syrian Orthodox bishop of Damascus, MV Bedros, who later (1872) became Maran Mar Ignatius Peter IV (or III) of Antioch, known as "Peter the Humble", the Syrian Orthodox patriarch.

Lee and Seccombe, together with Thomas Mossman were the three founders and leaders of the Order of Corporate Reunion. The three of them claimed to have been secretly consecrated (c. 1877) as bishops. There has been much speculation and conjecture as to who their consecrators were. Owing to the secrecy that long surrounded these consecrations, it may be difficult to establish the facts definitively. However, the website of the Order of Corporate Reunion (as at 2015 led by Peter Paul Brennan) asserts that the consecrators were Dominicus Agostina (cardinal patriarch of Venice), Luigi Nazari di Caliana (archbishop of Milan), Vincentius Moretti (a cardinal), and Ignatios Ghiurekian (a Byzantine archbishop and abbot-general of Ordo Mechitaristarum Venetiarum from the island of St Lazarus near Venice), and that they acted with the authority of Pope Pius IX.

=== (D) from Richardson ===
Alfred Spencer Richardson was consecrated on 22 June 1879 in the Reformed Episcopal Church in Philadelphia, USA by William Rufus Nicholson, a bishop of the Reformed Episcopal Church, USA. WR Nicholson was consecrated for the Protestant Episcopal Church, USA on 24 February 1876 by Charles Edward Cheney who was consecrated (14 December 1873) by George David Cummins, American Episcopal assistant bishop of Kentucky, USA, and who was consecrated (15 November 1866) by John Henry Hopkins, Episcopal bishop of Vermont, USA. The line of succession to Hopkins is traceable from William Sancroft (enthroned archbishop of Canterbury, 1678) via Thomas White (bishop of Peterborough, England), George Hickes (assistant bishop of Thetford, England), James Gadderar (bishop of Aberdeen, Scotland), Thomas Rattray (bishop of Dunkeld, Scotland), William Falconer (or Falconar) (bishop of Caithness, Scotland), Robert Kilgour (bishop of Aberdeen, Scotland), Samuel Seabury (bishop of Connecticut, USA), Thomas Clagett (bishop of Maryland, USA), Edward Bass (bishop of Massachusetts, USA), Abraham Jarvis (bishop of Connecticut, USA), Alexander Viets Griswold (bishop of Eastern Diocese, USA) who in 1832 consecrated Hoskins.
