= British Orthodox Church =

Christian denomination

- Logo of the British Orthodox Church
- Classification: Independent Oriental Orthodox
- Orientation: Eastern Christian
- Theology: Oriental Orthodox theology
- Polity: Episcopal
- Primate: Patriarch Jacobus III
- Language: English
- Headquarters: 10 Heathwood Gardens, Charlton, London, United Kingdom
- Founder: Jules Ferrette (claimed)
- Branched from: Coptic Orthodox Church (2015)
- Merged into: Coptic Orthodox Church (1994–2015)
- Official website: britishorthodox.org

The British Orthodox Church (BOC), formerly the Orthodox Church of the British Isles, is an independent Christian church originating in the United Kingdom, having its roots in Oriental Orthodoxy. Its ecclesiastical heritage descended from the Syriac Orthodox Church of Antioch and the Coptic Orthodox Church of Alexandria.

The British Orthodox Church has not been in communion with any of the mainstream Oriental Orthodox churches since a 2015 decision to return to its independent, autocephalous status.

== History ==
=== Origins ===
The church claims to be the continuation of the Ancient British Church of Jules Ferrette.

Metropolitan Seraphim of Glastonbury (William Henry Hugo Newman-Norton) served as the metropolitan of the Metropolis of Glastonbury and Patriarch of the Orthodox Church of the British Isles, succeeding his uncle Hugh George de Willmott Newman. Previously, Seraphim served as his uncle's perpetual coadjutor; and in 1971, he was ordained as a priest by Hugh George de Willmott Newman.

=== Merger into the Coptic Orthodox Church ===
The Orthodox Church of the British Isles and the Celtic Orthodox Church split in 1994, under Mar Seraphim. For its part, the Orthodox Church of the British Isles joined the Coptic Orthodox Church and changed its name to British Orthodox Church.

On 6 April 1994, a protocol enacting the merge of the Orthodox Church of the British Isles into the Coptic Orthodox Church was signed by both parties. The British Orthodox Church then became "a diocese of the Coptic Orthodox Patriarchate of Alexandria with jurisdiction over the United Kingdom, Ireland, the Isle of Man and the Channel Islands". The British Orthodox Church was distinct from the other communities in the British Isles of the Coptic Church. Seraphim, primate of the British Orthodox Church, was not reordained, but received a chrismation; and on 19 June 1994, Seraphim "was consecrated as a metropolitan in the Coptic Patriarchate by His Holiness Pope Shenouda assisted by some seventy Metropolitans and Bishops". Seraphim then became member of the Holy Synod of the Coptic Orthodox Church.

=== Autocephaly from the Coptic Orthodox Church ===
On 4 October 2015 the Coptic Orthodox Church, in response to a request from the British Orthodox Church, "in the same spirit with which this union came into being", agreed to the British Orthodox Church returning to its pre-1994 status "in fulfilment to what it sees as its current mission in the light of the developments and changing dynamics of the Middle East and Britain". The British Orthodox Church's website spoke of it "amicably returning to its original status in order to fulfil its mission more effectively". This resulted in the British Orthodox Church returning to a non-canonical status, outside of communion with any church; it was, however, autocephalous again.

On 29 October 2017, Metropolitan Seraphim, acting solus, consecrated Father David Seeds as Bishop David of Priddy.

In January 2019, the church announced that Seraphim was once again considered as its patriarch, since from the moment of the union with the Coptic Orthodox Church, Seraphim had ceased to use this title.

On 23 February 2019, Patriarch Seraphim, acting with Bishop David of Priddy, consecrated Father James Maskery as Abba James, Archbishop Titular of Caerleon-upon-Usk and Mafrian of the British Orthodox Church. Mafrian is a title used in the Syrian Orthodox Church for the Catholicos of India, and the primate of the church in the Sassanid Empire, now Iran and Iraq.

== Publications ==
Through the church press it publishes the Glastonbury Review, the only English-language journal committed to regular reporting about the activities of the Oriental Orthodox churches and it has also begun to republish some theological works.

== Primates ==
- Richard Williams Morgan (claimed) (1874–1889)
- Charles Isaac Stevens (claimed) (1889–1917)
- James Martin (claimed) (1917–1919)
- Andries Caarel Albertus McLaglen (claimed) (1919–1922)
- Herbert James Monzani-Heard (claimed) (1919–1944)
- Hugh George de Willmott Newman (1944–1979)
- William Henry Hugo Newman-Norton (1979–2025)
- Jacobus III (since 2025)

== See also ==
- Catholicate of the West
