= Jules Ferrette =

French religious leader

Jules Ferrette, also spelled Julius Ferrette (22 April 1828 – 10 October 1904 or in 1903), was allegedly bishop of Iona; and he was the purported founder of the Ancient British Church.

== Biography ==
Ferrette was born in Épinal, France, possibly of Protestant parents. Ferrette joined the Catholic Church during his youth, and then joined the Flavigny province of the Dominican Order in 1851. He was given the religious name Raymond. He thereafter studied philosophy and theology at Grenoble and Paris, and was ordained a priest on 2 June 1855.

He was a Dominican missionary in Mesopotamia and Kurdistan from September to June 1856, but then apostasized from the Catholic Church.

Ferrette became a Presbyterian minister and missionary. He worked with the Irish Presbyterian Mission in Damascus from 1858 to 1865, and assisted Frederick Hamilton-Temple-Blackwood's mission to the poor Christians of Mount Lebanon from 1860 to 1862.

Ferrette claims he was consecrated as the bishop of Iona and its dependencies by Mutran Boutros (later the Syriac Orthodox Patriarch of Antioch) at Homs (Emesa) on 2 June 1866 who was allegedly acting solus and would have given Ferrette a mission to introduce Oriental Orthodoxy to the West. No original document of this alleged consecration is known to exist; and Ferrette published what he claimed was an official English translation of his Syriac consecration document after he arrived in London. The document was signed by the British consul at Damascus.

In Oxfordshire in 1858, Richard Williams Morgan—an Anglican priest—was conditionally "baptised, confirmed, ordained and consecrated" as patriarch of the Ancient British Church by Ferrette, and given by Ferrette the following name and full title: Mar Pelagius I, Hierarch of Caerleon-on-Usk.

Ferrette died in Geneva in 1904 or in 1903.

== Apostolic succession claims ==
The following churches and bishops are the main ones which claim, have claimed or are believed to be descending from Ferrette's apostolic succession through alleged episcopal ordinations received from Ferrette or from bishops who claim their consecration line goes back to Ferrette:

- Jules Ferrette
  - Richard Williams Morgan allegedly consecrated bishop by Ferrette.
    - Charles Isaac Stevens, allegedly consecrated by Richard Williams Morgan in 1879; Stevens was allegedly re-consecrated bishop by Leon Chechemian sometimes after Stevens with Richardson had consecrated Chechemian (see below).
      - Leon Chechemian, allegedly consecrated in 1890 by Charles Isaac Stevens and Alfred Spencer Richardson (the latter was from the Reformed Episcopal Church in the United States).
        - James Martin, allegedly consecrated bishop in 1897 by Leon Chechemian.
          - Charles Albert McLaglen, consecrated bishop in 1897 by James Martin, Leon Chechemian, G.W.L. Maaers, and F. Boucher.
            - Mar Jacobus II (Herbert James Monzani Heard), consecrated bishop by McLaglen.
              - William Bernard Crow, founder of the esoteric Order of Holy Wisdom; ordained bishop in 1943 by Mar Jacobus II under the name Mar Bernard, then took the name Abdullah III.
                - Hugh George de Willmott Newman, ordained bishop in 1944 by Abdullah III.
                  - British Orthodox Church and abba Seraphim
                    - Celtic Orthodox Church
              - Mar Frederic (Harrington), consecrated bishop under condition by Jacobus II.
                - The line of succession also continued at least into the late 1950s in Britain under Dorian A. F. Herbert of Newport, Wales, who was the head of the offshoot Ancient British Church. Herbert founded the Jesuene Church, also called the Free Orthodox-Catholic Church, in 1937. Thereafter, Herbert was consecrated bishop of Caerleon in 1937 by the primate of the Orthodox-Keltic Church of the British Commonwealth of Nations, Mar Frederic (Harrington). On 3 December 1944, Herbert was re-consecrated bishop by Willmott Newman. After this, Herbert "later syling himself Mar Doreo and regarding himself as the successor of Mar Pelagius (Morgan) [...] revived the [...] Ancient British Church" which had ceased to exist as it had merged into the Catholicate of the West. In 1957, the name of Herbert's church was changed to "Ancient British Church (Agnostic)", with "(Agnostic)" meaning his church did not follow any dogma.
