= Neo-Celtic Christianity =

Christian new religious movement

Neo-Celtic Christianity or Contemporary Celtic Christianity are terms used to describe a religious movement to re-assert or restore beliefs and practices that its adherents believe to have originated in Celtic Christianity. Celtic Christianity is a term originally applied to a variety of Christianity which evolved in the British Isles during the first millennium of the Christian era, and particularly during the first half of the first millennium.

== History ==
The revivalist movement traces its origins to Jules Ferrette (Mar Julius) and Richard Williams Morgan (Mar Pelagius), who established the Ancient British Church in 1858.

Some consider that the transition from the 'old religion' (i.e. from pre-Christian Celtic beliefs) to Christian faith and allegiance was an easy, smooth and harmonious transition, and that neo-Celtic Christianity or contemporary Celtic Christianity holds a distinctive and unique place within Christianity in that it has allegedly preserved or restored an ancient body of esoteric divine wisdom unknown in other branches of Christianity.

=== Contemporary views ===
Contemporary Celtic, or neo-Celtic Christianity portrays a gentle, tolerant, 'green', meditative, egalitarian and holistic form of Christian faith and practice. Such a 'Celtic' form of Christianity is seen by some as representing a survival or restoration of an early 'pure' form of Christianity which they hold as having existed in the British Isles long before missions such as Augustine's mission to Canterbury in AD 597 introduced and overlaid Roman forms of Christian faith and practice.

The origins of some contemporary Neo-Celtic beliefs can be traced to the works of Bishop Thomas Burgess, which were further expounded in works such as Richard Williams Morgan's book Saint Paul in Britain.

Within these teachings of Morgan and dozens of others on the first Century Church in Britain is a branch of Neo-Celtic Orthodoxy. These prevailing Neo Celtic Christian views advocate for a Celtic church preeminence in numerous publications. One such newsletter and book club is found at St Andrew's the Orthodox Church of the Culdees. They claim the Celtic church had originated many of the oldest liturgical works and pioneered the purest monasticism of the West. They boast a catalogue of over 1,000 Celtic Saints that flourished before the Pope sent Augustine to England.

== Views on reincarnation ==
Reincarnation is widely regarded as a Celtic belief in neo-pagan, New Age, and druidic circles. Even in some neo-Celtic Christian circles (contemporary Celtic Christian circles), belief in reincarnation may be retained.

== See also ==
- Ancient British Church
- Celtic Christianity
- Celtic Orthodox Church
- Celtic Revival
- David Adam (minister)
- Gorsedd of Bards
