= St. Paul in Britain =

1861 book by Richard Williams Morgan

St. Paul in Britain; or, The origin of British as opposed to papal Christianity
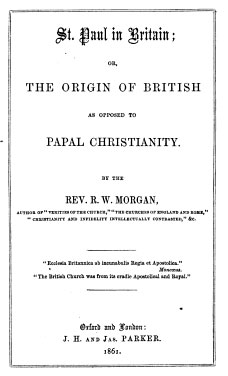
- Cover of the first edition
- Author: Richard Williams Morgan
- Language: English
- Subject: Welsh Bardic and Druidic Theology
- Genre: Historical essay
- Publisher: J.H. and Jas. Parker
- Publication date: 1861
- Publication place: United Kingdom (Oxford and London)
- Media type: print
- Pages: 128pp
- ISBN: 978-0-934-66612-1

St. Paul in Britain; or, The origin of British as opposed to papal Christianity is a book written by Richard Williams Morgan and published in 1861. The book and others by Morgan influenced the development of Neo-Celtic Christianity. The fifth to seventh editions were published by the Covenant Publishing Company, London, in 1925, 1939 and later.

The work suggests the early entry of Christianity into Britain by Paul the Apostle, Simon Zelotes and Joseph of Aramathea. It lists thirty one different druidic universities which he says had been established in most of the subsequently well known English cities, which Morgan named using real or invented Welsh names.

History professor Joanne Pearson commented that "Morgan's lifetime saw both the heyday and the demise of the story in Wales" of an alleged early entry of Christianity, which began the year Morgan was born with works written by Bishop Thomas Burgess arguing that Paul the Apostle converted Britain to Christianity and ended with an essay by Vicar John Pryce which refuted the arguments for an early entry of Christianity and was written shortly before his death.

The book makes the claim that Caractacus and his family were converted to Christianity and that he founded "the royal family of ancient Britain,— of whom her present Majesty, Queen Victoria, is, through the Tudors, the lineal blood representative". He also argued that Boudica was a Christian and related by marriage to Paul the Apostle.

The author Gerald Gardner had a copy of Morgan's book and used it as the basis for his writing on British Christianity.

Edward Cardwell published a critical booklet on the topic in 1837 entitled The Supposed Visit of St Paul to Britain: a Lecture Delivered in the University of Oxford (Sermons, Volume 2), that predated Morgan's book.

== See also ==
- Ancient British Church
- The Lost Chapter of the Acts of the Apostles
