= Catholic Christian Church =

Catholic Church in America

- Classification: Western Christianity
- Orientation: Independent Old Catholic
- Polity: Episcopal
- Founder: Wallace David de Ortega Maxey
- Origin: 1970

The Catholic Christian Church was an Independent Old Catholic church founded in 1970 by Wallace David de Ortega Maxey.

== History ==
Wallace David de Ortega Maxey founded the Catholic Christian Church after 25 years with the Universalist Church. Prior, Maxey also served within the nascent LGBT rights movement in California as a gay activist, and within the Apostolic Episcopal Church as a bishop.

Alan S. Stanford was in charge of the church's ministry in the San Francisco area, which included the church's chapel, the Holy Order of the Society of St. Jude Thaddeus, and the National Catholic Street Ministry Project.

As of 1987, the church had two bishops and three priests working in the San Francisco area, and three mission stations.

== See also ==
- Christian denomination
- Independent Catholicism
- Catholicate of the West
