= Catholicate of the West =

Former Christian denomination (1944–1994)

- Abbreviation: COTW
- Type: Western Christian
- Classification: Independent Western Rite Orthodox
- Scripture: Bible
- Polity: Episcopal
- Liturgy: Rite of Glastonbury
- Origin: 1944; London, England
- Absorbed: Ancient British Church, British Orthodox Catholic Church, Apostolic Episcopal Church, Old Catholic Orthodox Church, Order of Holy Wisdom, Order of Antoch
- Defunct: 1994
- Other names: Catholic Apostolic Church, Catholicate of the West (Catholic Apostolic Church), The United Orthodox Catholic Rite, The Celtic Catholic Church, the Patriarchate of Glastonbury, The Western Orthodox Catholic Church, and the Orthodox Church of the British Isles

The Catholicate of the West was an Independent Western Rite Orthodox denomination established in 1944, following a council between prelates from: the Ancient British Church, the British Orthodox Catholic Church, the Apostolic Episcopal Church, the Old Catholic Orthodox Church, the Order of Holy Wisdom, and the Order of Antioch. In 1994, the Catholicate of the West ceased to exist, becoming the British Orthodox Church under the Coptic Orthodox Church of Alexandria. This successor to the Catholicate of the West would later become administratively independent from the Oriental Orthodox Churches.

The denomination was also known as the Catholic Apostolic Church, the Catholicate of the West (Catholic Apostolic Church), The United Orthodox Catholic Rite, The Celtic Catholic Church, the Patriarchate of Glastonbury, The Western Orthodox Catholic Church, and the Orthodox Church of the British Isles.

== History ==
=== Background ===
==== Notice from Aphrem I ====
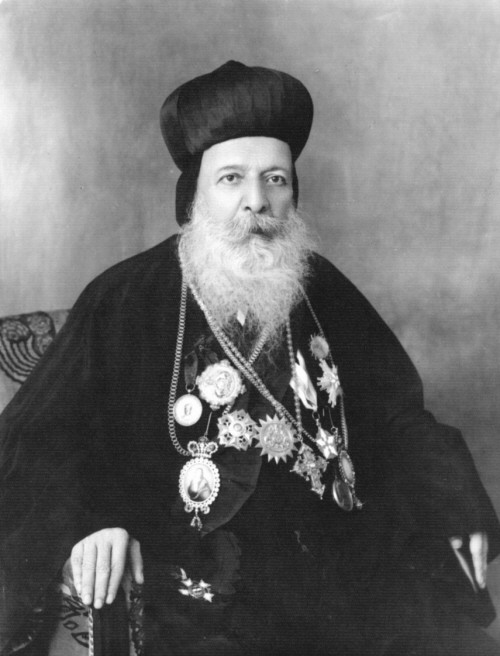
Ignatius Aphrem I of the Syriac Orthodox Church of Antioch

On 1 December 1938, Ignatius Aphrem I of the Syriac Orthodox Patriarchate of Antioch and All the East, issued a notice in which it was stated among other things:

- "[T]o all whom it may concern that there are in the United States of America and in some countries of Europe, particularly in England, a number of schismatic bodies which have come into existence after direct expulsion from official Christian communities and have devised for themselves a common creed and a system of jurisdiction of their invention".
- "To deceive Christians of the West being a chief objective of the schismatic bodies, they take advantage of their great distance from the East, and from time to time make public statements claiming without truth to derive their origin and apostolic succession from some Apostolic Church of the East, the attractive rites and ceremonies of which they adopt and with which they claim to have relationship".
- "[W]e deny any and every relationship with these schismatic bodies [...]. Furthermore, our Church forbids any and every relationship and, above all, all intercommunion with all and any of these schismatic sects and warns the public that their statements and pretentions as above all altogether without truth".

The statement alarmed the head of the Ancient British Church, Patriarch Herbert James Monzani Heard (religious name: Mar Jacobus II).

==== Council of London ====
On 17 October 1943, a council later known as the Council of London took place, as Mar Jacobus II had decided to respond to Aphrem's notice. The council was composed of major and minor prelates from the Ancient British Church, the British Orthodox Catholic Church, the Apostolic Episcopal Church, the Old Catholic Orthodox Church, the Order of Holy Wisdom, and the Order of Antioch. The council took place at 271 Green Lanes, Palmers Green; part of the building was rented as an office of the patriarch of the Ancient British Church.

The summary of the decision of this council which was printed on a leaflet stated, among other things, the following:

- "The Council, embracing steadfastly the definitions of the Seven Ecumenical Councils and the Holy Apostolical Traditions repudiated the heresies of Monophysitism and Jansenism and all other heresies"
- "[I]n view of Ignatius Ephrem I having disclaimed all connection with the above-mentioned extensions of his patriarchate, lawfully made by his predecessor, the said Ignatius Ephrem was no longer recognized as holding office, that in consequence of the Patriarchal Synod and many of the bishops in Syria and Malabar having adhered to the aforementioned the right to elect to the vacant see was declared to be now vested in the Council"

The council also states that "in order to prevent confusion with the followers of the adherents of the aforesaid patriarch", the "rightful Patriarchate of Antioch should no longer be called 'the Syrian Orthodox' or 'Jacobite' Church, but should be hereafter known as 'The Ancient Orthodox Catholic Church' and by no other name". Also, "the original jurisdiction of the Patriarchate should remain as heretofore, but its extensions in the West were specifically recognized and confirmed in their rights".

Furthermore, "the traditional name 'Ignatius' in the official designation of the Patriarch should be abandoned, and the name 'Basilius' substituted therefor; [...] the full Patriarchal title should in future be as follows: 'His Holiness Mohoran Mar Basilius N., Sovereign Prince Patriarch of the God-protected city of Antioch and of all the Domain of the Apostolic Throne, both in the East and in the West'".

The council elected William Bernard Crow, founder of the esoteric Order of Holy Wisdom as their rival Antiochian patriarch. He was previously ordained a bishop in 1943 by Mar Jacobus II under the name Mar Bernard; after this election, Crow took the religious name Patriarch Basilius Abdullah III. The council stated that "all bishops dependant upon the See of Antioch were required to make their canonical submission" to Abdullah III "within six months from the date of the Council, unless lawfully hindered".

All those churches present at the council claimed to be an extension of the Syriac Orthodox Patriarchate of Antioch; this rested upon Jules Ferrette's claim of a purported, official English translation of his original consecratory papers received by Ignatius Peter IV of Antioch. According to Anson:

If the truth must be told, those so-called 'extensions' of the Antiochene Patriarchate were a chimera, based on the tradition handed down from the eighteen-sixties that the apostate French Dominican, Julius Ferrette, having been consecrated Bishop of Iona by Mar Bedros, Bishop of Emesa (Homs), had been appointed by the Jacobite Patriarch as his Legate in Europe, with the specific purpose of erecting an autocephalous British Patriarchate. To the objective observer, the so-called Council of London and its Acts are the stuff that the dreams are reminiscient of, an Arabian Nights tale. For none of the prelates who took part in its brief session could claim jurisdiction over more than perhaps a dozen followers, and some of the Churches had only a paper existence. They did, on the other hand, take themselves quite seriously.

=== Formation of the Catholicate of the West ===
By a declaration dated 23 March 1944, the Ancient British Church, the British Orthodox Catholic Church, and the Old Catholic Orthodox Church merged into a new body; the official name of this new body was: The Western Orthodox Catholic Church. This denomination was soon after its creation renamed to Catholicate of the West by Patriarch Abdullah III. No church of the East gave its recognition to the Catholicate of the West, nor made any submission to Abdullah III.

The first Catholicos of the West—head of the Catholicate of the West—was Hugh George de Willmott Newman, also called Mar Georgius. He was initially episcopally ordained by Abdullah III on 10 April 1944 under the name and title: Mar Georgius, Archbishop and Metropolitan of the Holy Metropolis of Glastonbury, the Occidental Jerusalem, and Catholicos of the West. Thereafter, Mar Jacobus II stepped down from his office of fifth patriarch of the Ancient British Church, passing his rank of patriarch to Willmott Newman; thus Willmott Newman was both Catholicos of the West and the sixth patriarch of the Ancient British Church. Mar Jacobus II died in 1947.

On 14 July 1945, Patriarch Abdullah III and Newman mutually agreed that the Catholicate of the West and its head would be completely independent, that this catholicate would not be under the jurisdiction of Abdullah III and would only be under the jurisdiction of the Catholicos of the West. Thus, "[i]t was decreed that the Catholicate was an autocephalous and autonomous Church or Rite, under its own Catholicos and subject to no other jurisdiction".

=== Glastonbury rite and confession created ===
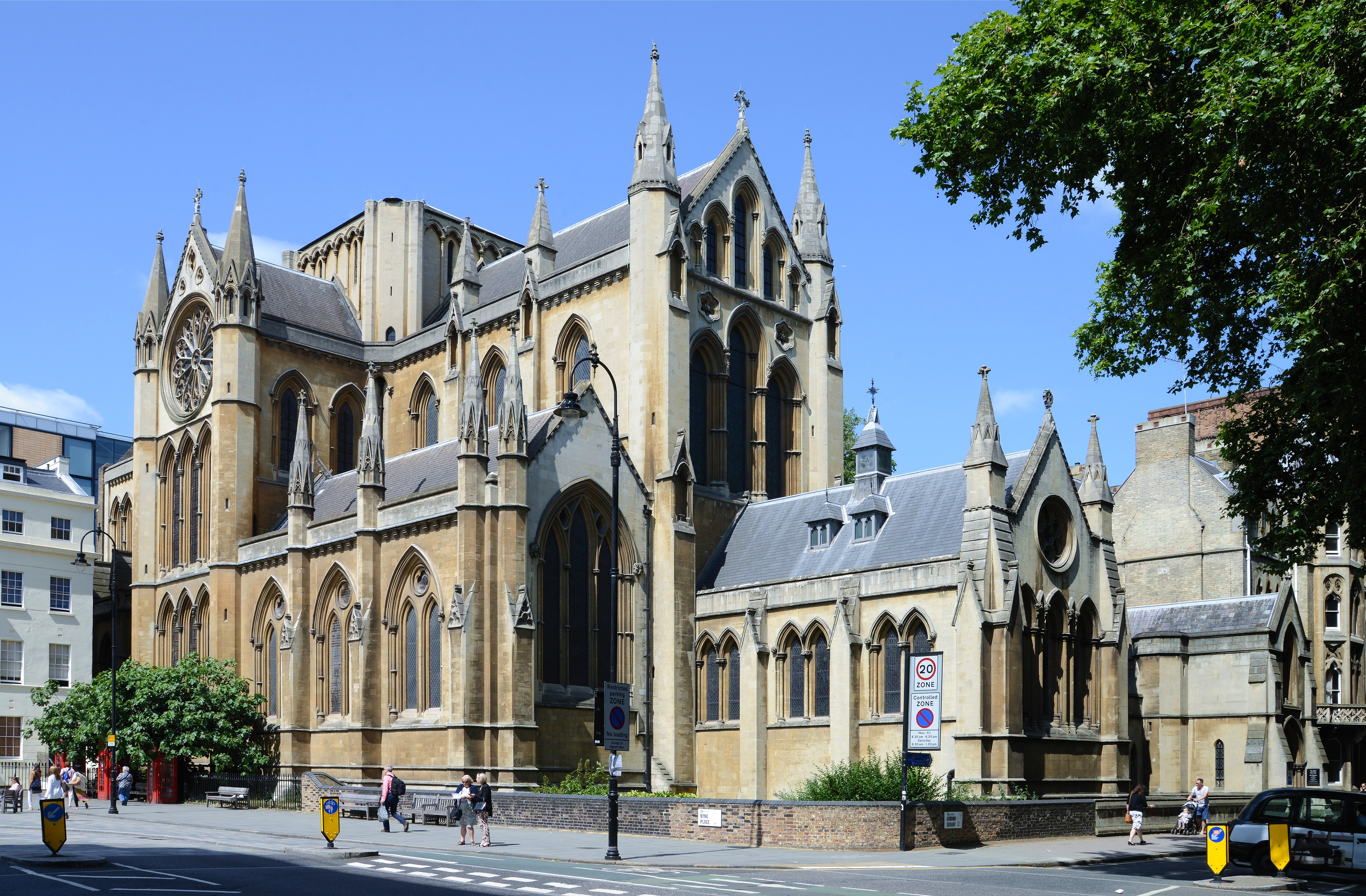
Newman's Glastonbury rite was influenced by the Irvingites, headquartered at the Church of Christ the King, Bloomsbury

By 1948, the Glastonbury rite was created for the Catholicate of the West. The Glastonbury rite was compiled by Newman in 8 volumes of liturgical books. The rite was mainly based on the Irvingite book The Liturgy and other Divine Offices of the Church with interpolated extracts from other liturgies. The goal of Newman in making this rite was to make the world's richest, most fastuous rite. The Glastonbury rite (also called "liturgy of saint Joseph of Arimathea") is a neo-Gallican rite which was an attempt to make a Western Orthodox rite.

On 1 June 1952, Newman published a book titled The Glastonbury Confession, (Note: Full title: The Glastonbury confession (confessio Glastoniensis) being the dogmatic constitution of the Catholic Apostolic Church (Catholicate of the West); a 2nd ed. was published in 1960) a profession of faith which was binding for all clergy within the Catholicate of the West. Anson states there were "few bishops and clergy" left within the Catholicate at the time; and between 1951 and 1953, the following churches under the jurisdiction of the Catholicate of the West severed communion: the Orthodox Catholic Church in England (expelled from the Catholicate in August 1951), the Ancient Catholic Church, and the Indian Orthodox Church.

=== Dissolution and official continuation ===
In 1953, Newman held a synod at Glastonbury; and the synod decided to dissolve the Catholicate of the West. The dissolution was done in order for the Indian law to accept the dissolution of the Indian Orthodox Church that had been under the catholicos from 1950 until 1951–1953. To replace the Catholicate of the West, an organisation was created called the United Orthodox Catholicate—still headed by Newman. By the time the synod of dissolution was held, the catholicate "had shrunk to three Provinces: (1) Britain, (2) Belgium, Holland, and Luxembourg, (3) Germany, and a French Mission". The United Orthodox Catholic Rite took the title of Catholicate of the West from 1959 and onward. Those "puzzling manoeuvres" were made to put an end to the system of "autocephalous tropoi" of the catholicate, (Note: Anson never explains what this system consisted of.) something which "could be done legally only by dissolving the corporation and starting de novo".

By 1959, the Catholicate of the West only had only six bishops left, and the catholicate's twelve eparchies, Anson notes, were "little more than half-forgotten memories". In 1960, Bishop Boltwood left the Catholicate of the West.

By 1964, the Catholicate had never applied to become part of the World Council of Churches, nor was it ever invited to join it; and at one point under Newman, the Catholicate of the West became known as the Orthodox Church of the British Isles.

=== Death of Newman, end of the catholicate ===
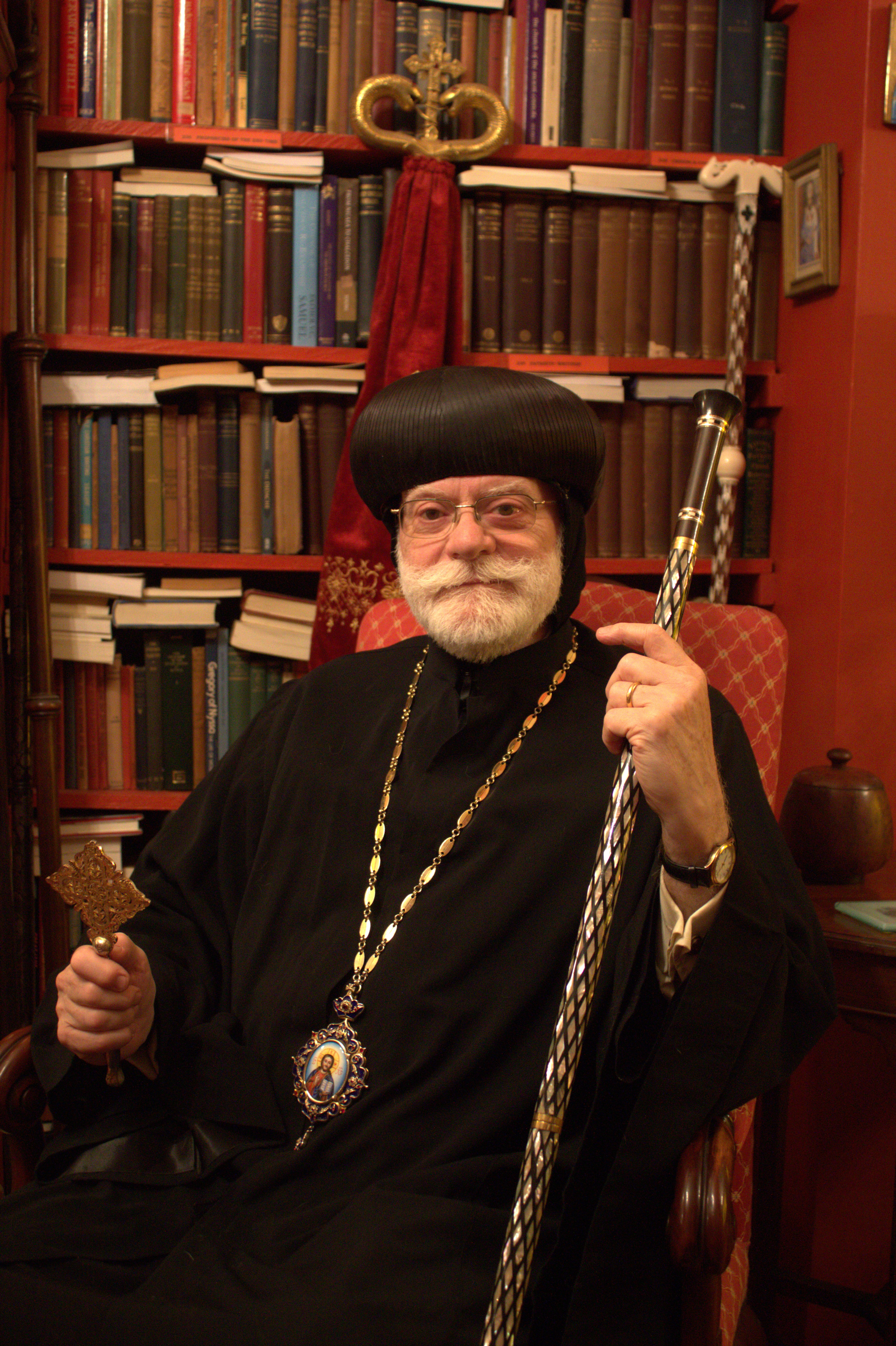
Mar Seraphim of the British Orthodox Church, successor of Hugh George de Willmott Newman in the Catholicate of the West

In 1979, "Hugh George de Willmott Newman (1905–1979), [...] patriarch of Glastonbury [...], commonly known as Mar Georgius" died. He was succeeded as the patriarch of Glastonbury by William Henry Hugo Newman-Norton (Mar Seraphim) from 1979 to 1994. Previously, in 1977, Newman-Norton was appointed as perpetual coadjutor for the Catholicate of the West (Orthodox Church of the British Isles) under Mar Georgius. In 1971, he was ordained priest by his uncle, Mar Georgius.

In 1994, the Orthodox Church of the British Isles (formerly named Catholicate of the West)—led by William Henry Hugo Newman-Norton—joined the Coptic Orthodox Church of Alexandria; Newman-Norton was chrismated and seated as bishop of the Coptic Orthodox Church. Thus, in 1994, the Patriarchate of Glastonbury of Willmot Newman's succession ceased to exist.

Some clergy members of the Orthodox Church of the British Isles refused to join the Coptic Church and therefore left the Orthodox Church of the British Isles; some joined into the Celtic Orthodox Church. The Orthodox Church of the British Isles thus became the British Orthodox Church by joining the Coptic Church within Oriental Orthodoxy.

=== Continuation claims ===
According to one continuation claimant—led by Independent Catholic bishop John Kersey—the Catholicate of the West's existence persisted in 1976 when "Mar David, (Note: Real name: William David de Ortega Maxey or Wallace David de Ortega Maxey) erstwhile Apostolic Primate of the Iberians in the Catholicate of the West", claimed that "the purported dissolution had neither been lawful nor effective and that the Catholicate of the West had continued to exist independently of Mar Georgius".

Wallace David de Ortega Maxey (Mar David) resigned from the Catholicate of the West around 1950; and when he returned to the independent sacramental movement, Mar David founded the Catholic Christian Church in 1970. Kersey and his organisation claimed that Mar David returned to the Catholicate of the West in 1976.

"In 1977, the then-Patriarch of Malaga, Mar David I" merged his Catholicate of the West with the Apostolic Episcopal Church, of which he was also primate. Since then, "[t]he Prince-Abbot of San Luigi succeeded to the primacy of the Catholicate of the West and the Apostolic Episcopal Church in 2015". Through the Abbey-Principality of San Luigi and the Catholicate of the West, Kersey also became a claimant successor to the prelacy of the Order of Corporate Reunion, Order of Antioch, the Order of Holy Wisdom, the American World Patriarchates, and dispenser of the Vilatte orders.

== Organisation ==
The Catholicate of the West was organised into several autocephalous patriarchates and dioceses or eparchies. The Catholicate of the West had been divided into eight dioceses by March 1947:

1. Patriarchal Archdiocese of Glastonbury (counties of Somerset, Wilts, Dorset, Hants, Surrey, London, Middlesex), headed by Newman (Patriarch Mar Georgius) with his assistants (Mar Joannes, titular bishop of St Marylebone, and Mar Benignus, titular bishop of Mere)
2. Diocese of Selsey (Sussex), headed by Mar Jacobus II
3. Diocese of Siluria (Principality of Wales and county of Monmouth), headed by Mar Hedley
4. Diocese of Mercia (Berks and Oxon), headed by Mar Theodorus
5. Diocese of Repton (counties of Derby, Stafford, Cheshire, Lancashire), headed by Mar David
6. Diocese of Minster (Kent and Essex), headed by Mar Francis
7. Diocese of Deira (County of York), headed by Mar Adrianus
8. Diocese of Verulam (Hertfordshire), headed by Mar John

"All the rest of the British Isles remained under the personal jurisdiction of Mar Georgius, pending the erection of more dioceses".

By a bull dated 27 July 1947, Newman "erected a small group of ex-Latin Catholics in Belgium" into a rite "under his own jurisdiction. This new body was given the name of L'Église Catholique du Rite Dominicain".

The catholicate had also been divided, by the 12 November 1947 or by 1948, into 12 eparchies (later called "apostolikes") representing the 12 tribes of the spiritual Israel. Those eparchies were "constituted on a general basis of the origins, races, and languages of Europe and Asia Minor in the days of the Undivided Church. Territories since discovered were regarded as 'suburbs' of the nations mainly responsible for their development". Those eparchies were each to be led by an apostolic primate; only three of the 12 eparchies had an apostolic primate. The 12 eparchies were the eparchies:

1. of all Britons (British Isles and British overseas possessions outside of America), headed by the Patriarchate of Glastonbury
2. of all the Iberians (Spain, Portugal, Portuguese overseas possessions, Andorra and the Americas), headed by the Patriarchate of Malaga
3. of all the Frisians (Netherlands and Indonesia), headed by the Patriarchate of Amersfoort
4. of all the Helvetians (Switzerland and the Principality of Lichtenchtein)
5. of all the Latins (Italy, Italian overseas possessions, Vatican City, San Marino)
6. of all the Franks (France, French overseas possessions, Belgium and its overseas possessions, and the Principality of Monaco)
7. of all the Teutons (Germany, and the Free City of Danzig)
8. of all the Pannonians (Austria and Czechoslovakia)
9. of all the Slavs (Russia, Poland, and the Baltic States)
10. of all the Turanians (Hungary, Finland, and Turkey)
11. of all the Scandinavians (Denmark, Norway, Sweden, Iceland, and Greenland)
12. of all the Levantines (Greece, Albania, the Balkan States, Asia Minor, and Egypt)

Five church courts of the catholicate were set up near Kew Gardens: the Diocesan Tribunal, the Provincial Tribunal, the Exarchal Tribunal, the Patriarchal Tribunal, and the Supreme Ecclesiastical Tribunal.

== Doctrine ==
The Catholicate of the West considered itself to be one of the churches along with all churches with a valid apostolic succession to compose the one, holy, catholic, and apostolic Church.

On 17 January 1947, the Holy Governing Synod of the Catholicate issued a decree which stated it rejected the Filioque and had removed it from the Nicene Creed of the catholicate.

In 1955, the catholicate adopted its Chapter and Organic Constitution. The Chapter's article VI states:

This Rite [the Catholicate of the West] is not autogenic, but is [...] the direct spiritual heir of the Ancient Celtic Church, established at Glastonbury in A.D. 37, immediately after the Passion of Christ by Joseph of Arimathea, and afterwards extended into the Celtic and other lands of the Western Christendom, and restored in 1866 upon the authority of the Syrian-Orthodox Patriarchate of Antioch; and in the East represents the remnant of the Syro-Chaldean Christians of St Thomas, derived from the preaching of the blessed Apostle St Thomas in the first century, and reorganised in 1862 upon the authority of the Syro-Chaldean Patriarchal See of Seleucia-Ctesiphon. This Rite is also the Repository of the mission conferred upon the late Archbishop Arnold Harris Matthew in 1908 by the Old Catholic Archiepiscopal See of Utrecht. By virtue of its threefold continuity and mission aforesaid, this Rite is not a sect or a schism, but a lawful and canonical Rite within the Church Universal.

In 1961, an official publication of the denomination, Maranatha (see Maranatha), stated the church "has no connections whatsoever with Old Roman Catholicism, Anglicanism, or with any psychic cult, in any shape of form, but it is in all respects Catholic, Apostolic, and Orthodox, having valid Orders, Mission and Jurisdiction as an Autocephalous Rite within THE ONE HOLY CATHOLIC AND APOSTOLIC CHURCH".

== See also ==
- Celtic Orthodox Church
- Catholic Christian Church
- Independent sacramental movement
