= Apostolic Episcopal Church =

- Classification: Western Christianity
- Orientation: Anglicanism and Old Catholicism
- Polity: Episcopal
- Primate: John Kersey
- Associations: American World Patriarchates; Catholicate of the West; Order of Corporate Reunion
- Founder: Arthur Wolfort Brooks
- Origin: 1925
- Separated from: Episcopal Church (United States) and Chaldean Catholic Church
- Missions: 11
- Clergy: 16
- Other names: Holy Eastern Catholic and Apostolic Orthodox Church
- Official website: https://apostolicepiscopalchurch.org

The Apostolic Episcopal Church (AEC), officially the Holy Eastern Catholic and Apostolic Orthodox Church, is an Anglican and Independent Old Catholic Christian denomination founded by Arthur Wolfort Brooks.

== History ==
The Apostolic Episcopal Church was founded by former Episcopalian priest, Arthur Wolfort Brooks, in 1925. He was consecrated as bishop in May 1925. Previously, in 1924, he established the Anglican Universal Church with George Winslow Plummer of the First Rosicrucian Church in America and Societas Rosicruciana in America. By 1927, Brooks and Plummer parted ways; and by 1932, the AEC was officially organized. In 1935, it claimed 7,892 members, 23 clergy, and 19 churches.

In 1941, Brooks welcomed then-priest Hugh George de Willmott Newman into the AEC. He would then create the Old Catholic Orthodox Church through Newman for England.

In 1943, the Apostolic Episcopal Church's bishops met with the prelates from the Ancient British Church, the British Orthodox Catholic Church, the Old Catholic Orthodox Church, the Order of Holy Wisdom, and the Order of Antioch. These churches established the Council of London which repudiated the 1938 decree of Ignatius Aphrem I of the Syriac Orthodox Church of Antioch which rejected any relationship with churches descending from Jules Ferrette or Joseph Rene Vilatte's claims to apostolic succession. They would become the Catholicate of the West, initially under the jurisdiction of William Bernard Crow.

In 1946, the AEC merged with the Ancient Christian Fellowship, and Brooks was succeed in leadership by Wallace David de Ortega Maxey in 1948. According to The Annals of the American Academy of Political and Social Science, by 1948, the church's membership was 6,389. A year later, Maxey resigned from the AEC and the Catholicate of the West. He would be succeeded by Matthew Nicholas Nelson and Lowell Paul Wadle.

In 1969, Perry Nikolaus Cedarholm succeeded as archbishop and primate of the AEC. Cedarholm would be succeeded in 1977 by Nils Bertil Alexander Persson. According to a claimed successor to the Catholicate of the West and Order of Corporate Reunion, Persson was succeeded by Francis Spataro, and then by John Kersey in 2015.

== Statistics ==
In 1935, the Apostolic Episcopal Church claimed 7,892 members, 23 clergy, and 19 churches; from 2002 to 2004, the AEC had grown to 18,000 members, 320 clergy, and 250 churches; and by 2006, its membership declined to 12,000 members, grew to 255 clergy, yet declined with 250 churches. As of September 2026—according to the claimant successor of the Catholicate of the West and Order of Corporate Reunion—the AEC had at least 20 clergy and religious; and a presence in 15 missions throughout the United Kingdom, the Americas, Scandinavia, Denmark, Sweden, and Norway; and by November 2026, it had 11 missions and 16 clergy.

== See also ==
- Catholicate of the West
- Episcopus vagans
- Independent Catholicism
- Order of Corporate Reunion
