= George Winslow Plummer =

Rosicrucian

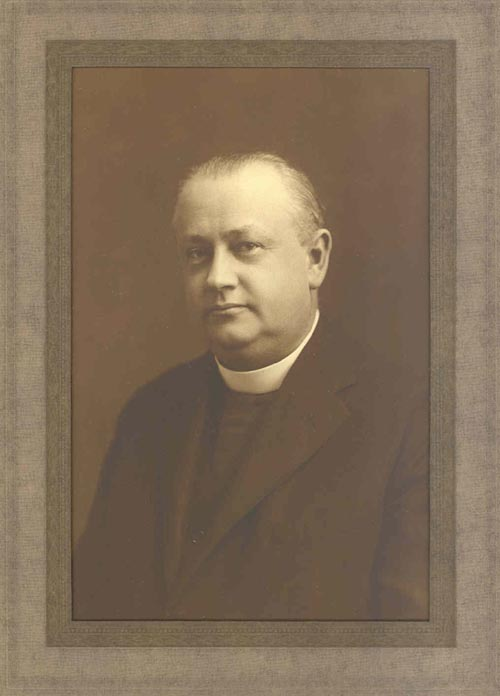
- George Winslow Plummer
- Born: August 26, 1876
- Died: January 23, 1944 (aged 67)
- Occupation: Rosicrucian leader

George Winslow Plummer (August 26, 1876 – January 23, 1944) was Imperator and Supreme Magus of the Societas Rosicruciana in America (SRIA) from 1909 to 1944. Under his auspices the organization was given its contemporary structure. The title was passed on to him by Frater Sylvester Clark Gould (March 1, 1840 - July 19, 1909) in New York, from whom he received full initiation and authority to begin the work. Plummer held this office until his death on January 23, 1944. Plummer also served in the independent sacramental movement as bishop over the First Rosicrucian Church of America.

== Biography ==
Plummer was born on August 26, 1876. He grew up as a Roman Catholic.

In 1909, Plummer founded the First Rosicrucian Church of America, and was ordained as a priest through the Reformed Episcopal Church; and by 1918, he was consecrated as a bishop.

In 1924, he co-founded the Anglican Universal Church of Christ alongside Arthur Wolfort Brooks (who was still a priest in the Episcopal Church of the United States). By 1927, the two separated and Brooks would go on to establish the Apostolic Episcopal Church, which would be officially organized in 1932.

In 1934, Plummer was conditionally consecrated by Ignatius Nichols and merged his church with Nichols' Independent Eastern Orthodox body. He died on January 23, 1944.
