= Lewisham Town Hall =

Municipal building in London, England

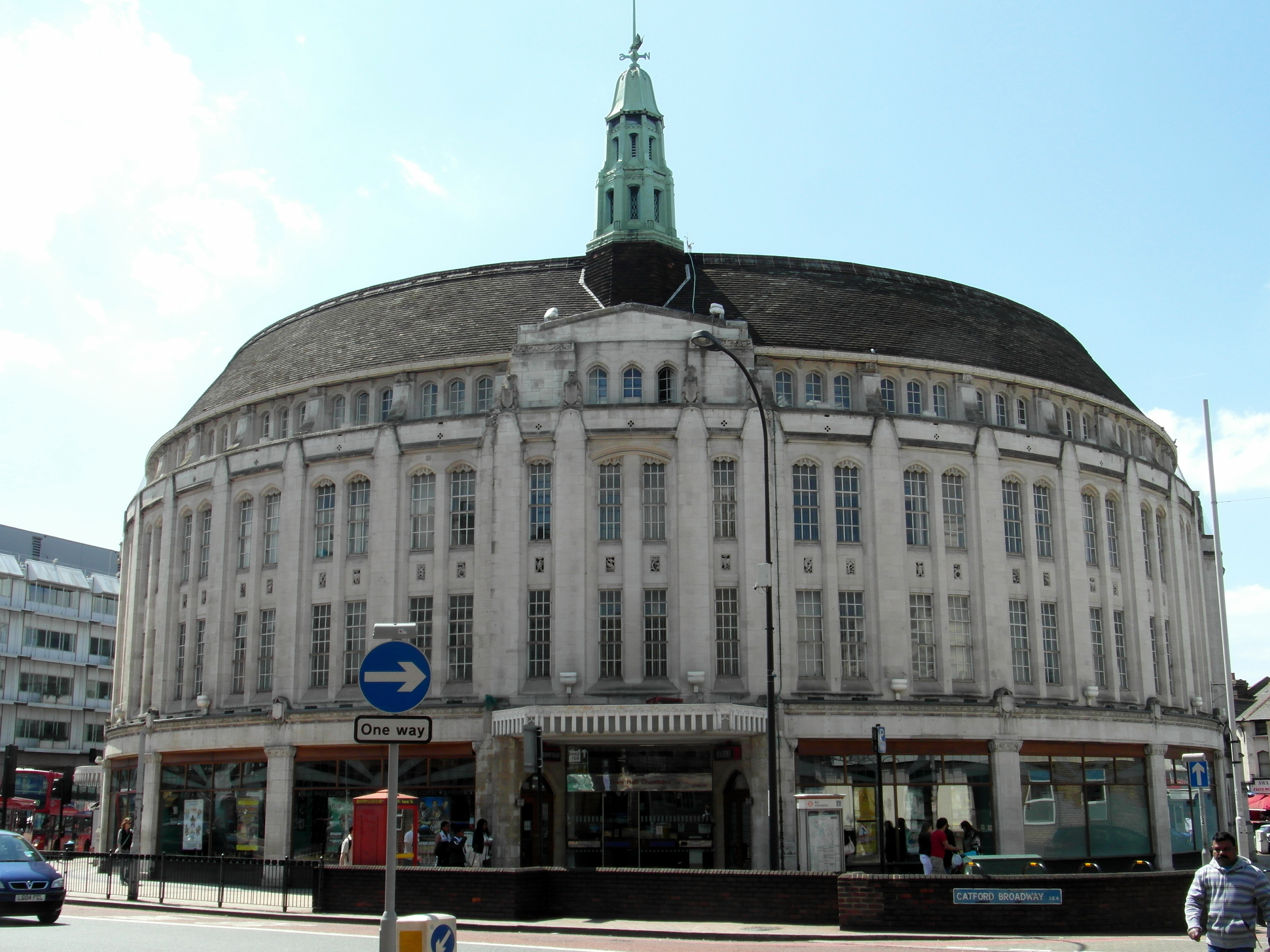
- Lewisham Town Hall

- Shown in Lewisham
- 51.4452°N 0.0208°W
- Location: Catford Road, Lewisham

History
- Built: 1932

Site notes
- Architect: Bradshaw Gass & Hope
- Architectural style: Art Deco style

Listed Building – Grade II
- Designated: 21 December 1993
- Reference no.: 1253065

Lewisham Town Hall is a municipal building in Catford Road, Lewisham, London. The oldest part of the facility, the curved former municipal offices and adjoining concert hall of 1932, is a Grade II listed building. The complex also includes newer wings from the 1950s to 1970s; those serve as the headquarters of Lewisham London Borough Council.

== History ==
The building has its origins in a local vestry hall commissioned for the benefit of the Parish of St Laurence. The foundation stone for the vestry hall was laid by the Chairman of the Board of Works, James Brooker, on 27 July 1874. The vestry hall was designed by George Elkington in the Gothic style, completed in 1875 and was extended to accommodate the headquarters of the new Metropolitan Borough of Lewisham in 1901.

In the late 1920s civic leaders considered that additional facilities were needed accommodate the work of the borough. They resolved to create a curved structure, designed by Bradshaw Gass & Hope in the Art Deco style, incorporating a concert hall, to the east of the vestry hall. The construction work, which was carried out by G. E. Wallis & Sons began in May 1930. The design involved a symmetrical main frontage with 23 bays facing onto Rushey Green; the central section of four bays featured a doorway with canopy above on the ground floor; there were a series of tall windows interspersed with pilasters on the first and second floors and a series of smaller triple-arched windows on the third floor; an octagonal cupola with weather vane was erected on the roof. This structure, referred to as the "town hall extension" was officially opened by the Duke of York on 22 June 1932.

During the Second World War, an inquiry into the circumstances surrounding the bombing of Sandhurst Road School by enemy aircraft on 20 January 1943, which resulted in deaths of 38 children and 6 staff, was held in the town hall.

A further extension in the form of a long curved block of offices to the north west was designed by the borough architect, Maurice Forward, in the Modernist style and built in the late 1950s and early 1960s. The complex continued to be headquarters of the Metropolitan Borough of Lewisham for much of the 20th century and continued to be the local seat of government after the enlarged London Borough of Lewisham in 1965.

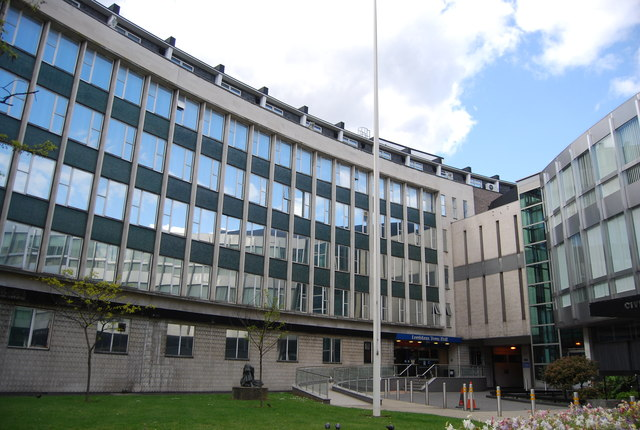
Main front of the Town Hall in modern usage, comprising the 1950s/60s offices (left) and 1970s civic suite (right)

A local activist, 13-year-old William Norton, had led a petition which was supported by John Betjeman to save the original vestry hall in August 1961. However, the new civic leaders insisted that the vestry hall had to be demolished in 1968 to make way for a civic suite, comprising a new council chamber, committee rooms and mayor's parlour, which was designed by Allan Sutton and completed in November 1971. Meanwhile, on the south side of Catford Road, St Laurence's Church was also demolished in 1968 to make way for an additional office block for council use known as St Laurence's House. A replacement church was built 200 metres away. A statue by Gerda Rubinstein entitled Pensive Girl was unveiled outside the building in 1992.

Protesters forced themselves into the town hall during demonstrations against council spending reductions in November 2010.

In 2020 the council vacated the 1932 municipal offices, by then known as Town Hall Chambers, having consolidated its offices in the post-1950s parts of the building and at Laurence House opposite. The Town Hall Chambers was subsequently let out as private offices.

== Gallery ==
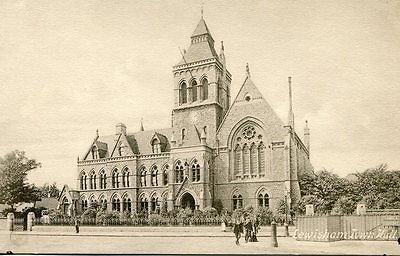
The old vestry hall c. 1900

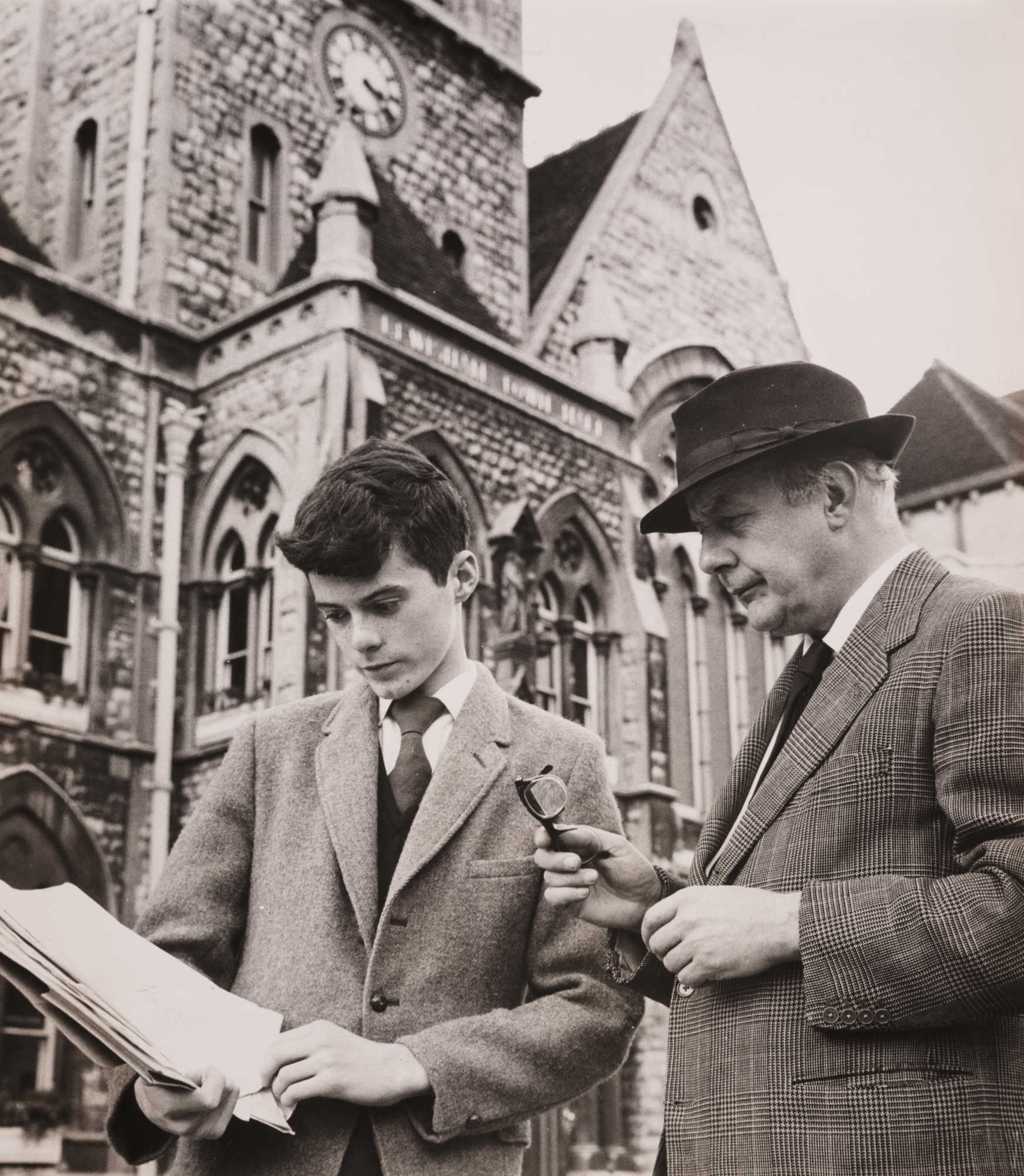
John Betjeman reads William Norton's petition to save the vestry hall (which can be seen in the background), 23 August 1961

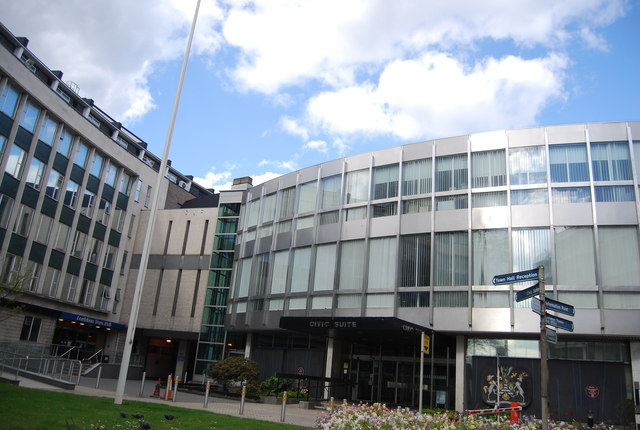
The "Civic Suite" completed in 1971
