= Wallace David de Ortega Maxey =

American pastor and activist (1902–1992)

- Bishop
- Church: Catholicate of the West

Orders
- Ordination: 1923 by Joseph Rene Vilatte
- Consecration: 1927 by William Montgomery Brown

Personal details
- Born: February 22, 1902
- Died: March 12, 1992 (aged 90)
- Occupation: Pastor

Wallace David de Ortega Maxey (February 22, 1902 – March 12, 1992) was an Independent Catholic, Universalist, Theosophist, and gay rights activist in the United States.

== Biography ==
Ortega Maxey was born on February 22, 1902. By 1923, he was ordained a priest by Joseph Rene Vilatte of the American Catholic Church. He would be consecrated as bishop 4 years later by William Montgomery Brown, before receiving several conditional consecrations after.

During the 1930s, Maxey worked with an Episcopal parish, and by 1937 was left "bound and beaten" after he was "accosted by two men as he left a taxi to enter his apartment". In 1937, he was also deposed as a deacon from the Episcopal Church in the United States.

From 1944 to 1949, he would serve as president and pastor of the Ancient Christian Fellowship; and by 1946, the Ancient Christian Fellowship merged with the Apostolic Episcopal Church. He would later resign from the Apostolic Episcopal Church and Catholicate of the West, being succeeded by Matthew Nicholas Nelson and Lowell Paul Wadle.

In 1958, Maxey published Man Is a Sexual Being and by 1964, was given a 15-year jail term and $19,000 fine for distributing "an obscene book" by mail and common carrier.

Maxey became a Unitarian Universalist in the 1950s and hosted gay-themed events at the First Universalist Church of Los Angeles.

In 1970, he returned to the independent sacramental movement and founded the Catholic Christian Church.

Maxey died on March 12, 1992 in Fresno, California.

== See also ==
- Apostolic Episcopal Church
- Catholicate of the West
- Independent Catholicism
