= William Bernard Crow =

- Bishop
- Church: Catholicate of the West

Orders
- Ordination: 1942 by Frederick Charles Aloysius Harrington
- Consecration: 1943 by Herbert James Monzani Heard

Personal details
- Born: 11 September 1895
- Died: 28 June 1976 (aged 80)
- Occupation: Pastor

William Bernard Crow (1895–1976) was an independent sacramental bishop, founder of the Order of Holy Wisdom, and ceremonialist magician.

== Biography ==
Crow was born in 1895, and by 1942, he established the kabbalistic Order of Holy Wisdom for occultists and Theosophists interested in "orthodox Catholic faith".

In 1943, he was consecrated to the episcopacy by Herbert James Monzani Heard of the Ancient British Church. By October 1943, alongside representatives from the Ancient British Church, the British Orthodox Catholic Church, Apostolic Episcopal Church, Old Catholic Orthodox Church, the Order of Antioch and his Order of Holy Wisdom; Crow was elected as patriarch of Antioch in schism with the Syriac Orthodox Church.

These representatives, along with Crow, repudiated Miaphysite Christology and Jansenism; and their churches would enter full communion, merging into the Catholicate of the West.

Under his authority, Hugh George de Willmott Newman was elected as first catholicos for the new Christian denomination. By 1945, it was mutually agreed that the Catholicate of the West would receive autocephaly from Crow's jurisdiction.

In 1976, Crow died and was succeeded in the Order of Holy Wisdom by William Henry Hugo Newman Norton, who would later renounce his affiliations and join the Coptic Orthodox Church.
