= Celtic Orthodox Church =

Autocephalous Christian church

- Classification: Non-Chalcedonian
- Orientation: Eastern Christianity
- Theology: Oriental Orthodox theology
- Polity: Episcopal
- Associations: Communion of Western Orthodox Churches
- Liturgy: Western Rite Orthodox
- Branched from: Catholicate of the West
- Official website: https://celticorthodoxfaith.com/

The Celtic Orthodox Church (COC; French: Église orthodoxe celtique), also called the Holy Celtic Church, is an autocephalous Christian church in the Western Rite and Oriental Orthodox traditions founded in the 20th century in France.

Since 25 December 2007, the Celtic Orthodox Church has been in communion with the French Orthodox Church and the Orthodox Church of the Gauls, forming the Communion of Western Orthodox Churches (CWOC).

The Celtic Orthodox Church claims to be part of the Jules Ferrette episcopal succession line. It also claims historic continuity with ancient Celtic Christianity.

== History ==
=== Foundation ===
The Celtic Orthodox Church was founded in the 20th century by Jean-Pierre Danyel. He was ordained priest by the Mariavite bishop of France in 1951, after failing to obtain an ordination from any Russian, Romanian or Greek Orthodox bishop. However, he doubted the Eastern Orthodox and Catholic churches would recognize the validity of his ordination. Thus, he "received all the orders again on 1 March 1953" from Metropolitan Lutgen of Antwerp of the Église catholique du rite dominicain. Lutgen had received his episcopal consecration from Hugh George de Willmott Newman. After this, Danyel decided to work to restore the ancient Celtic Church of Brittany and took the name of one of the Christian founding saints of Brittany, Tugdual.

Danyel founded the Abbaye de la Saint Présence at Bois-Juhel, Saint-Dolay, "where he lived as a hermit in emulation of the ancient Celtic monks". He "soon attracted disciples" and was elected as the first bishop of the restored Celtic Church. He was consecrated bishop in 1957 by Archbishop Irenaeus of Arles (Comte Charles-Borromée d'Eschevannes), primate of the Sainte Église catholique Gallicane autocéphale. Danyel received the title of "Bishop of Redon". On 19 December 1959, Danyel proclaimed himself metropolitan under the title Tugdual I, Archbishop of Dôl. Danyel "revived Druidic rites" and added to his title "Sa Blancheur l'Humble" ("His Whiteness the Humble") which he claimed was of Druidic origin. His full title was therefore: "His Whiteness the Humble Tugdual I, Archbishop of Dôl, Abbot of Saint-Dolay, Kayermo and Keroussek, primate of the Holy Celtic Church, President of all the non-Roman Christian and Apostolic Churches".

In 1963 or 1964, the organisation consisted of 10 bishops and two to three lay people. The church was called at the time the Sainte Église celtique en Bretagne (Holy Celtic Church in Brittany).

=== Death of the founder to today ===
On 11 August 1968, Danyel died. After his death, his hermitage was abandoned.

In 1977, three monks who were from an abbey in Montpellier founded by a Celtic Orthodox priest, Paul-Edouard de Fournier de Brescia in 1973, came to the hermitage and built a church on the site. By 1979, the Celtic Orthodox Church was part of the Orthodox Church of the British Isles of William Henry Hugo Newman-Norton.

Paul-Edouard Fournier de Brescia was consecrated bishop under the name Mael in 1980 by the primate of the Celtic Orthodox Church, bishop Seraphim (Newman-Norton).

The Orthodox Church of the British Isles and the Celtic Orthodox Church split in 1994, when under Mar Seraphim (William Henry Hugo Newman-Norton) the Orthodox Church of the British Isles joined the Coptic Orthodox Church and changed its name to British Orthodox Church. The Celtic Orthodox Church and some other groups previously under the Orthodox Church of the British Isles remained independent.

With the departure of Mar Seraphim, the Celtic Orthodox Church had no primate. Mael was elected primate of the Celtic Orthodox Church by its Holy Synod in 1994 and remained as such until his death in 2014. The current primate is since 2014 Metropolitan Marc (Jean Claude Scheerens).

In 1996, the Celtic Orthodox Church canonised Danyel, its founder.

== Jurisdiction ==
The Celtic Orthodox Church has a presence in North America, Europe, and Australia. Within the United States of America, it has 1 church and 2 chapels; in Europe, it has a monastery in France; 3 churches in the United Kingdom; 1 church in Switzerland; and 1 church in Australia.

== See also ==
- Ancient British Church in North America
- Neo-Celtic Christianity
