= Abba Seraphim =

British Oriental Orthodox bishop (1948–2025)

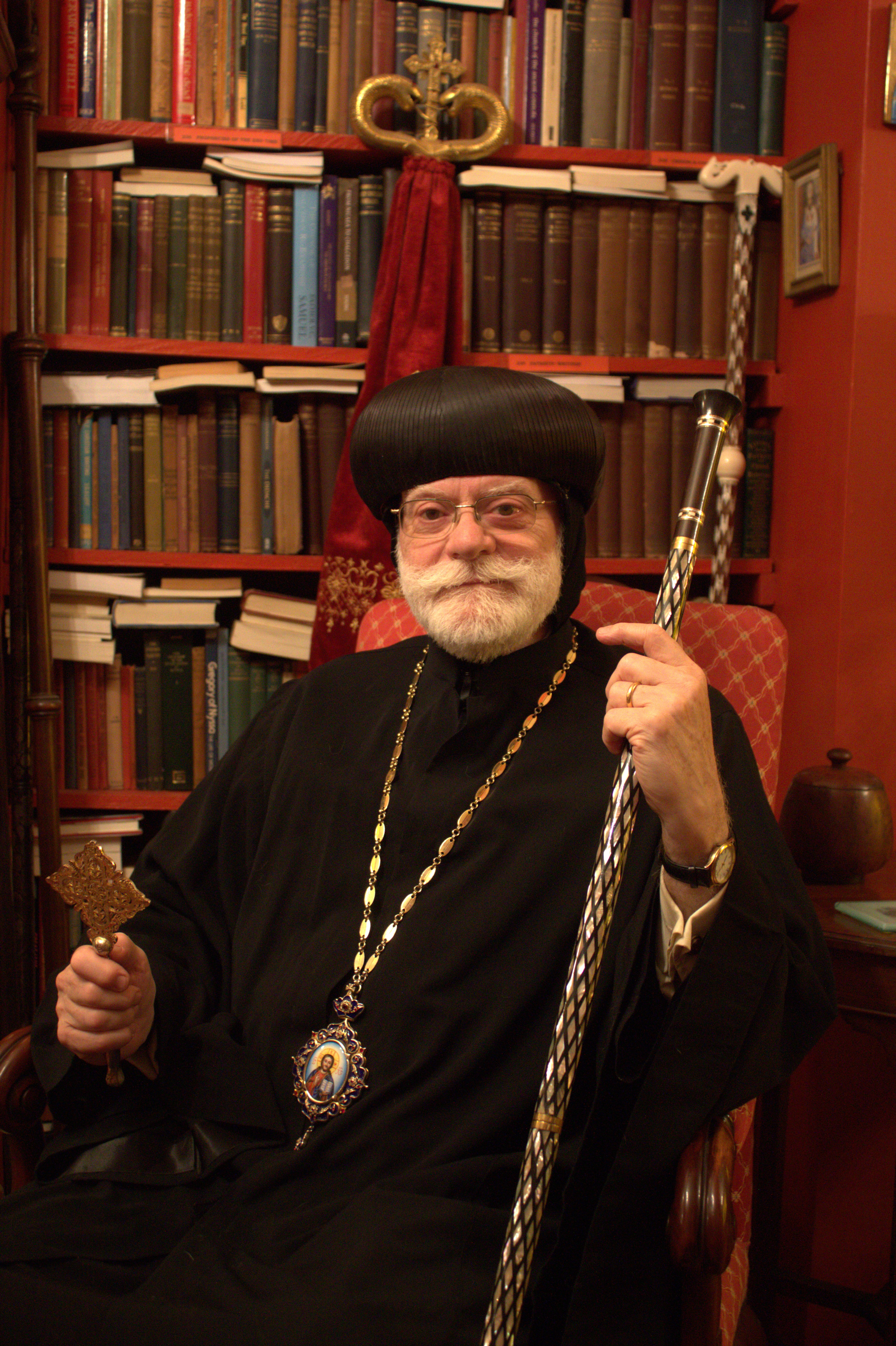
- William Newman-Norton in 2017
- Church: British Orthodox Church
- Metropolis: Metropolis of Glastonbury
- See: Glastonbury, United Kingdom
- Appointed: 28 February 1979
- Predecessor: Mar Georgius
- Successor: Jacobus III

Orders
- Rank: Patriarch

Personal details
- Born: William Henry Hugo Newman-Norton; 27 February 1948
- Died: 12 November 2025 (aged 77) London, England
- Denomination: Independent Oriental Orthodox

William Henry Hugo Newman-Norton (27 February 1948 – 12 November 2025) was a British independent Oriental Orthodox bishop. He was the Patriarch of Glastonbury and head of the British Orthodox Church (BOC) with the title of British Patriarch and was known as Abba Seraphim.

In 1975, Norton also succeeded William Bernard Crow as head of the Order of the Holy Wisdom.

== Background ==
Norton was born on 27 February 1948.

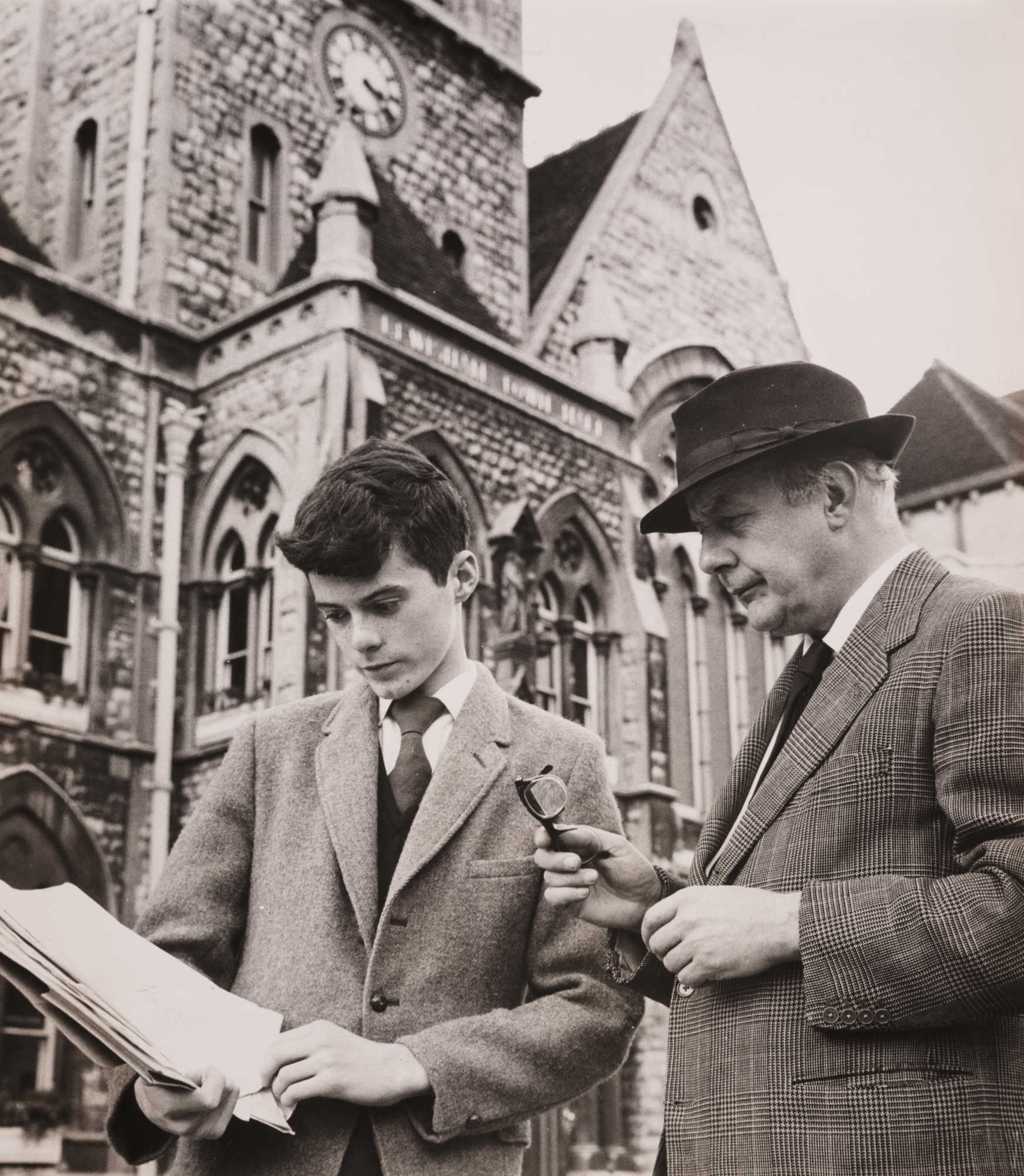
John Betjeman reads Norton's petition to save Lewisham Town Hall, 23 August 1961

In August 1961, when Norton was just 13 years old, he led a petition which was supported by the poet, writer and broadcaster John Betjeman to save the original vestry hall of Lewisham Town Hall. However, the new civic leaders insisted that the vestry hall had to be demolished in 1968 to make way for a "Civic Suite" which was designed by A. Sutton and completed in November 1971.

In the 1986 Greenwich London Borough Council election, Norton stood for election as a Conservative candidate in the Woolwich Common ward; he finished last of six candidates, with 299 votes.

He was also Vice Chairman and a Trustee of the Lewisham Local History Society.

Norton died at his home in London, on 12 November 2025, at the age of 77. He had been diagnosed with Alzheimer's disease five years prior.

== Ministry ==
=== Priesthood, Catholicate of the West ===
On 27 February 1971, Norton was ordained priest by his uncle, Hugh George de Willmott Newman, with co-ordainers Peter Martin Smethurst and Michel France Marie Raoult. On 9 July 1977, the same three people consecrated him bishop, with Newman as main consecrator.

In 1979, Norton succeeded Newman as head of the Catholicate of the West which was sometimes called Orthodox Church of the British Isles.

=== In the Coptic Patriarchate ===
The Orthodox Church of the British Isles split from the Celtic Orthodox Church in 1994, under Mar Seraphim (Norton): the Orthodox Church of the British Isles joined the Coptic Orthodox Church and changed its name to British Orthodox Church.

On 6 April 1994, a protocol enacting the merger of the Orthodox Church of the British Isles into the Coptic Orthodox Church was signed by both parties. The Orthodox Church of the British Isles, headed by Norton, changed its name to British Orthodox Church for the union, and became "a diocese of the Coptic Orthodox Patriarchate of Alexandria with jurisdiction over the United Kingdom, the Republic of Ireland, the Isle of Man and the Channel Islands". The British Orthodox Church was distinct from the other communities in the British Isles of the Coptic Church.

Norton, primate of the British Orthodox Church, was not reordained, but received a chrismation. On 19 June 1994, Norton was consecrated as a Metropolitan in the Coptic Patriarchate by Pope Shenouda assisted by some seventy Metropolitans and Bishops. Norton then became a member of the Holy Synod of the Coptic Orthodox Church.

=== In the independent British Orthodox Church ===
On 4 October 2015, the Coptic Orthodox Patriarchate, in response to a request from the British Orthodox Church, agreed to the British church returning to its pre-1994 status as an independent jurisdiction, with Norton as primate. This action led to a restoration of the situation in which the British Orthodox Church was not in communion with any of the Oriental Orthodox churches.

On 7 January 2019, it was announced that Metropolitan Seraphim (Norton) would be once again considered as Patriarch, and referred to as "His Beatitude". Norton had ceased to use the title of Patriarch since union with the Coptic Orthodox Church out of courtesy to Pope Shenouda III. The church he led continues to be known as the British Orthodox Church. He is considered by the British Orthodox Church as its seventh patriarch.

== See also ==
- Coptic Orthodox Church in Britain and Ireland
