= Hugh George de Willmott Newman =

British independent bishop

His Sacred Beatitude Mar Georgius
- Patriarch of Glastonbury, Catholicos of the West, and sixth British Patriarch
- Hugh George de Willmott Newman, unknown date (image already published in 1964 in Anson, Peter F. (2006) [1964]. "The Catholicate of the West". Bishops at Large. Independent Catholic Heritage. Apocryphile press. page between p. 444 and 445.)

Orders
- Ordination: 23 October 1938 by James Columba McFall

Personal details
- Born: 17 January 1905 London, England
- Died: 28 February 1979 (aged 74)
- Denomination: Christianity
- Spouse: Lola Ina del Carpio Barnardo
- Occupation: Bishop

Hugh George de Willmott Newman (17 January 1905 – 28 February 1979) was an Independent Catholic or independent Old Catholic bishop. He was known religiously as Mar Georgius I and bore the titles, among others, of Patriarch of Glastonbury, Catholicos of the West, and sixth British Patriarch. He was the head of the Catholicate of the West from when he became a bishop, in 1944, until his death in 1979.

Newman was first consecrated bishop by occultist William Bernard Crow—the leader of the Order of Holy Wisdom—in 1944. Willmott Newman is notable for having subsequently undergone numerous ceremonies of conditional consecration, thereby laying claim to numerous different lines of historic apostolic succession. Over a ten-year period between 1944 and 1955, there were nine (or ten) ceremonies in each of which Newman and another bishop would reconsecrate each other to give each the other's lines of apostolic succession.

== Biography ==
=== Early life ===
Hugh George de Willmott Newman was born at Forest Gate, London, on 17 January 1905. He was baptized in the Catholic Apostolic Church in Hackney. His father and grandfather both had served as deacons in the Catholic Apostolic Church. From 7 to 30, Newman was an acolyte in the Catholic Apostolic Church.

In 1937 he married Lola Ina del Carpio Barnardo, great-niece of Thomas Barnardo, at the Catholic Apostolic Church in Maida Hill. Thereafter, he became general manager of the National Association of Cycle Traders and Repairers, a trade association of employers. He also edited the association's magazine, The National Journal.

=== Christian ministry ===
==== Priesthood ====
By 1938, Newman was "convinced of a clear call to the priesthood". He could not be ordained priest in the Catholic Apostolic Church, as the last of its twelve apostles, Henry Woodhouse, had died in 1901. In the summer of 1938, Newman wrote to propose himself to be ordained priest to Bishop James McFall, who styled himself as Regionary Old Catholic bishop for Ireland. McFall accepted Newman's request. McFall had been priest of the Old Roman Catholic Church in Great Britain (ORCGB) since 1910, and had been consecrated bishop there in 1916. Shortly after his consecration, Arnold Mathew excommunicated him. In April 1925, McFall became the "nominal head" of a splinter group from the ORCGB, which called itself the Old Catholic Orthodox Church and was composed of only laypeople. McFall died in 1960.

On 23 October 1938, at the age of 33, Newman received from Bishop James Columba McFall, who had come from Belfast to perform the following sacraments: baptism under condition, confirmation, the four minor orders, the subdiaconate and the diaconate, and the priesthood. "No sooner had [McFall] returned to Belfast than [sic] he released the newly ordained priest from his jurisdiction, and forgot all about him".

In early 1939, Newman was adopted as priest by the Old Catholic Orthodox Church, which could find no priest and whose groups were in Hounslow and South Harrow. He then tried to find a bishop for him and his flock. Newman asked "almost every free-lance prelate in Britain and Ireland" with no success. He then got in contact with Mar John Emmanuel (Arthur Wolfort Brooks), head of the Apostolic Episcopal Church, (Note: For more info on the Apostolic Episcopal Church (Holy Eastern Catholic and Apostolic Church) and its leader, see Melton, J. Gordon (2009). "Apostolic Episcopal Church-Order of Corporate Reunion". Melton's encyclopedia of American religions. Chapter 2 - Western Liturgical Family, Part I: The Western Catholic Tradition (8th ed.). Detroit: Gale Cengage Learning. p. 105. ISBN 978-0-7876-9696-2.) headquartered in New York, who accepted Newman's request and put Newman under his jurisdiction. John Emmanuel became the presiding bishop of the Old Orthodox Catholic Church in England.

By a document dated 26 October 1941, Newman was named abbot nullius of St Albans, in the Order of Corporate Reunion (OCR); the OCR had become a part of the Apostolic Episcopal Church in 1933. Newman's jurisdiction was limited to the 5 miles of St. Albans, but in cases of members of the OCR it extended over the whole Great Britain and Northern Ireland. Four days later, Newman was also appointed archpriest and Vicar-General of the Old Catholic Orthodox Church in Europe, with an unlimited jurisdiction. Anson notes that "[s]o far as is known, this was the first occasion that a lawfully married priest in England had ever been raised to the status of Abbot-Nullius".

Then, Newman and his wife left Northampton to move to Enfield Lock, in Middlesex, "where the curia of the Old Catholic Orthodox Church was set up".

During the spring of 1943, Newman also became secretary and registrar of the Incorporated Institute of Cycle Traders and Repairers.

==== Bishop and Catholicos ====
On 8 October 1943, a synod of clergy and laity of the Old Catholic Orthodox Church in Europe elected Newman to the episcopate as archbishop and metropolitan of Glastonbury. On 20 December of the same year, this decision was approved by the authorities of the Apostolic Episcopal Church. Mar John Emmanuel allowed bishop William Bernard Crow (named Mar Abdullah III) to perform Newman's episcopal consecration, because Emmanuel could not travel from the United States to England due to the Second World War. During the three months the letter of authorization took to reach the UK from the US, Newman became convinced the Old Catholic Orthodox Church was schismatic and redundant because the Ancient British Church was the real indigenous Church of England; Newman believed the Old Catholic Orthodox Church should be absorbed into the Ancient British Church, which was done on 23 March 1943.

On 10 April 1944, Newman was consecrated bishop by William Bernard Crow to be the head of the Catholicate of the West. The consecration took place at St Andrew's Collegiate Church in South Tottenham, London; at the time, this church was a Free Protestant Episcopal church and its use had been granted to Newman and Crow for the occasion. Newman was consecrated under the name and title: Mar Georgius, Archbishop and Metropolitan of the Holy Metropolis of Glastonbury, the Occidental Jerusalem, and Catholicos of the West. Thereafter, Mar Jacobus II stepped down from his office of fifth patriarch of the Ancient British Church, passing his rank of patriarch to Willmott Newman; thus Willmott Newman was both Catholicos of the West and the sixth patriarch of the Ancient British Church.

==== Independence ====
On 14 July 1945, Patriarch Abdullah III and Newman mutually agreed that the Catholicate of the West and its head were to be completely independent, that the catholicate would not be under the jurisdiction of Abdullah III and would only be under the jurisdiction of the Catholicos. "It was decreed that the Catholicate was an autocephalous and autonomous Church or Rite, under its own Catholicos and subject to no other jurisdiction".

==== Head of the Apostolic Episcopal Church ====
Mar John Emmanuel, head of the Apostolic Episcopal Church, died in 1948; he was succeeded as head of the Apostolic Episcopal Church by Wallace David de Ortega Maxey, who resigned in 1951. "His successor, Lowell Paul Wadle, served for two years and, following his resignation, was succeeded by Metropolitan Abp. Hugh George de Willmott Newman (1905-1979), the patriarch of Glastonbury".

==== Dissolution and continuation of the Catholicate ====
In 1953, Newman held a synod at Glastonbury; the synod decided to dissolve the Catholicate of the West. The dissolution was done in order for the Indian law to accept the dissolution of the Indian Orthodox Church that had been under the Catholicos from 1950 until 1951–3. To replace the Catholicate of the West, an organisation was created called the United Orthodox Catholicate, still headed by Newman. The United Orthodox Catholic Church took the title of Catholicate of the West from 1959 and onward. Those "puzzling manoeuvres" were made to put an end to the system of "autocephalous tropoi" (Note: Anson never explains what this system consisted of.) of the catholicate, something which "could be done legally only by dissolving the corporation and starting de novo".

=== Death and succession ===
Hugh George de Willmott Newman, "patriarch of Glastonbury [...], commonly known as Mar Georgius" died on 28 February 1979. He was succeeded as the head of the Apostolic Episcopal Church by William Henry Hugo Newman-Norton (Mar Seraphim) "who served as patriarch of Glastonbury from 1979 to 1994. In 1994 he was consecrated as a bishop of the Coptic Orthodox Church and resigned all affiliation with the Apostolic Episcopal Church". At the time of Mar Seraphim and the Catholicate of the West joining the Coptic Orthodox Church to form the British Orthodox Church, some congregants did not follow him and formed part of the Celtic Orthodox Church.

== Consecrations, re-consecrations ==
After his consecration as bishop and patriarch in 1944, Newman "was convinced that his first duty was to establish and secure a legitimate and validly ordained ministry in the full Catholic sense". In order to do so, he decided to receive as many lines of episcopal succession as he could through reconsecration. By doing this, he hoped he would have an episcopate which would not be questioned by any theologian and that he would create a link between the Eastern and Western Christianity. Newman claimed that since the day of his first consecration until 1955 included, he had received a total of 23 lines of succession and a total of at least 10 episcopal consecrations.

On 20 May 1945, Newman consecrated Bishop W. J. E. Jeffrey, so as to provide the Evangelical Catholic Communion with a new ruling bishop after the passing of Bishop Vernon Herford. The consecration ceremony took place at the Chapel of St John in Pembridge Castle. Newman had four bishops co-consecrators for the ceremony: bishops Mar Hedley of Siluria, Mar Francis of Minster, Mar John of Verulam, and Mar Adrianus of Deira (the latter was also abbot of the Order of Rielvaulx and protosynkellos of the Catholicate of the West). Before the ceremony took place, the five consecrator bishops consecrated each others under condition. At his consecration, Jeffrey took the name of Mar Johannes; he also took the titles of titular bishop of St Marylebone, Auxiliary of the Patriarchal Throne of Glastonbury, and General Moderator of the Evangelical Catholic Communion.

On 22 April 1946, Newman consecrated Bishop Richard Kenneth Hurgon in order to give the Order of Christ our Most Holy Redeemer and Heavenly King, an interdenominational Christian organisation, a ruling bishop. Hurgon was given at his consecration the name and title: Mar Begnignus, Titular Bishop of Mere, Auxiliary of the Patriarchal Throne of Glastonbury.

Between 1944 and 1946 included, Newman, stating it was in the goal of "establishing the Oecumenical Succession in the interests of Christian Unity", re-consecrated 13 bishops. The goal of those re-consecration, Newton adds, was to "confe[r] as many additional commissions as possible in other lines of Apostolic Succession". The re-consecrated bishops and their re-consecration dates are:

1. Dorian Herbert, Bishop of Caerleon, founder of the Jesuene Church (also called Free-Orthodox Catholic Church), 3 December 1944;
2. Mar Carolus, titular Bishop of Amesbury (Charles W. Keller), 29 April 1945;
3. Mar Hedley, Bishop of Siluria (Hedley C. Bartlett), 20 May 1945;
4. Mar John, Bishop of Verulam (John Syer), 20 May 1946;
5. Mar Adrianus, Bishop of Deira (G. H. Brook), 20 May 1945;
6. Mar Francis, Bishop of Minster (Frank Ernest Langhelt), 20 May 1945;
7. Mar John, Archbishop of Olivet (J. S. M. Ward), 25 August 1945;
8. Mar James, Archbishop of India and Exarch (J.C. Ryan), 25 August 1945;
9. Mar Leofric, Archbishop of Suthronia (C. L. Saul), 9 September 1945;
10. Mar David, Bishop of Repton (F. D. Bacon), 12 January 1946;
11. Mar David, Patriarch of Malaga (W. D. de Ortega Maxey), 6 June 1946;
12. Theodorus, Bishop of Mercia (S. E. P. Needham), 28 November 1946;
13. Mar Philippus, Bishop of Amersfoort (H. P. Abbinga), 28 November 1946

== Titles ==
Newman's religious titles were:

- His Sacred Beatitude Mar Georgius I, Patriarch of Glastonbury, Caertoria and Myalore
- Successor of St. Thomas
- Apostolic Pontiff of Celtica, and the Indies
- Prince-Catholicos of the West and of the United Orthodox Catholic Rite
- exarch of the Order of Antioch for Britain, Ruling Prelate of the Order of Corporate Reunion
- Grand Master of the Order of St. Thomas Acon, St. Gregory of Sarkis, and the spiritual Christian Nation
- Prelate Commander of the Order of the Crown of Thorns
- Chevalier Grand Officier of the Order of the Lion and Black Cross
- Doctor Christianismus

He was also Prince de Mardin and Duke of Saxe-Noricum.

== Works ==
- Episcopi in Ecclesia Dei and Father Brandreth : being a reply to his book Episcopi vagantes and the Anglican Church (reproduction of typewritten booklet). Glastonbury: Patriarchal Press. 1962. OCLC 771326302.
- The reluctant bishop (reproduction of typewritten pamphlet in an edition of twenty copies). Glastonbury: Patriarchal Press. 1964. OCLC 559989148. – about Basil Maurice George Stannard
- The sad case of George Forster (reproduction of typewritten booklet). Glastonbury: Patriarchal Press. 1964.
- Orthodox Catholic Review. Glastonbury. 1944–1963. OCLC 561989400. Renamed Glastonbury Review. London. OCLC 229657706.
- "The Ecclesiastical Underworld" Seraphic Press. 2017. a 98-page book, reproduction of articles first published (in serialised form) in 1935
