= Oriental Orthodox theology =

Theology of the Oriental Orthodox Churches

Oriental Orthodox theology refers to the theological studies of God, Jesus, Mary and other Christian teachings within the context of the Oriental Orthodox Churches. The Oriental Orthodox Churches adhere to the faith and tenets set out by the Nicene Creed and the councils of Nicaea, Constantinople and Ephesus. The churches use the Bible, sacred traditions, historical interpretations by Church Fathers, and the synods of the early Christian Church as its main source for theological studies.

== God ==
The Oriental Orthodox churches believe in monotheism, the belief that there is only one God, who is transcendent and far beyond human comprehension. Oriental Orthodox Christians affirm the doctrine of the Trinity: God is one essence (Greek: οὐσία, romanized: ousia) in three persons (ὑποστάσεις, hypostases)—Father, Son, and Holy Spirit, sharing one will, work, and lordship. This doctrine is considered essential to the faith, with a particular emphasis on the mystery and transcendence of God. In its liturgy and theology, Oriental Orthodoxy maintains a sense of awe and reverence for the divine, seeing God's essence as beyond full human comprehension.

=== Father ===
God the Father is called the "Fountainhead of the Trinity". This does not mean that he is superior to the other hypostases, but it is referring to the fact that the other two are defined by their relation to the Father, showing the inner mystical relations of the Holy Trinity.

=== Son ===
God the Son is the "Word" or "Logos" of God, a concept that has its foundation in the first chapter of the Gospel of John. The Son is begotten of the Father before all worlds. He is called "Light of Light" and "True God of True God". He is Jesus.

=== Holy Spirit ===
God the Holy Spirit is called the "Wind" or "Breath" of God. He eternally proceeds from the Father and is attributed with being the "Life-giver" and the "Comforter".

== Incarnation ==
Oriental Orthodoxy believes in the mystery of the Incarnation. In Oriental Orthodox theology, the Incarnation is symbolic of the Trinitarian work of God. The Oriental Orthodox believe that at the time of the Annunciation when the Angel Gabriel was sent to Mary, the Holy Spirit came to her and cleansed her of all impurities, so that the Son of God could enter her womb, and become the perfect man with the perfect soul. Because of her role in the Incarnation and the salvation of humanity, and her relationship to God the Son, in Oriental Orthodoxy, Mary is called the Mother of God or the God-bearer (Greek: Θεοτόκος, romanized: Theotokos).

=== Christology ===
The main historical theological difference between the Oriental Orthodox Churches and the other Christian denominations is in its Christology. The Oriental Orthodox Churches believe that when Christ came down to the earth, his divinity and humanity were united; and thus he has one incarnate nature that is fully divine and fully human. Oriental Orthodoxy confesses that at the time of death of Christ, his soul separated from his body, but his divinity parted from neither. Oriental Orthodoxy uses the formula from Cyril of Alexandria as proclaimed at the Council of Ephesus in AD 431, that is "One Nature of the Word of God made flesh" (Greek: μία φύσις τοῦ θεοῦ λόγου σεσαρκωμένη, romanized: mia physis tou theou logou sesarkomene). Thus, this Christological view is known as Miaphysitism.

== Sacraments ==
The seven sacraments of baptism, chrismation, the Eucharist, penance and confession, anointing of the sick, holy orders, and marriage are held in Oriental Orthodoxy. The sacraments or mysterion "can be defined as the main task of the Church in which Christ dispenses Himself to the congregation." This understanding is viewed as a combination of Augustine of Hippo and Gregory of Nyssa's teachings.

The sacrament of baptism is performed by both immersion and sprinkling; the ordained are considered "participants in the one priesthood of Christ" and "When a man is selected to become a member of the diaconate, priesthood or bishopric, he officiates sacraments not on account of a priesthood intrinsic to him but rather as one who derives his functionality from his participation in the priesthood of Christ."

Oriental Orthodox tradition accepts baptisms and ordinations from the Catholic and Eastern Orthodox churches, and considers their understanding of sacramental character "the middle path forged by Basil the Great." Similar to the Catholic, Anglican, and some Lutheran churches, the Oriental Orthodox believe that an indelible mark or imperishable character is placed upon those receiving baptism and ordination.

The Eucharist is performed according to either the Alexandrian, Armenian, West Syriac, and Malankara liturgical rites.

For the Oriental Orthodox, marriage consists of a monogamous, heterosexual couple; and same-sex marriages, the ordination of LGBTQ+ individuals, and homosexual activities have been formally condemned throughout the Oriental Orthodox Churches. In the Coptic Orthodox Church, identifying with the LGBTQ+ community "is considered a sin for which a person should repent or otherwise be expelled from the community" and in 2003, a meeting was organised for all Egyptian churches to unite against LGBTQ+ rights.
