= Charles Isaac Stevens =

American clergy

Charles Isaac Stevens (1835–1917) was allegedly the second patriarch of the Ancient British Church from 1889 to 1917 and also was primus of the Free Protestant Episcopal Church of England from 1900 to 1917.

He was born on 28 November 1835 at Clerkenwell, London, to Isaac Thomas and Anna (née Morgan) Stevens and was baptised at the Parish Church of St Luke, London, on 5 June 1836. Stevens was a Reformed Episcopal Church of England presbyter until the year 1879.

He was consecrated on 6 March 1879 by Richard Williams Morgan assisted by Frederick George Lee and John Thomas Seccombe of the Order of Corporate Reunion.

According to the Anglican Free Communion, Order of Corporate Reunion (OCR) bishops assisted Morgan at the 6 March 1879 consecration. This is disputed, however, by Henry Brandreth who (writing in 1947) considered that "it is very unlikely, however, that any of the OCR bishops performed a consecration" of Stevens.
