= Richard Williams Morgan =

Welsh Anglican priest and author (1815–1889)

Richard Williams Morgan (1815–1889), also known by his bardic name Môr Meirion, was a Welsh Anglican priest, Welsh nationalist, campaigner for the use of the Welsh language and author.

Morgan's outspoken criticism of English bishops in Wales who could not speak Welsh led him into conflict with the authorities of the Church of England. He supported the Celtic revival movement, and in 1858 helped organise an eisteddfod at Llangollen. In books on the history of the Welsh and the origins of Christianity in Wales, he traced the ancestry of the Welsh people back to Japheth, son of Noah, and in his St. Paul in Britain, claimed that the apostle Paul had converted the people of Britain to Christianity; and thus, the British Church was as old as the Church of Rome, and never owed allegiance to the Pope.

In the 1870s, Morgan became involved in the establishment of a new church, the "British Church", later to be known as the "Ancient British Church" and perhaps envisaged as the restoration of the original church allegedly set up in Britain by Paul of Tarsus and other Christian missionaries. Morgan was consecrated as hierarch or bishop of Caerleon-upon-Usk and possibly as Patriarch of this new church.

== Life ==
=== Early life ===
Richard Williams Morgan was born in 1815 in Llanfor, near Bala, then in Merionethshire, now Gwynedd, the son of the Rev. Richard Morgan and his wife Anna Margaretta Williams. (Note: The Dictionary of Welsh Biography ("Morgan, Richard Williams") says he was born in Llangynfelyn, Cardiganshire. This information was apparently derived from Daniel Williams Memoirs and Sketches of One Hundred-and-Eleven Eminent Men... (1874), and according to Thomann it "cannot be verified" (Thomann 4).) He was a nephew of John Williams, later Archdeacon of Cardigan. Morgan was educated at Saint David's College in Lampeter.

=== Clergyman ===
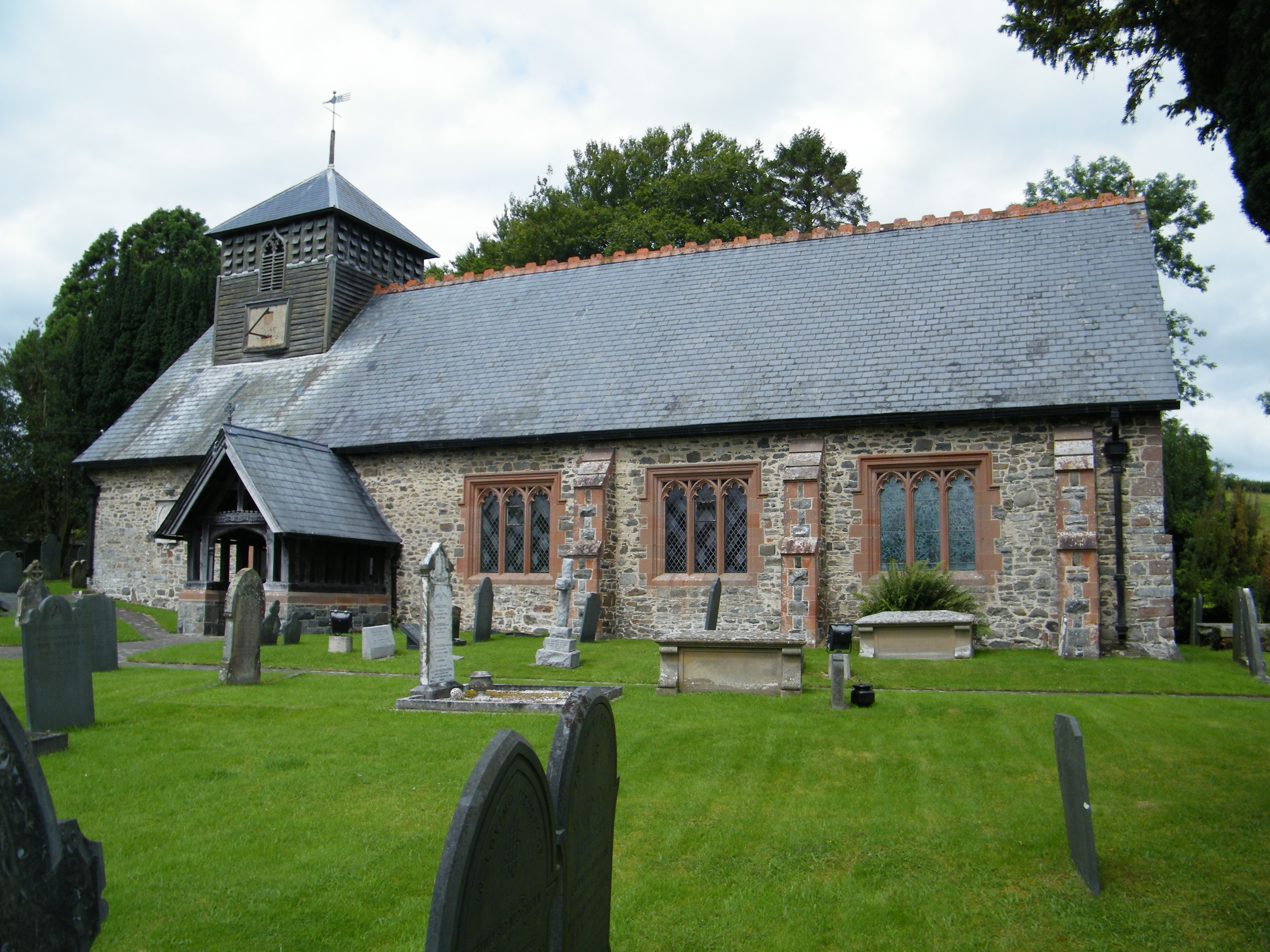
Tregynon church in 2009, by Ray Durrant.

Morgan was ordained deacon in 1841 and priest in 1842, and was appointed as curate at Mochdre and perpetual curate at nearby Tregynon, both of them small villages in Montgomeryshire (now Powys) in north Wales. He remained curate in Mochdre only until 1852, but retained his position in Tregynon until 1862.

In 1852 Morgan came into conflict with the bishop, Thomas Vowler Short, Bishop of St Asaph, within whose diocese Tregynon lay. Morgan had dismissed his maidservant, Elizabeth Williams, when she became pregnant; she gave birth to an illegitimate child, and, before dying of typhus, she claimed that Morgan was the father. Not surprisingly, Short took this up as a disciplinary matter, and although he finally accepted that Morgan was not the father of Elizabeth's child, the enmity between the two men was to grow worse. In 1854 Morgan was accused of mismanaging his parish finances, and Bishop Short sequestrated Morgan's living; although Morgan remained in position as perpetual curate of Tregynon, all the income passed to his junior, the curate Augustus Field.

=== Welsh nationalist ===
By the mid-1850s, Morgan had become an outspoken Welsh nationalist, campaigning for the use of the Welsh language in schools and in churches, and, as Thomann says, "became notorious for his attacks on the shortcomings of the Established Church in Wales". In particular, he criticised English bishops in Wales who could not speak Welsh, including his own bishop, Thomas Short. In 1855 Morgan published a book on The Church and its Episcopal Corruptions in Wales, and wrote to the Archbishop of Canterbury, John Bird Sumner, asking that these bishops be removed from their posts (and then published the correspondence); in 1857 he followed this with a similar letter to the Prime Minister, Lord Palmerston. His notorious attitude towards the bishops, and the public and aggressive way he expressed his feelings, led to scandal in November 1857, when he was staying with friends in Rhosymedre, Ruabon, in north-east Wales. After giving a public speech on the failings of the Church in Wales, he attended a communion service at the local parish church, where, in front of the whole congregation, the officiating curate refused to administer the cup to Morgan, on the grounds that he was not "in charity with all his neighbours" as required by the Church of England's catechism. In spite of several letters to the bishop in whose diocese Rhosymedre church lay written in support of Morgan by the incumbent and the churchwardens, the bishop (it was, unfortunately, Morgan's enemy Bishop Short of St Asaph) refused to intervene on his behalf. (Note: Thomann reprints Morgan's account of this event and the subsequent correspondence with Bishop Short.) Morgan did not formally resign from his perpetual curacy in Tregynon until 1862, but after 1858 he never held another ecclesiastical position in Wales, and lived mostly in England.

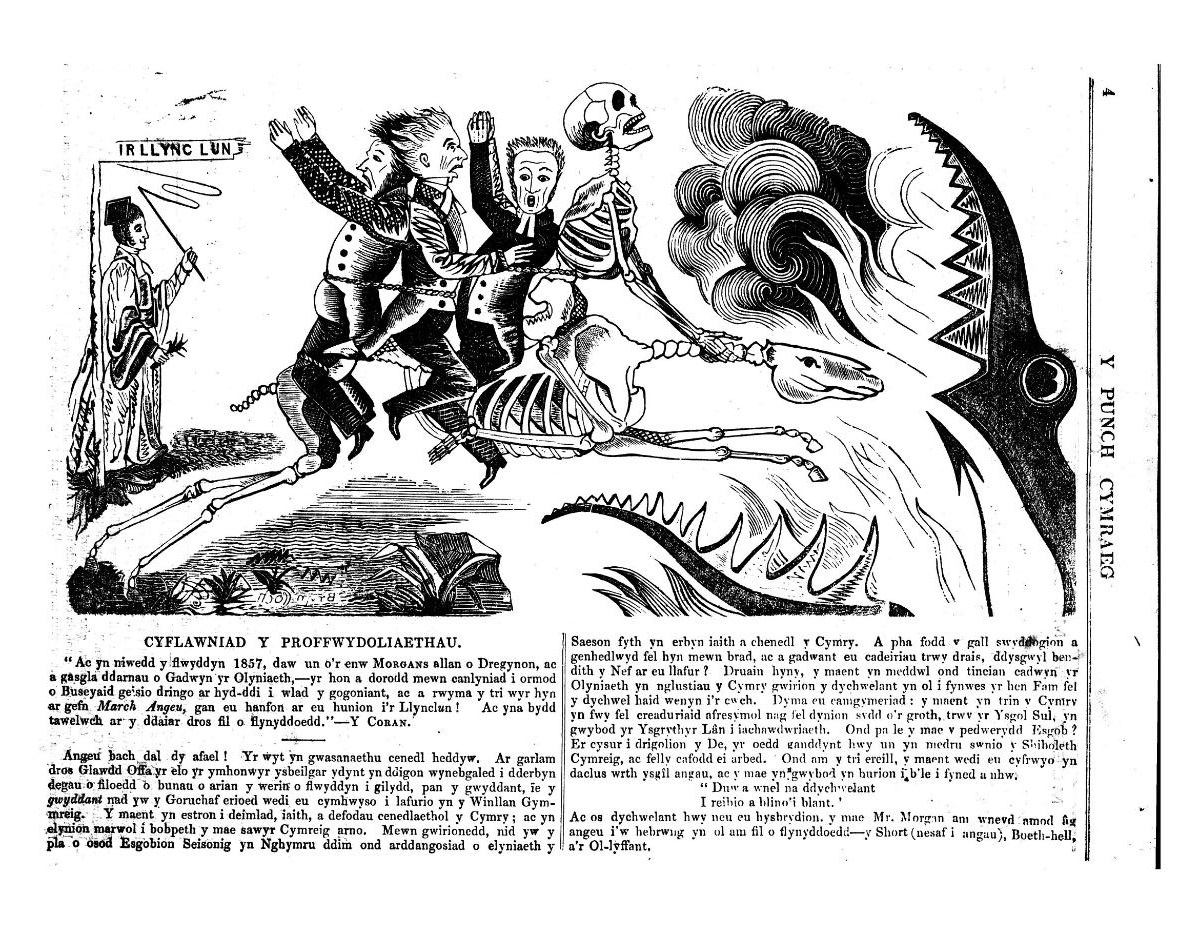
Cartoon by Ellis Owen Ellis showing Morgan driving English bishops out of Wales, in Y Punch Cymraeg, 3 April 1858 (from the National Library of Wales).

In April 1858 the Welsh-language (and strongly Welsh nationalist) satirical magazine Y Punch Cymraeg published a cartoon supporting Morgan's campaign against the English bishops. Drawn by Ellis Owen Ellis, it depicted Morgan himself, brandishing a whip and driving a skeletal horse and rider out of Wales and into the jaws of Hell. Three clerical figures were bound to the back of the horse; they were identified in the accompanying Welsh text as Bishop Short, Bishop Bethell of Bangor and Bishop Ollivant of Llandaff. The Welsh text described them thus: "they have been carefully saddled as pillions of Death, who knows where to take them".

At this time, Morgan was also involved in the Celtic Revival movement, along with other Welsh clergymen like his cousin John Williams, the bard Ab Ithel. Morgan himself adopted the bardic name Môr Meirion ("Sea of Merioneth", with reference to his own name and his birthplace). In 1858, he joined Ab Ithel and other like-minded clergy to organise an eisteddfod at Llangollen, Denbighshire – although some of his colleagues felt that his involvement, while he continued his campaigns against the English bishops, might jeopardise the plans for the meeting. The focus of the gathering was a gorsedd, a ceremonial meeting of bards, following rituals claimed to be based on ancient Celtic practice, but actually invented by Edward Williams, commonly known as Iolo Morganwg, in the late 18th century. One Welsh newspaper editor, Isaac Foulkes, commented at the time "every oddbod in Wales took himself off there, and no doubt felt quite at home in the company". A more recent historian noted "members of the public [...] were to witness the most derisory scenes on an eisteddfod platform. Ab Ithel and his friends appeared in strange 'druidical' costumes, while Myfyr Morgannwyg wore an egg on a string round his neck". Môr Meirion himself declaimed the opening "Gorsedd Prayer" and later in an oration (as a contemporary commented) "launched his energetic but somewhat too unqualified Cymricism".

After 1858 Morgan served as a curate for short periods in a number of English parishes, but in the 1860s he lived most of the time in London, concentrating on pseudohistorical writing. He had already in 1857 published The British Kymry, an extensive account of the history of Wales and the Welsh people, whose origin he traced back to Japheth, one of the sons of Noah and according to tradition the ancestor of the peoples of Europe. In 1861 came St. Paul in Britain, in which he proposed that Paul of Tarsus had evangelised and made converts in Britain, and, as Thomann says, "[argued] that the British Church was as old and venerable as the Roman and equally of apostolic origin". Morgan returned to the subject of the Japhetic origin of the Welsh in 1863, in his Vindication of the Mosaic Ethnology of Europe, in which he reaffirmed the accuracy of the Biblical story of the Flood, and the historical descent of the races of mankind from the sons of Noah.

=== Ancient British Church ===
In 1866 Jules Ferrette, also known as "Mar Julius", arrived in England with papers showing that he had been consecrated as Bishop of Iona by the Oriental Orthodox Bishop of Homs in Syria, Mar Bedros, with powers to ordain other bishops in Britain. At some point Ferrette met Morgan, and, suggests Anson, "found a kindred spirit in this erratic, unstable, hot-headed Welsh clergyman". In about 1874, when Morgan was serving as curate in Marholm, near Peterborough, Ferrette allegedly consecrated him as "Pelagius I", Bishop or Hierarch of Caerleon-upon-Usk and (the details are disputed) Patriarch of a new "British Church" – later to be known as the "Ancient British Church".

Brandreth reports a later claim that Morgan was "obsessed with the vision of a British Church that should restore the doctrine and discipline of the days before St Augustine". In 1878 Morgan, as "Pelagius", published an Altar Service of the British Church, in the preface of which he repeated his conviction that "The British Church was founded by the Apostles and Apostolic Missions A.D. 49 – four centuries before the Foreign Roman Papal Church was founded in Kent by Pope Gregory and St. Augustine". There seem to be no records of the early activities of Morgan's British Church, if any. Pearson comments on similar church foundations: "These churches were made up predominantly of bishops, with a few priests and deacons and hardly any laity". However, in 1879 Morgan consecrated Charles Isaac Stevens, a former Reformed Episcopal Church presbyter, as his "perpetual coadjutor with the right of succession". Several later churches, in England and abroad, were to claim apostolic succession through Stevens, Morgan and Ferrette.

=== Death ===
In spite of his involvement with the Ancient British Church, Morgan served as curate twice more in English parishes, in Stapleton, Shropshire in 1882–83, and in Offord D'Arcy, Huntingdonshire in 1886–88; in 1888 he retired and moved to Broadstairs in Kent, but died on 22 August 1889 in Pevensey, Sussex.

== Writings ==
Richard Williams Morgan was a prolific author; Thomann listed over 25 publications by him, written between 1845 and 1878. Since Morgan published not only under his own name but as "R.W.M.", "Môr Meirion", and "Pelagius", and wrote short articles for obscure magazines and newspapers, Thomann may not have identified all of his publications. He wrote not only about church matters and Welsh history, but fiction, poetry, a verse play, and a guide-book to North Wales. He even used his poetic skills to satirise Bishop Short in verse. However, even contemporary critics in Wales questioned the reliability of his historical writings. An article published in the Cambrian Journal in 1863 described him as "a man of genius, ability and learning, the energetic champion of all Cymric interests, and the uncompromising scourge of all ecclesiastical abusers. If only he would chasten his imagination, and moderate his patriotic impulses, in dealing with Welsh history, he would be also entitled to unqualified praise as one of the most eloquent and vigorous writers of the day".

More recent writers have been even more critical. According to Peter Anson, Morgan was "a tireless but uncritical research worker, ready to believe anything that took his fancy and indifferent to the lack of documentary evidence". Yet Morgan did draw on documentary sources. However, these included, for example, the History of the Kings of Britain, the pseudohistory of the origins and early history of Britain by the 12th-century writer Geoffrey of Monmouth, and supposed ancient Welsh texts from the collections of the Welsh antiquarian Iolo Morganwg (Edward Williams, 1747–1826) that were later proved to be forgeries. Morgan accepted all these as factual records of early British and Welsh history and culture – and then interpreted them and elaborated on them in the light of his strongly pro-Welsh feelings and his enthusiasm for all things Welsh.

Morgan seems to have written little after the appearance of his verse play The Duke's Daughter in 1867, although a second edition of his St. Paul in Britain appeared in 1880.

=== The British Kymry ===
Several of his publications, however, did have some lasting influence. In 1857 Morgan published The British Kymry, or Britons of Cambria, a comprehensive history of the Welsh people from the time of the Biblical Flood to the 19th century. This was, he claimed in his preface, "the version of these transactions, of British history in general" that the Welsh themselves had preserved.

The chronological span of the book is demonstrated in a fold-out chart explaining the lineal descent of the crown of Britain from the first legendary ruler of Britain, Brutus of Troy, to Queen Victoria. As this suggests, the early part of Morgan's book is a reworking of Geoffrey of Monmouth's account of Brutus and his legendary successors in his History of the Kings of Britain, written in the early 12th century, and long dismissed as largely fictional by modern historians. Morgan accepted it as a factual account, and elaborated on it, drawing on Welsh medieval texts and legends, as well as on the forgeries of Iolo Morganwg. Although Morgan is an extreme example in his reliance on such untrustworthy sources and the extent of his elaborations on them, these sources were also drawn on by some of his Welsh contemporaries, such as his cousin John Williams (Ab Ithel), who published The Barddas of Iolo Morganwg in 1862.

Morgan devotes several pages to an account of "the Druidic religion of Britain". He claims that Joseph of Arimathea, who according to medieval legends had first brought Christianity to Britain, had been invited by "some eminent Druids", and that later the apostle Paul of Tarsus had visited Britain and made many converts – subjects he was later to enlarge on in his book St. Paul in Britain. He claimed the ancient British church had been established by "Christo-Druidic bards"; that their church and religion was untainted, unlike the Roman Catholic Church, and that their politics were pure, unlike those of the Saxons.

A historian recently dismissed The British Kymry as a "benighted and fanciful treatise". However, in 1933 a reprint of the book appeared, under a new title History of Britain: From the Flood to A.D. 700. This comprised little more than the first half of Morgan's book, complete with his original introduction dated 1857, but with no indication of the text's context or its first publication.

=== St. Paul in Britain ===
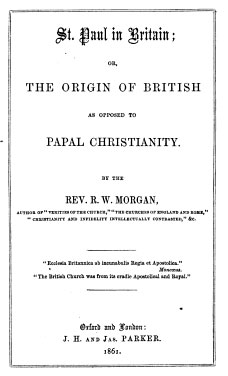
Title page of Morgan's St. Paul in Britain, 1861.

In 1861 Morgan returned to the subject of the Christianisation of Britain in St. Paul in Britain: or, the origin of British as opposed to papal Christianity. The case that the Apostle Paul had visited Britain and converted the Britons to Christianity had been argued earlier by Thomas Burgess (1756–1837), Bishop of St Davids from 1803 to 1825, in a series of pamphlets and sermons with titles like Christ, and not Saint Peter, the Rock of the Christian Church; and Saint Paul, the Founder of the Church in Britain and The Protestant Catechism, in which it is clearly proved, that the Ancient British Church existed several centuries before Popery had any footing in Great Britain. The subject was also a matter of great interest to Morgan's cousin John Williams, who in 1844 published The Ecclesiastical Antiquities of the Cymry; or the Ancient British Church; its History, Doctrine, and Rites.

In St. Paul in Britain, Morgan developed Burgess's arguments, and summarised his own conclusions: "Christianity was first introduced into Britain by Joseph of Arimathæa, A.D. 36–39; followed by Simon Zelotes, the apostle; then by Aristobulus, the first bishop of the Britons; then by St. Paul". Morgan claimed that Paul had not only consecrated Aristobulus as the first bishop and sent him to Britain, but then himself visited Britain and converted the British royal family.

Thus, the ancient church in Britain was, within a few years, as old as the first church established in Jerusalem. Its teachings came directly "from the lips of the first disciples themselves of Christ" (as Morgan said in his preface). It was independent of the Church of Rome, and did not recognise the authority of the Pope, only introduced to Britain by the mission of Augustine of Canterbury in the sixth century.

Morgan also emphasised his belief in the role of the British Druids in the conversion of the country to Christianity. He claimed that their ancient faith was close to Christianity, and, as Ronald Hutton says, "In his view, Druids had led the British in an uncompromising opposition to Roman paganism, joyously received the Christian faith, and had been persecuted by the Romans alongside Christians as a result". In the 20th century Morgan's views on the relationship between the Druids and early Christianity in Britain seem to have influenced Gerald Gardner, one of the founders of modern Witchcraft or Wicca. He owned a copy of St. Paul in Britain, and according to Pearson "much of Gardner’s history of Christianity in Britain [in his book The Meaning of Witchcraft (1959)] comes straight from the pages of Morgan's St. Paul in Britain". Pearson notes that Gardner had concluded that witches were well-disposed to early Celtic Christianity, represented by the Druids who had become Christians, but disliked the invading Saxons and their type of Christianity, which derived from Rome.

Morgan's book went through nine reprintings between 1861 and 1984. Joanna Pearson notes that in the 20th century the book was adopted by the British Israelite Society, and several editions of it were issued by their own publishing house, the Covenant Publishing Company, between 1925 and 1948.

=== London Stone ===
In the 1850s Morgan spent much of his time in London, and it was presumably at this time he first took an interest in London Stone, the mysterious monolith that stood in Cannon Street in the centre of the City of London and was already known by the end of the 11th century as "lundene stane". There had long been speculation about its origin and function, and Morgan incorporated it into his extraordinary vision of the origins and history of the Welsh people. His starting point was Geoffrey of Monmouth's 12th-century History of the Kings of Britain, which attributed the original settlement of Britain to a party of Trojan refugees led by Brutus of Troy, who gave his name to the land of Britain and the British people. According to Geoffrey, Brutus had founded his capital city, which he called "Troia Nova" ("New Troy"), later "Trinovantum", on the site of London. In 1857 in his The British Kymry Morgan added novel details to this bare account. He claimed that London Stone was once in Troy itself. It was the stone plinth on which had stood the Palladium, the statue of the goddess Pallas Athene upon which, according to Greek legend, the safety of the city of Troy depended. Brutus had brought it to Britain, and when he founded New Troy, he had set the Stone up there, in a temple dedicated to the goddess Diana. "On it", according to Morgan, "the British Kings were sworn to observe the Usages of Britain". Morgan added that there was an ancient belief that as long as London Stone survived, London "would continue to increase in wealth and power"; if London Stone were lost or destroyed, the city "would decrease and finally disappear". John Clark concluded, however: "there is no trace of [these traditions] in any independent source".

In 1862 Morgan returned to the subject in a brief contribution to the scholarly journal Notes and Queries, published under his bardic name "Môr Meirion". In it he claimed that London Stone was made of porphyry, and that this was the same material as the Altar Stone at Stonehenge. He repeated his assertions about its origin and historic significance. Moreover, he added that there was an ancient Welsh saying that referred to it: "Tra maen Prydain, Tra lled Llyndain" ("As long as the Stone of Prydain [exists], so long will London expand/spread"). He provided a supposed English equivalent: "So long as the Stone of Brutus is safe, so long will London flourish". Clark was unable to identify the source of these "traditional sayings", and surmised they were Morgan's own invention.

Morgan's ideas about London Stone were largely ignored at the time. Then in 1888 the popular fortnightly magazine Chambers's Journal published a short article about London Stone. This included ideas clearly derived from Morgan's Notes and Queries article (without crediting it), and cited "an old saying to the effect, that 'so long as the stone of Brutus is safe, so long shall London flourish'". Taken up by later more influential writers like the folklorist Lewis Spence the idea that London Stone was "the Stone of Brutus" and that dire results would result from destroying or even moving it became widely known. The "traditional saying" about "the Stone of Brutus" and the role of London Stone as London's own Palladium is mentioned in almost every later description of London Stone.

== Publications by Morgan ==
This list of Morgan's more significant publications is derived from Thomann's comprehensive listing.

- 1848, Maynooth and St. Asaph, or, the Religious Policy of the Conservative Cabinet Considered
- 1849, Notes on Various Distinctive Verities of the Church
- 1851, Ida de Galis: a Tragedy of Powys Castle
- 1851, Vindication of the Church of England: in Reply to Viscount Fielding
- 1853, Raymonde de Monthault, The Lord Marcher
- 1854, Christianity and Modern Infidelity (reprinted New York, 1859)
- 1855, The Church and its Episcopal Corruptions in Wales
- 1855, Correspondence and Statement of Facts Connected with the Case of the Rev. R. W. Morgan
- 1855, Scheme for the Reconstruction of the Church Episcopate and its Patronage to Wales
- 1856, North Wales or Venedotia
- 1857, The British Kymry or Britons of Cambria (reprinted New York, 1860; translated into Welsh by Thomas Hughes and edited by the Rev. John Williams (Ab Ithel) as Hanes yr Hen Gymry, eu Defodau a’u Sefydliadau, 1858)
- 1858, Amddiffyniad yr iaith Gymraeg (= A Defence of the Welsh Language)
- 1861, St. Paul in Britain or the Origin of the British as Opposed to Papal Christianity (2nd ed. 1880)
- 1863, Vindication of the Mosaic Ethnology of Europe. Primitive or Japhetic Europe: Its Race, Language and Topography
- 1867, The Duke's Daughter, a Classical Tragedy

Writing as H. H. Pelagius:

- 1878, Altar Service of the British Church: Order of the Celebration of the Sacrifice of the Altar, or Holy Communion
