= Ancient British Church =

British religious movement

The Ancient British Church was a British religious movement supposedly founded in the 19th century by Jules Ferrette (Mar Julius) and Richard Williams Morgan (Mar Pelagius). The Ancient British Church ceased to exist in 1944.

== Foundation ==
Jules Ferrette was ordained a Roman Catholic priest in 1855. The next year, he left the Roman Catholic Church and became a Presbyterian minister and missionary. He worked for the Irish Presbyterian Mission in Damascus from 1858 to 1865, and assisted Frederick Hamilton-Temple-Blackwood's Mission to the poor Christians of Mount Lebanon from 1860 to 1862. In 1866, he came back from Damascus to England, and claimed he had been ordained bishop "Mar Julius, Bishop of Iona" by a bishop of the Syrian Jacobite Church, Mar Bedros of Emesa. No original proof of Ferrette's episcopal ordination through the Syriac Orthodox Church exists, despite Ferrette showing a printed document "which he claimed was a translation [in English] of his certificate of consecration, dated 22 June 1866 (Old Style)." Henry R.T. Brandreth noted the translation was signed by the British consul at Damascus as an official translation.

Allegedly, in Oxfordshire some time after 1858, Richard Williams Morgan, an Anglican priest, was conditionally "baptised, confirmed, ordained and consecrated" as patriarch of the Ancient British Church by Ferrette, and given by him the full title Mar Pelagius I, Hierarch of Caerleon-on-Usk. Jules Ferrette died in 1903.

== Continuation ==
The church continued after Morgan's death. Pearson describes the organisation as having "always remained rather shadowy, rather an idea than a community". Supposedly, Morgan consecrated a successor, Charles Isaac Stevens, in 1879. Supposedly, Stevens consecrated around 1890 a successor in the person of Leon Chechemian, an alleged Armenian vardapet, who allegedly at this consecration was given the religious name Mar Leon.

== Dissolution ==
By a declaration dated 23 March 1944, the Ancient British Church, the British Orthodox Catholic Church, and the Old Catholic Orthodox Church merged; the official name of the new church was: "The Western Orthodox Catholic Church". This church was made the Catholicate of the West by its Patriarch Abdullah III (William Bernard Crow). No church of the East gave its recognition to the Catholicate.

The first Catholicos of the West, head of the Catholicate of the West, was Hugh George de Willmott Newman. He was consecrated as this status by Abdullah III on 10 April 1944 under the name and title: Mar Georgius, Archbishop and Metropolitan of the Holy Metropolis of Glastonbury, the Occidental Jerusalem, and Catholicos of the West. Thereafter, Mar Jacobus II stepped down from his office of fifth Patriarch of the Ancient British Church, passing his rank of Patriarch to Willmott Newman; thus Willmott Newman was both Catholicos of the West and the sixth Patriarch of the Ancient British Church. Mar Jacobus II died in 1947.

== Ideology ==
Morgan and Ferrette planned the movement as an attempt to restore a form of Christianity in Britain that they called Neo-Celtic Christianity. Morgan claimed that Christianity in Britain existed in a syncretistic, druidic form prior to the entry of Augustine of Canterbury.

The publications of John Williams (Ab Ithel), Iolo Morganwg, Morgan, and Ferrette influenced the movement.

== See also ==
- Celtic Revival
