= Independent sacramental movement =

Christian movement

The independent sacramental movement (ISM) is a loose collection of individuals and Christian denominations that are not part of the historic sacramental Christian denominations embodying catholicity (such as the Catholic Church, Eastern Orthodox Church, the Scandinavian Lutheran churches and Anglican churches) and yet continue to practice the historic sacramental rites independently.

The term was used in 2005 by John Plummer, in The Many Paths of the Independent Sacramental Movement, and was used earlier, in 2002, by Richard Smoley in his Inner Christianity.

== Terminology ==
The movement's name is an expansion of an earlier term: the Independent Orthodox, Catholic, and Anglican Movement, which was used extensively during many years when many of these groups cooperated, although they were not in formal communion with one another. The majority of these groups' holy orders and sequences of apostolic succession are derived through mutually-common sources, especially Arnold Harris Mathew, Aftimios Ofiesh, Carlos Duarte Costa, and Joseph René Vilatte. It remains difficult to define the ISM as an entity and to distinguish it from the closely related Independent Catholic movement; the two terms are sometimes used interchangeably, seemingly to refer to the same reality.

== Characteristics ==
Many denominations within the movement originated from schisms with the historic sacramental Christian denominations, and they claim to have preserved the historic episcopate or apostolic succession, though such claims are frequently disputed or rejected outright by the historic churches of Rome, Constantinople, the Union of Utrecht of the Old Catholic Churches, and the Church of England.

Groups within the independent sacramental movement are alternatively known as Independent Catholic, Old Catholic (though not to be confused with the Union of Utrecht of Old Catholic Churches), Liberal Catholic, Autocephalous Orthodox, Free Sacramental, or, sometimes pejoratively, as micro-churches, parallel churches, or episcopi vagantes in the case of their bishops.

== See also ==
- Continuing Anglican movement
- Continuing church
- True Orthodox church
