= Roberto Garrido Padin =

Roberto Garrido Padin (born 1945 in Brazil) is a bishop of the Independent Catholic Church, based at the church of Santa Barbara in Salvador de Bahia, Northern Brazil.

Roberto Garrido Padin was born into a Spanish family. He was ordained a priest in 1972 by Bishop Luigi Mascolo of the Brazilian Catholic Apostolic Church, and served as a parish priest and as secretary to the bishop. He was consecrated a bishop by Manoel Ceia Laranjeira on 2 May 1989 at Salvador de Bahia. Bishop Manoel Ceia Laranjeira had been consecrated bishop in 1951 by Bishop Salomão Barbosa Ferraz of the Free Catholic Church of Brazil. Bishop Roberto Garrido Padin currently serves as bishop of the Diocese of Salvador de Bahia of the Independent Catholic Apostolic Church of Brazil.

Garrido Padin reached the attention of the world media in 2002 as having been the Principal Consecrator, in 1998, of the Argentine bishop Rómulo Antonio Braschi of the Catholic Apostolic Charismatic Church of Jesus the King, who controversially attempted to "ordain" the group of women known as the Danube Seven into the Roman Catholic priesthood.

== Sources ==
- http://www.igrejacatolicaindependente.com.br
- http://www.independentmovement.us/index.php?title=Historical_Jurisdictions
- Jarvis, Edward (2018). God, Land & Freedom: the true story of ICAB. Apocryphile Press. ISBN 9781947826908.
