= Instituto María Rosa Mystica, Sacerdotes Carismáticos Misioneros =

The Instituto María Rosa Mystica, Sacerdotes Misioneros Carismáticos (Institute of Mary Mystical Rose – Charismatic Missionary Priests) is a small independent Catholic association under the protection of the independent Catholic Brazilian Catholic Apostolic Church. Founded in 2004 by Bishop Gustavo Adrian Gabucci, it consists of independent Catholic priests and laypeople in Buenos Aires, Argentina.

== History ==
Gabucci was born in Buenos Aires in 1965. He completed his ministerial and priestly formation at the Roman Catholic Major Seminary at La Plata (capital city of Buenos Aires Province), gaining a degree in philosophy from the Universidad Católica Argentina (Argentine Catholic University) in addition to theological studies. He received the Minor Orders from Bishop (later Cardinal) Quarracino. Still, He left the seminary, disillusioned with the Roman Church's stance on personal freedom and lifestyle choice, shortly before his Diaconal ordination.

In 1991 he was ordained into the Brazilian Order of San Andres (St Andrew), which was founded as a non-denominational Christian Catholic congregation in 1928 by Reverend Salomao Barbosa Ferraz.

When the Order of San Andres closed its Argentine branch in the mid-1990s and decided to pursue the possibility of entering into full communion with the Vatican, Father Gabucci joined the independent Iglesia Católica Apostólica Argentina (Argentine Catholic Apostolic Church) founded in 1970, which wasn't Roman Catholic but in communion with the Igreja Católica Apostólica Brasileira – the breakaway Brazilian Catholic Apostolic Church. The Argentine Catholic Apostolic Church (Iglesia Católica Apostólica Argentina) was under the leadership of Bishop Jose Eugenio Tenca Rusconi, who consecrated Father Gabucci as his auxiliary bishop in 2000.

The following year Tenca Rusconi radically restructured the Argentine Catholic Apostolic Church, encouraging his bishops to found autonomous congregations, united in a broad federation of Christian Catholic religious associations. In response to this Bishop Gabucci founded the Institute of Mary Mystic Rose – Charismatic Missionary Priests, which has materialized as an independent missionary congregation, maintaining only minimal links with the other young congregations of the ICAA. In 2005 the congregation secured the full legal recognition and patronage of the Brazilian Catholic Apostolic Church – under the leadership of Dom Luis Fernando Castillo Mendez – and now depends directly on the Brazilian Church's Patriarchate in Brasília, while maintaining its practical autonomy even in disciplinary matters.

== Theology ==
The institute considers itself to be fully Christian and Catholic, maintaining the seven Catholic Sacraments and the apostolic succession of its clergy members in an unbroken line to the Apostles mainly through the former Roman Catholic Bishop Carlos Duarte Costa.

Liturgies are celebrated according to either a slightly revised Roman Rite, or a Spanish version of the Brazilian Church's rite, itself a version of the pre-Vatican II Roman rite which was one of Duarte Costa's bones of contention with the Vatican in 1945 and was perceived as a necessity to celebrate Mass in the vernacular, and while facing the worshipers).

The school is Marian or associated with Mary, as implied by its name. And spiritually connects with her as an example and source of motivation. It does not only pursue this in the cult of Mary Mystical Rose (a popular devotion tracing its roots to Italy and, further back, Germany), but also in the proposed devotion to Mary Mother of Diversity, with all the colors of the rainbow being added to the traditionally Marian celeste, representing the inclusive approach to people of all cultures, lifestyles, and social classes. The institute has embraced elements of the Charismatic Movement, chiefly in the liturgical and prayer style, and in those areas that do not clash with the congregation's essentially traditional catholic theological outlook. The institute could be described as liberal catholic, with an enthusiastic attitude to ecumenism and concelebration, and support of the ordination of women, including to the episcopate (although there are no female clergy within the institute at present).

== Work and Mission ==
The Institute does not at present possess any buildings or community houses. At the time of its foundation, representatives of the institute were formally received by the Roman Catholic Cardinal Archbishop of Buenos Aires Jorge Mario Bergoglio, but as the institute is not canonically recognised by the Vatican, its clergy cannot operate in any of Argentina's thousands of churches. The celebration of the sacraments and liturgical acts takes place in a variety of small oratories, privately erected chapels, homes and public places, especially in the poorer areas of the city. The homely, direct style of the institute's Charismatic Missionary Priests has won them the affection of some of Buenos Aires' poorest inhabitants, including members of the semi–legal immigrant communities from poorer parts of Latin America.

While living and working among the poor, offering spiritual and emotional support, especially to those Christians who feel alienated from the traditional churches, the institute's members are dedicated to the ongoing professional and pastoral formation, and to the modest ecumenical movement present in the overwhelmingly conservative Roman Catholic–dominated republic. The Institute of Mary Mystic Rose looks towards greater cooperation with the mainstream denominations wherever possible, both in Argentina and abroad, and to discovering new ways to spread the Gospel by way of the inclusive and ecumenical catholic faith.
