= Manoel Ceia Laranjeira =

Brazilian Bishop of the Independent Catholicism movement

Dom Manoel Ceia Laranjeira
- Bishop, Patriarch of Free Catholic Church
- Church: Free Catholic Church; Brazilian Catholic Apostolic Church
- In office: 1951 - 1994
- Predecessor: Salomão Barbosa Ferraz
- Successor: Lapercio Eudes Moreira

Orders
- Ordination: 1947 by Carlos Duarte Costa
- Consecration: 29 June 1951 by Carlos Duarte Costa
- Rank: Bishop

Personal details
- Born: 1903 Brazil
- Died: 1994 (aged 90-91) Brazil
- Denomination: Independent Catholicism

Manoel Ceia Laranjeira (1903–1994) was a Brazilian Bishop of the Independent Catholicism movement, particularly the Brazilian Catholic Apostolic Church.

== Biography ==
Laranjeira was in Brazil at an unknown date in 1903. He was ordained a priest and consecrated a Roman Catholic bishop, where he was still active until the early 1990s.

Manoel Ceia Laranjeira converted to the Brazilian Catholic Apostolic Church and was ordained a priest by excommunicated Roman Catholic Bishop Carlos Duarte Costa in 1947. He was consecrated Bishop by Salomão Barbosa Ferraz (who become Roman Catholic Bishop later) in 1951; after Salomão Barbosa Ferraz's submission to the Vatican, Laranjeira led the Brazilian Free Catholic Church as Ferraz's successor and renamed the movement the Independent Catholic Apostolic Church of Brazil, which was officially registered on August 25, 1966.

Laranjeira died at an unknown date in 1994 from an unknown cause. He was succeeded by Dom Lapercio Eudes Moreira and in turn by the current head of the movement, Dom Paulo Ferreira Da Silva as Patriarch and Dom Roberto Garrido Padin as Diocesan Bishop of Salvador de Bahia.
