= Argentine Catholic Apostolic Church =

Independent Catholic Christian church

- Spanish: Iglesia Católica Apostólica Argentina
- Abbreviation: ICAA
- Classification: Western Christian
- Orientation: Independent Catholic
- Polity: Episcopal
- Moderator: Dante Luis Bergonzi Moreno
- Associations: Worldwide Communion of Catholic Apostolic Churches
- Region: Argentina
- Founder: Leonardo Morizio Domínguez
- Origin: 1971; Buenos Aires, Argentina
- Branched from: Brazilian Catholic Apostolic Church

The Argentine Catholic Apostolic Church (Spanish: Iglesia Católica Apostólica Argentina, ICAA), also known as the Argentine National Church, is an Independent Catholic Christian church derived from the Brazilian Catholic Apostolic Church (ICAB). The ICAA was founded in 1971 in Buenos Aires by Leonardo Morizio Dominguez, with a clear right-wing political orientation and direct support from the ICAB.

== History ==
"Like previous branches of ICAB, ICAA benefited from a political ‘moment’ characterized by social unrest, nationalism, right-wing extremism and anticlericalism. ICAA fitted in with the schemes of an influential government ‘advisor’ called José López Rega. He was nicknamed El Brujo–the Sorcerer or the Witchdoctor–for his love of the occult and the esoteric. ICAA became one of the Witchdoctor’s pet projects." Morizio Dominguez was consecrated as archbishop and primate in 1972 by Luigi Mascolo, then the head ICAB bishop. The ICAA styled itself as a national church and was briefly registered in the Registro Nacional de Cultos (Spanish for National Register of Religions) (1978-1981).

=== Pedro Ruiz Badanelli ===
In 1973 Pedro Ruiz Badanelli (1899–1985) was consecrated as an ICAA bishop by Morizio Dominguez. Badanelli was a notable former priest of the Roman Catholic Archdiocese of Santa Fe, Argentina, an academic canon lawyer, founder of university departments, and dissident Catholic supporter and friend of President Juan Perón. In 1958, Badanelli wrote, in his book Perón, La Iglesia y un Cura, that he rejected the idea of an Argentine state religion similar to the Church of England, and denied the rumour that in 1960 ICAB Bishop Carlos Duarte Costa clandestinely consecrated him in Buenos Aires. Nevertheless Badanelli later adhered to the ICAA.

=== After the dictatorship ===
The Argentine Catholic Apostolic Church began as a project of apparent religious support for right-wing extremism, but with the end of the National Reorganization Process (the last military dictatorship) in 1983, the ICAA was deregistered from the National Register of Religions. By this time Morizio Dominguez had consecrated José Eugenio Tenca Rusconi (c. 1930–2003), a former Roman Catholic priest, as a bishop, who in turn later consecrated many of the current ICAA bishops. In 1992 Tenca Rusconi ordained Dante Luis Bergonzi Moreno (1965–) to the priesthood and consecrated him as a bishop three years later. Bergonzi Moreno became the bishop–primate of ICAA. Tenca Rusconi also consecrated Ramón Frías, Eduardo Lencina, Gustavo Gabucci, and a Monsignor Arnedo as bishops. Bergonzi Moreno, in turn, has consecrated Carlos Walter Vich Pizarro and Carlos Adrian Guedes Dominguez as bishops.

=== Splits and divisions ===
"Almost as long as it has existed, ICAA has fallen victim to the balkanization effect–internal schisms, splinters and defections–which had become a key feature of the ICAB as well. In the ICAA’s early days it was almost simultaneously called the American Catholic Apostolic Orthodox Church (...). As time progressed, the number of ICAA splinter groups soared; Congregation of Mary Mystic Rose; Liberal Apostolic Church of Christ; Charismatic Catholic Movement; Congregation of Worker Priest Missionaries; Congregation of Saint Joseph the Worker; Dissident Augustinian Congregation; Dissident Apostolic Christian Priests; Missionary Church of Evangelization–Order of the Holy Spirit, etc. etc."

== Controversy ==
The ICAA has been dogged by controversy. The ICAA's above-mentioned Missionary Church of Evangelization, founded in the 1970’s by Bruno Tinivelli Fangelli, "boasts the novelty of preserving a miraculous bleeding communion wafer, possibly inspired by a similar independent church in Mexico City. Other more recent ICAA absurdities included a scandalous roadside ‘Requiem’ Mass to the accompaniment of cuarteto music. This took place at the location of a fatal collision, which killed a cuarteto music idol, the singer Rodrigo ‘El Potro’ Bueno, in 2000." In stark contrast to the ICAA’s traditionally right-wing outlook, the head bishop officiated at a same-sex marriage. Bishop Badanelli had ordained and consecrated Alvaro Andrade Arregui, known as "Padre Pedro", who achieved notoriety in Argentina through charitable works coupled with the illegal practise of medicine, theft, insurance fraud, attempted sexual corruption of minors, and other crimes. The Roman Catholic authorities and other Catholic groups consistently warn about the dangers of associating with the ICAA.
