= Luis Fernando Castillo Mendez =

Venezuelan priest (1922–2009)

His Holiness, His Beatitude Luis Fernando Castillo Mendez
- Patriarch of Brazilian Catholic Apostolic Church, first Patriarch and Founder of Venezuelan Catholic Apostolic Church, first President of Worldwide Communion of Catholic Apostolic Churches
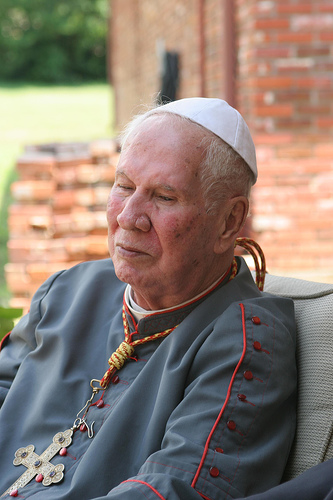
- Church: Brazilian Catholic Apostolic Church (1961–2009) previously Venezuelan Catholic Apostolic Church (1948–1961)
- Archdiocese: Brasília
- Province: Distrito Federal
- Installed: 26 March 1961
- Term ended: 29 October 2009
- Predecessor: Carlos Duarte Costa
- Successor: Josivaldo Pereira
- Previous posts: Titular Bishop of Caracas (1948–1961); Primate of the Venezuelan Catholic Apostolic Church (1948–1961); Diocesan Bishop of Uberlandia (1950–1957); Auxiliary Bishop of Rio de Janeiro (1957–1960); Patriarch of the Brazilian Catholic Apostolic Church (1961–2009); President of the Episcopal Council (1982–2009)

Orders
- Ordination: 10 August 1944 (obtained by deception) by Valentín Comellas y Santamaria
- Consecration: 3 May 1948 (considered schismatic) by Carlos Duarte Costa
- Rank: Patriarch-Primate

Personal details
- Born: 4 December 1922 Caracas, Venezuela
- Died: 29 October 2009 (aged 86) Brasília, Brazil
- Denomination: Brazilian Catholic Apostolic, and excommunicated Roman Catholic
- Coat of arms: Luis Fernando Castillo Mendez's coat of arms

Styles of Luis Fernando Castillo Mendez
- Religious style: Bishop-Patriarch

Ordination history of Luis Fernando Castillo Mendez
History
Priestly ordination
- Ordained by: Valentín Comellas y Santamaria
- Date: 10 August 1944
- Place: Solsona, Spain
Episcopal consecration
- Consecrated by: Carlos Duarte Costa
- Date: 3 May 1948
- Place: Balboa, Panama
Episcopal succession
Bishops consecrated by Luis Fernando Castillo Mendez as principal consecrator
- Forest Ernest Barber: 30 January 1985
- Bertil Persson: 14 June 1987
- Claude R. Baron: 1988
- Justo Roque González: 1989
- José Villegas: 1989
- Charles-Rafaël Payeur: 1990
- Neville David Anderson: 15 July 2005
- James Atkinson-Wake: 13 June 2006

Luis Fernando Castillo Mendez (Note: As a native of Venezuela, Castillo Mendez's family name (patronym) is "Castillo", with "Mendez" being his mother's family name. In Spanish-speaking countries, people normally have two surnames. One is inherited from the father, the other from the mother. The father's surname is written before the mother's surname and, when addressing a person formally, one usually uses the father's surname (e.g. "Señor Castillo"). (See article Spanish naming customs) However, as an immigrant to Brazil, where the custom is to place the father's surname in the final position, Castillo Mendez was normally addressed as "Mendez", even though this is technically his mother's surname. Another Brazilian custom is to address bishops and high-ranking church officials with the honorific title of "Dom" followed by the individual's first name. Thus Castillo Mendez was often addressed as "Dom Luis".) (4 December 1922 – 29 October 2009) was a Venezuelan Independent Catholic bishop. Castillo Mendez was arguably the second or third patriarch of the Brazilian Catholic Apostolic Church (ICAB) and its 48 dioceses, although none of his predecessors used that title. He was the nominal head of a network of Iglesias Catolicas Apostolicas Nacionales (ICAN) or National Catholic Apostolic Churches and the Worldwide Communion of Catholic Apostolic National Churches (WCCAC), which were unsuccessful attempts to form an international association of Independent Catholic churches.

Although he had little formal education, Castillo Mendez contrived to be ordained priest on 10 August 1944, although he was immediately censured and was at no point recognized as a Roman Catholic priest. On 8 March 1947, Castillo Mendez became the founder of the independent Venezuelan Catholic Apostolic Church (ICAV – Iglesia Católica Apostólica Venezolana). Castillo Mendez was subsequently excommunicated by the Holy See.

On 3 May 1948, he was consecrated as bishop and patriarch at the age of 25 for the Venezuelan Catholic Apostolic Church by Carlos Duarte Costa—the excommunicated former Roman Catholic bishop of Botucatu, Brazil—in the Panama Canal Zone. Castillo Mendez later succeeded Duarte Costa and became the president of the Episcopal Council of ICAB in 1982. He died on 29 October 2009.

== Biography ==
=== Early life and ministry ===
Luis Fernando Castillo Mendez was born in Caracas, Venezuela, on 4 December 1922, and baptized on 22 December in the Parish of Saint John the Baptist. His parents were Castillo Lopéz and Carmen Mendez and he had five siblings: Ramón, Domingo, Cecilia, José de Jesús and Antonio Obdulio. He was twice expelled from Roman Catholic seminaries, each after only one term, was subsequently jailed in 1938 for impersonating a priest, and was suspected of having a pathological fixation with the priesthood. He later made his way to Spain, where he presented fabricated documents apparently entitling him to be ordained priest, and on 10 August 1944, Bishop Valentín Comellas y Santamaría of Solsona ordained him to the priesthood in the Cathedral of Santa Maria. The Roman Catholic authorities immediately rejected his claim to the priesthood, and after being detained by the police he agreed to leave the country.

Upon returning to Venezuela, at a time of massive upheaval in the country, Castillo Mendez claimed to have been involved in a movement called the Curas Criollos ("Native Priests" or literally "Creole Priests"). Having learned through periodicals about the church reform movement led by the left-wing government critic and Vatican critic Dom Carlos Duarte Costa (former Roman Catholic bishop of Botucatu) in Brazil and the founder of the Brazilian Catholic Apostolic Church (separated from the Holy See and the Roman Catholic Church) in 1945, Castillo Mendez entered into correspondence with Duarte Costa. Meanwhile, as the Roman Catholic Church sought to affirm its place in society with the foundation of a new Christian Social political party, anticlerical forces from the Democratic Action and Communist parties saw it as in their interests to encourage the young 'rebel' priest, in order to discredit and disrupt the Catholic Church's plans.

=== Foundation of the Venezuelan Catholic Apostolic Church ===
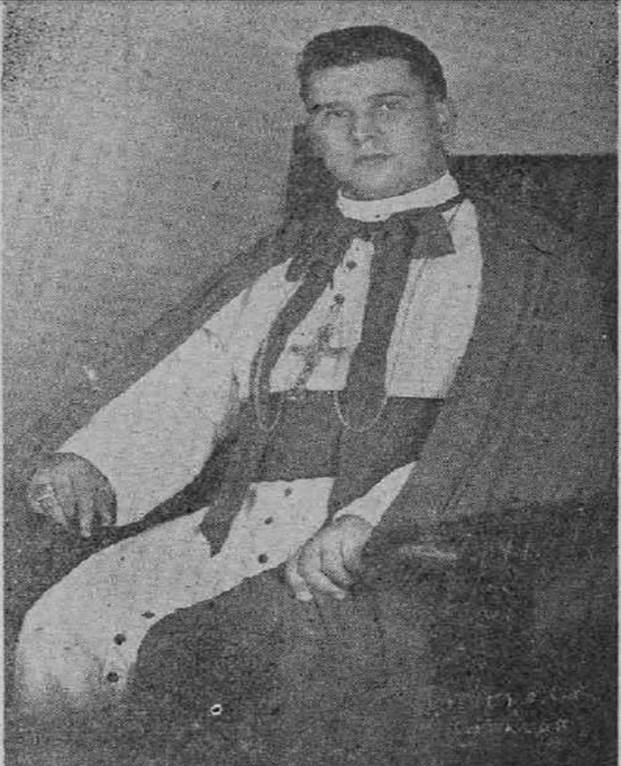
Castillo Mendez in 1948

Consequently, in 1947 Castillo Mendez and three other clergy formally established the "Venezuelan Catholic Apostolic Church". Like the Brazilian Catholic church led by its first bishop, Carlos Duarte Costa, the Venezuelan church was to be independent of the Vatican; would use Spanish instead of Latin in the liturgy; and would permit its clergy to marry. Castillo Mendez officially registered the new church with the Venezuelan Interior Ministry in early 1947, with signed affidavits from 250 fellow priests who had unanimously elected him as the bishop of Caracas. The Minister of Interior of Venezuela immediately ordered the federal police to ensure that Castillo Mendez did not wear the vestments or insignia of the office of a bishop. The new church did receive public approval from the Democratic Action and Communist parties.

On 8 March 1947, Castillo Mendez and the other three founders of the Venezuelan independent church were formally excommunicated from the Roman Church. The Roman Catholic archbishop, Lucas Guillermo Castillo, stated in the excommunication directive that the four priests had "violated fundamental dogma of the Roman Catholic Church and held concepts blasphemous, as well as several which are offensive to the person and authority of the Roman Pope Pius XII." The notice further stated that any Catholics who supported this new church would also be excommunicated.

=== Entry into the Brazilian Catholic Apostolic Church ===
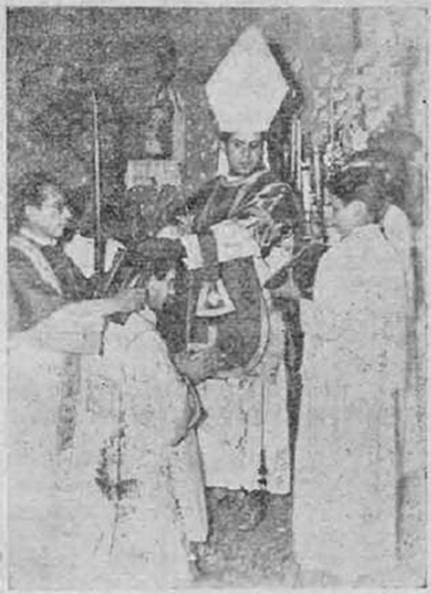
Ordination of Castillo Mendez as bishop

In 1947 Castillo Mendez was serving as pastor of St. Teresa's (National Catholic, not Roman Catholic) parish in Caracas. Having been elected leader by his fellow priests in the nascent national church, he sought to go to Brazil to receive episcopal consecration from Duarte Costa. However, the Venezuelan government did not consent to this trip, nor would it allow Duarte Costa to enter Venezuela. In the end, Castillo Mendez and Carlos Duarte Costa made arrangements to meet in the Panama Canal Zone, a territory under the jurisdiction of the United States, which did not have formal diplomatic relations with the Vatican at that time. On 3 May 1948, Costa consecrated Castillo Mendez as a bishop, with the title of bishop of Caracas and primate of Venezuela.

With an abrupt change of government, Castillo Mendez fled to Brazil on 21 June 1950, where he was installed by Duarte Costa as parish vicar and diocesan bishop of Uberlandia in the state of Minas Gerais. In 1957 he was moved to Rio de Janeiro where he served as auxiliary bishop. He was reassigned to Brasília in 1960 where he served as diocesan bishop of the state of Goiás. It is worth noting that the erection of the Diocese of Brasília predated that of the Roman Catholic archdiocese by five years, as a result of which the Roman Catholic hierarchy were forced to recognize, and never able to challenge, the title of Bishop of Brasília. In 1961, he acquired Brazilian citizenship.

=== Primacy ===
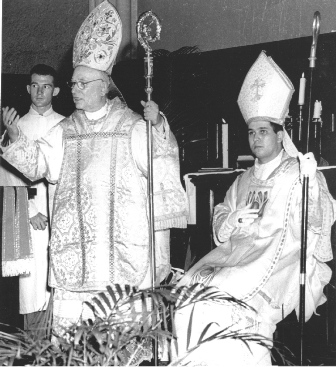
Castillo Mendez with Carlos Duarte Costa during the Episcopal Congregation in Panama

Upon Bishop Duarte Costa's death in 1961, leadership of the Brazilian Catholic Apostolic Church was apparently in a flux for several years, with several individuals leading or claiming to lead the church, often for very brief periods of time. Antidio Jose Vargas initially took over as General Supervisor, followed by Pedro dos Santos Silva as first president of the Episcopal Council, and Luigi Mascolo in the 1970s. By 1982 Castillo Mendez was undisputed leader, elected that year as president of the Episcopal Council of ICAB. In 1988 he was officially designated as the "Patriarch of ICAB", and in 1990 he was given the title of "Patriarch of ICAN (a proposed union of National Catholic Apostolic Churches)", which then became the WCCAC, the church's international communion, a position which he held until his death in 2009.

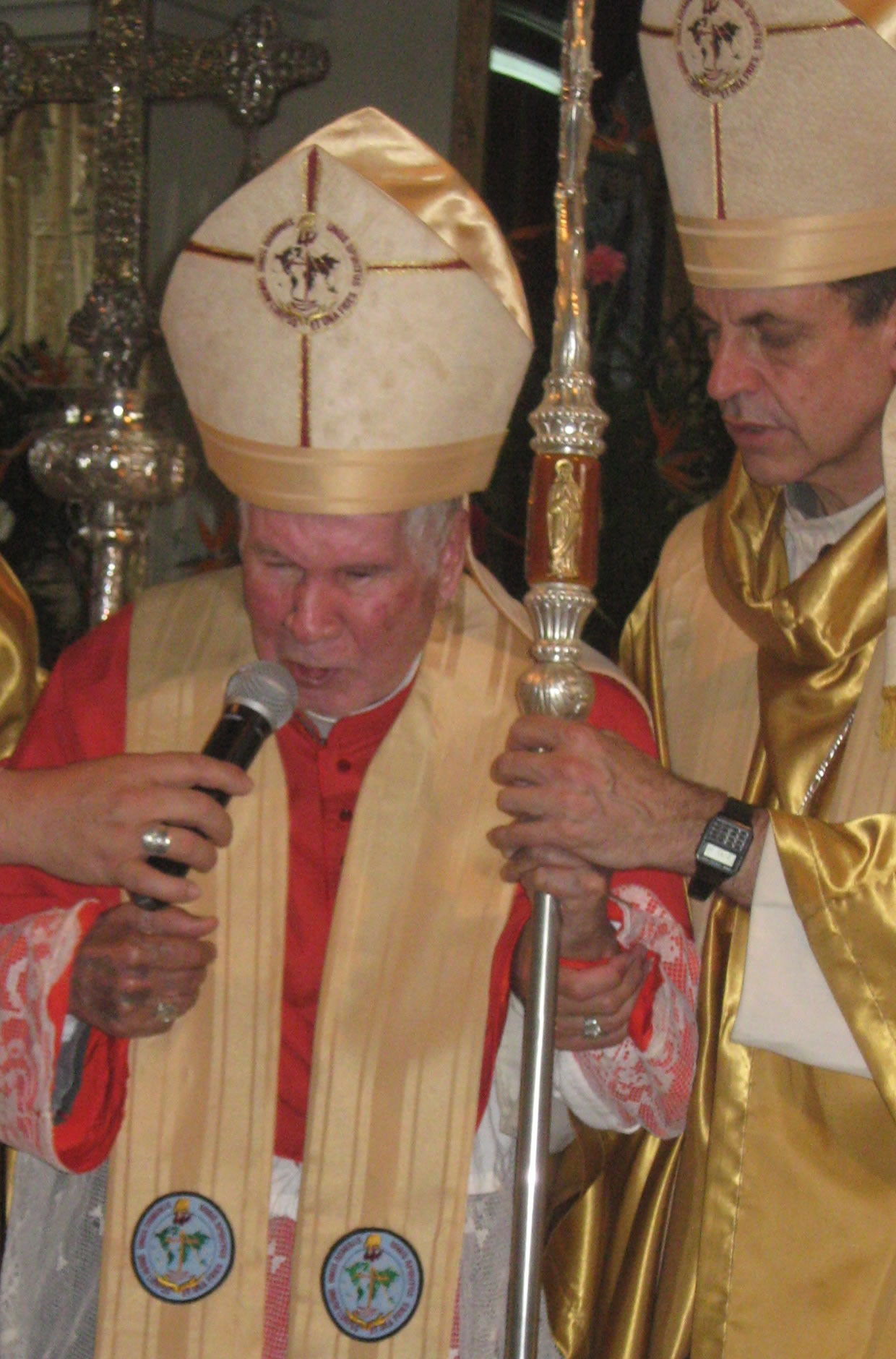
Castillo Mendez with Eduardo Aguirre Oestmann, Bishop-Primate of ICERGUA

=== Personal life ===
Despite the Brazilian Catholic Apostolic Church allowing priests and the clergy to marry, Castillo Mendez never married. He was said to recite the rosary several times every day; a practice that was abolished by the Brazilian Catholic Apostolic Church under Duarte Costa. Castillo Mendez wore the church's gray cassock with red piping but after his designation as patriarch of ICAB, he began wearing an off-white cassock and zucchetto.

=== Death ===
On the morning of 29 October 2009, Castillo Mendez suffered a severe heart attack. He was rushed to the hospital and lost consciousness; he was declared dead at approximately 9:00 am, at the age of 86, in Brasília, Brazil. He was the last living bishop consecrated by Carlos Duarte Costa. His funeral Mass took place at the Cathedral of Our Lady of the Miraculous Medal in Brasília, where his body was laid to rest; attending were the presiding bishop of ICAB, Josivaldo Perreira de Oliveira, and bishops of the ICAB Episcopal Council and a large gathering of clergy and families.

== Notes ==
Catholic Church titles
Preceded by Carlos Duarte Costa	Patriarch of Brazilian Catholic Apostolic Church; 1961–2009	Succeeded by Josivaldo Perreira de Oliveira; His title renamed as President of ICAB
Preceded by Position created	Patriarch of Venezuelan Catholic Apostolic Church; 1945–1961	Succeeded by Guillermo Antonio Pacheco Bornacelli
Preceded by Position created	President of Worldwide Communion of Catholic Apostolic Churches; 1964–2009	Succeeded by Josivaldo Pereira
Preceded by Position created	Archbishop of Brasília; 1960–2009	Succeeded by Bartolomeu Sebastiao Vilela
