= Leonardo Morizio Domínguez =

The Most Reverend Leonardo Morizio Domínguez
- Founder, Archbishop and Primate of Argentine Catholic Apostolic Church
- Church: Argentine Catholic Apostolic Church
- Elected: 1971
- Predecessor: Position created
- Other posts: Roman Catholic priest and military chaplain

Orders
- Consecration: 1972 by Luigi Mascolo

Personal details
- Born: Argentina
- Denomination: Independent Catholic, formerly Judaism and Roman Catholicism

Leonardo Morizio Domínguez was an Argentine former Roman Catholic priest who was the first archbishop and primate of the Argentine Catholic Apostolic Church (ICAA), an independent Catholic Church in Argentina.

== Biography ==
Morizio was born in Argentina, converted to Catholicism from Judaism, and was ordained a Roman Catholic priest. He was a military chaplain during the 1960s but came to disagree with the positions of the Vatican, and sought consecration from Bishops of the Brazilian Catholic Apostolic Church (ICAB), setting up a similar organization in Argentina.

Morizio separated from the Catholic Church and founded ICAA in Buenos Aires in 1971. He was consecrated as archbishop and primate in 1972 by Luigi Mascolo, an ICAB bishop. Morizio later consecrated the author and polemicist Pedro Ruiz Badanelli as bishop in 1973 and José Eugenio Tenca Rusconi as bishop in 1983.

Morizio was associated with the right wing of Peronism and José López Rega's attempt to create a national church of Argentina.
