= Mystic Rose =

Mystic Rose or The Mystic Rose may refer to:

== Religion ==
- Miracle of the roses, a miracle in which roses manifest an activity of God or a saint
- Mystical rose (symbol of the Virgin Mary), a Christian symbol
- Rosa Mystica, a title of Mary, mother of Jesus
  - Rosa Mystica apparition, a Marian apparition to Pierina Gilli
- Instituto María Rosa Mystica, Sacerdotes Carismáticos Misioneros (Institute of Mary Mystical Rose – Charismatic Missionary Priests), an Argentine Independent Catholic association
- Mystic Rose, a meditative therapy developed by Rajneesh
- Mystic Rose, a former outer order of the magical organisation Stella Matutina

== Literature ==
- The Mystic Rose, an 1885 poetry collection by Stanislas de Guaita
- The Mystic Rose: A Study of Primitive Marriage, a 1902 book by Ernest Crawley
- The Mystic Rose, a 2001 novel by Stephen R. Lawhead
- The Mystic Rose Garden, a 14th-century poetry collection by Mahmoud Shabestari

== Other uses ==
- Complete graph, also known as a mystic rose, a simple undirected graph in which every pair of distinct vertices is connected by a unique edge
- Caroline Schermerhorn Astor (1830–1908), nicknamed the "Mystic Rose", American socialite
