= Patriarch =

Highest-ranking bishop in Christianity

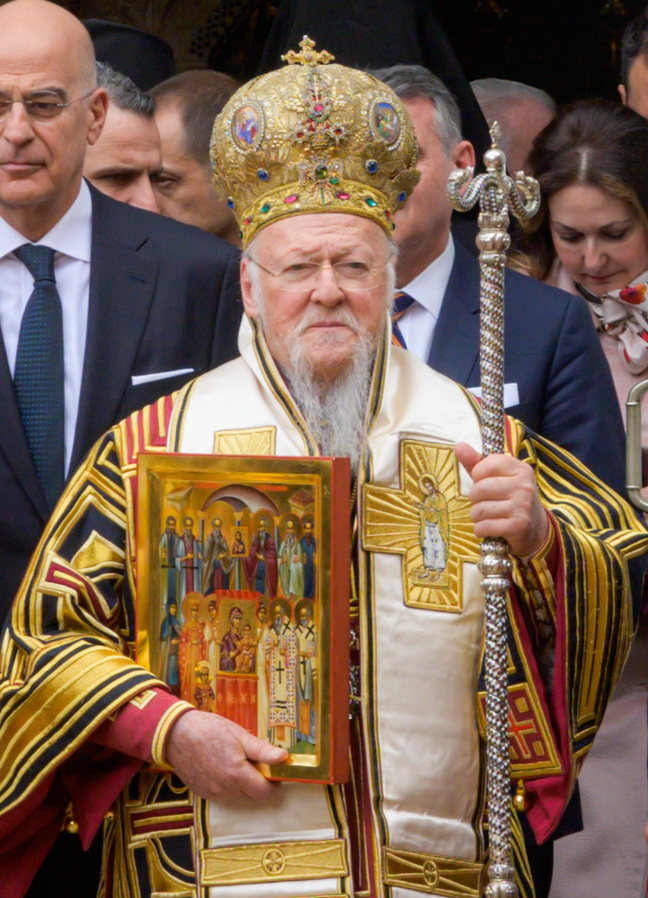
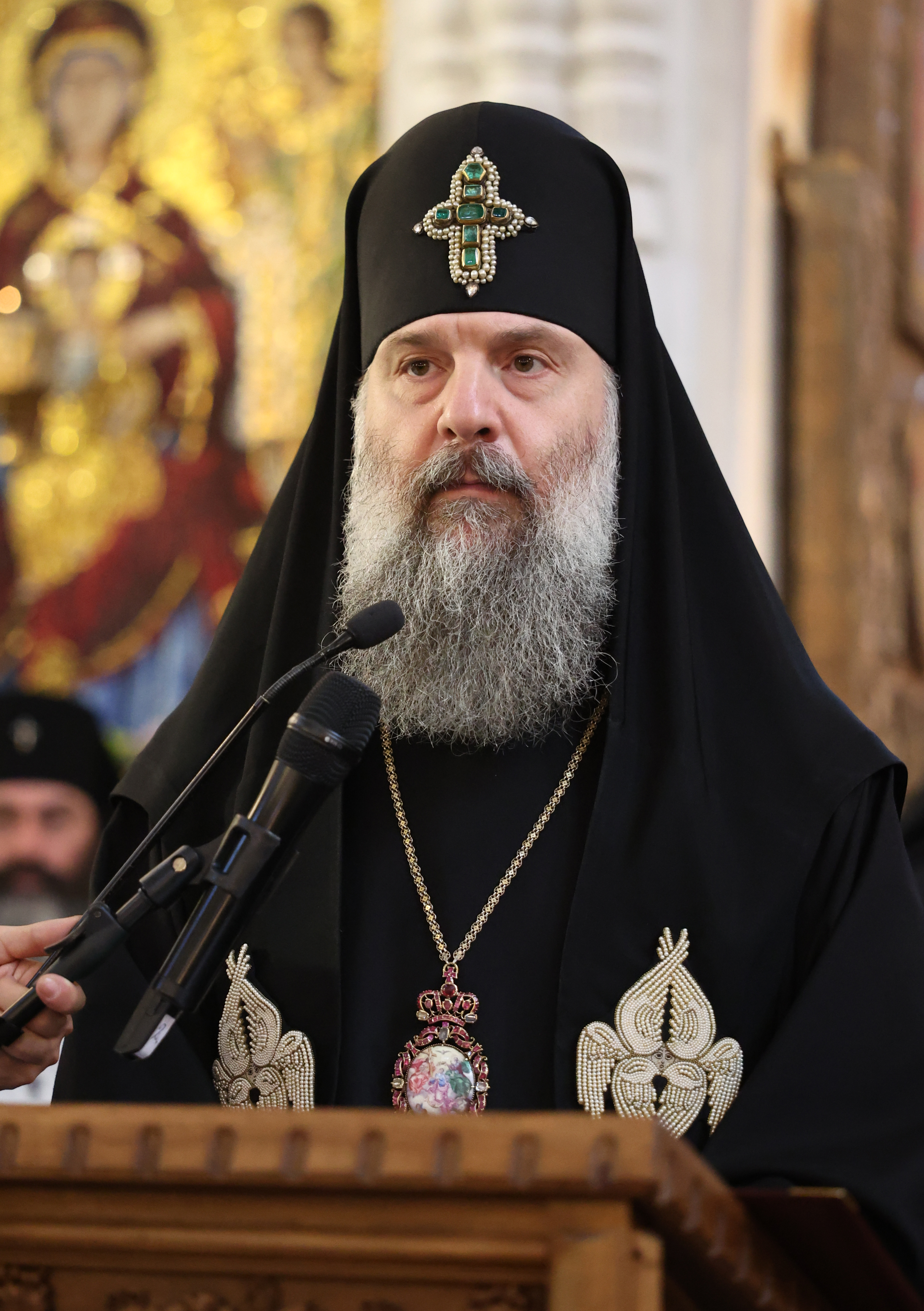
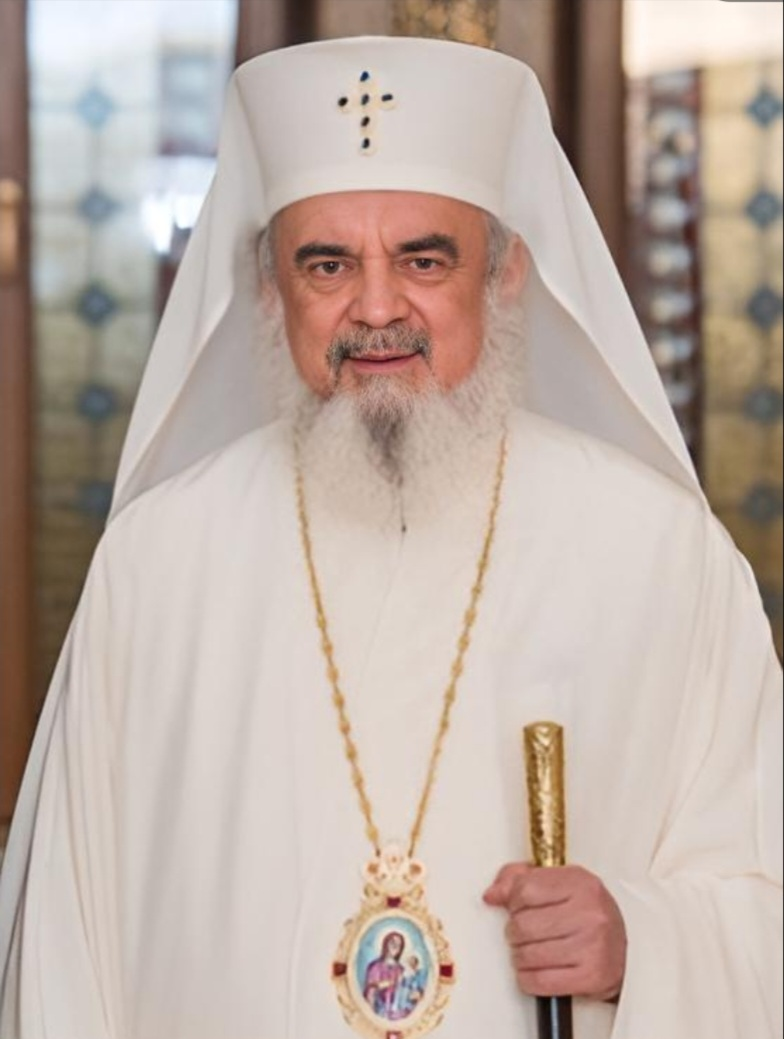
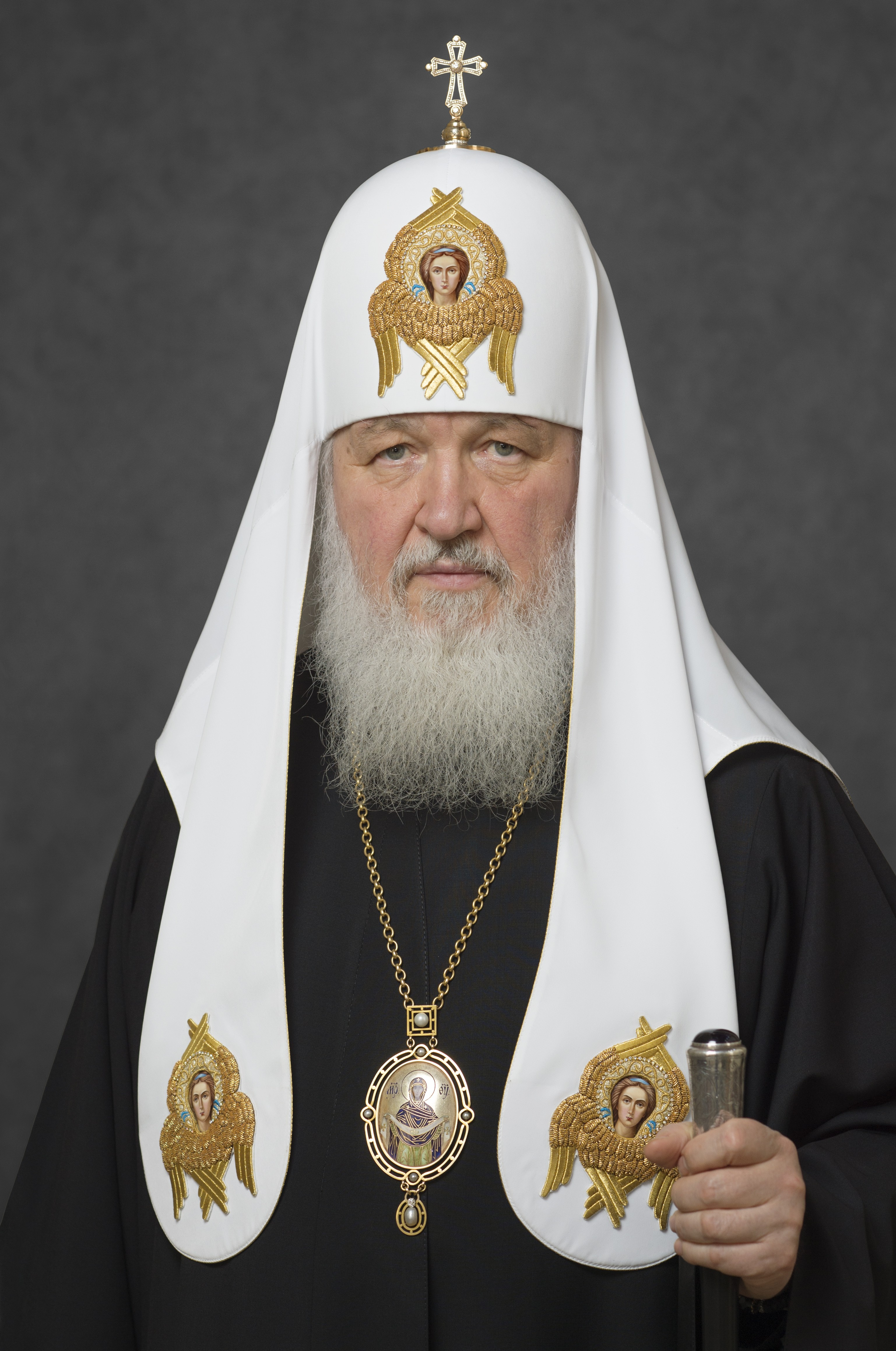
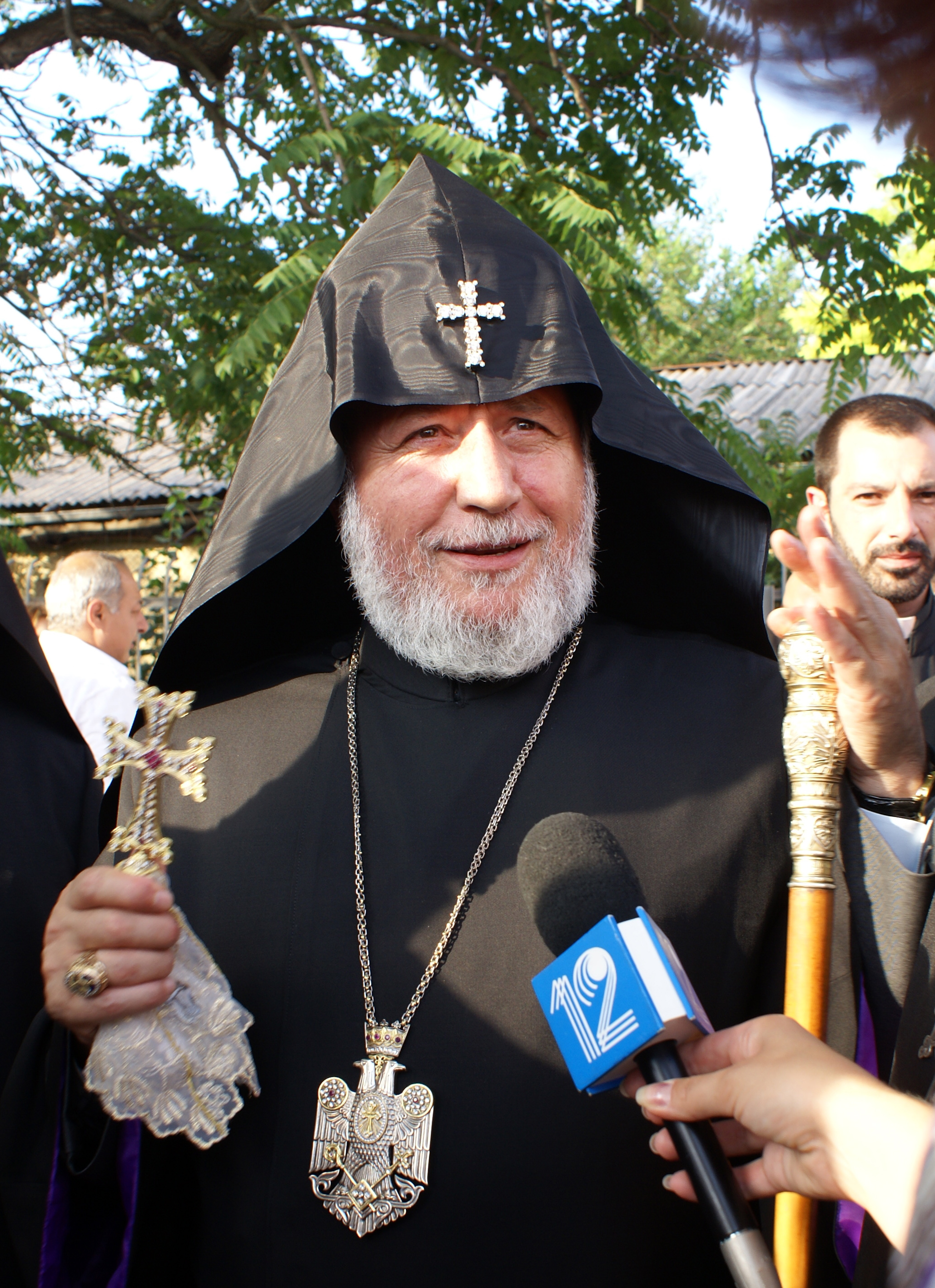
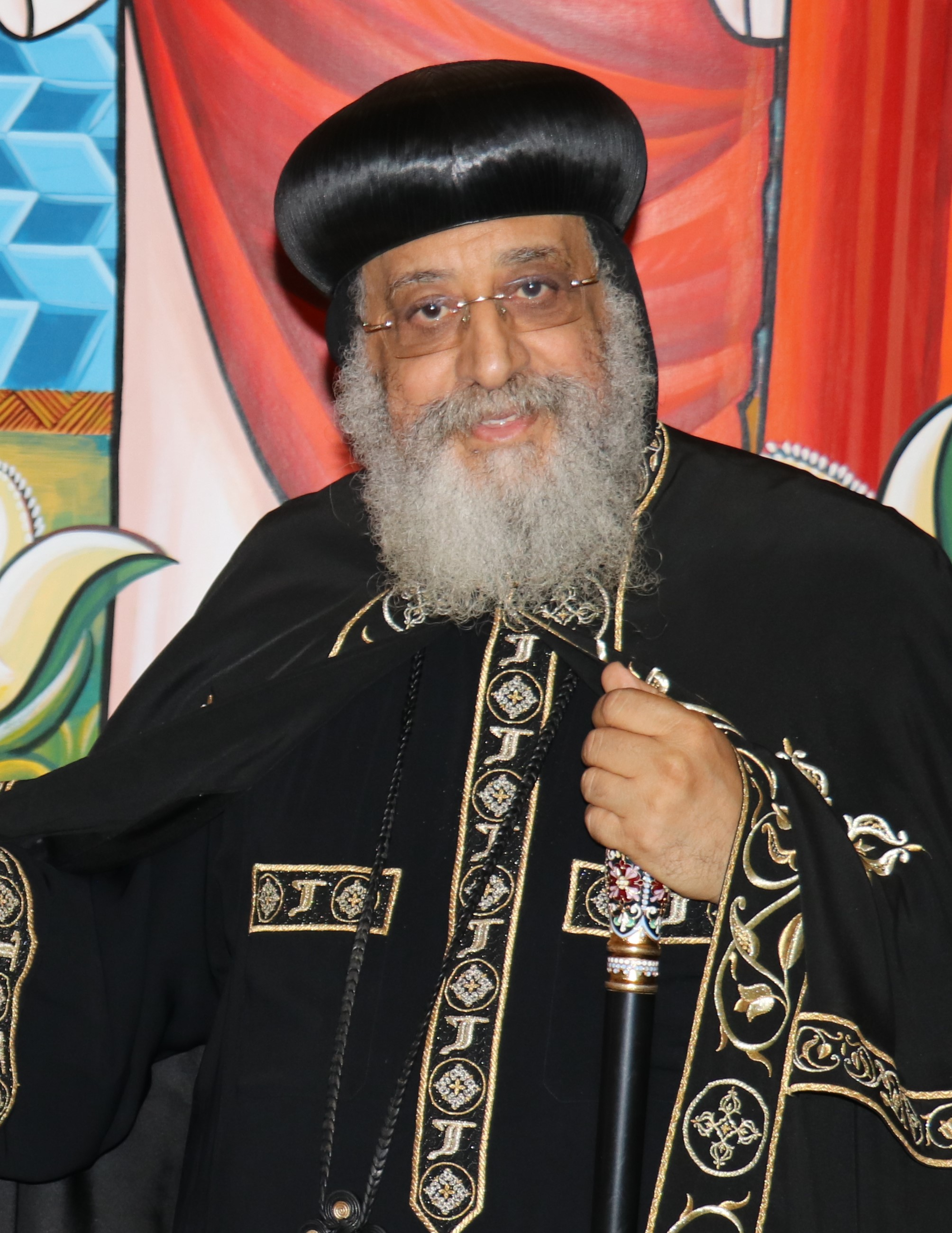
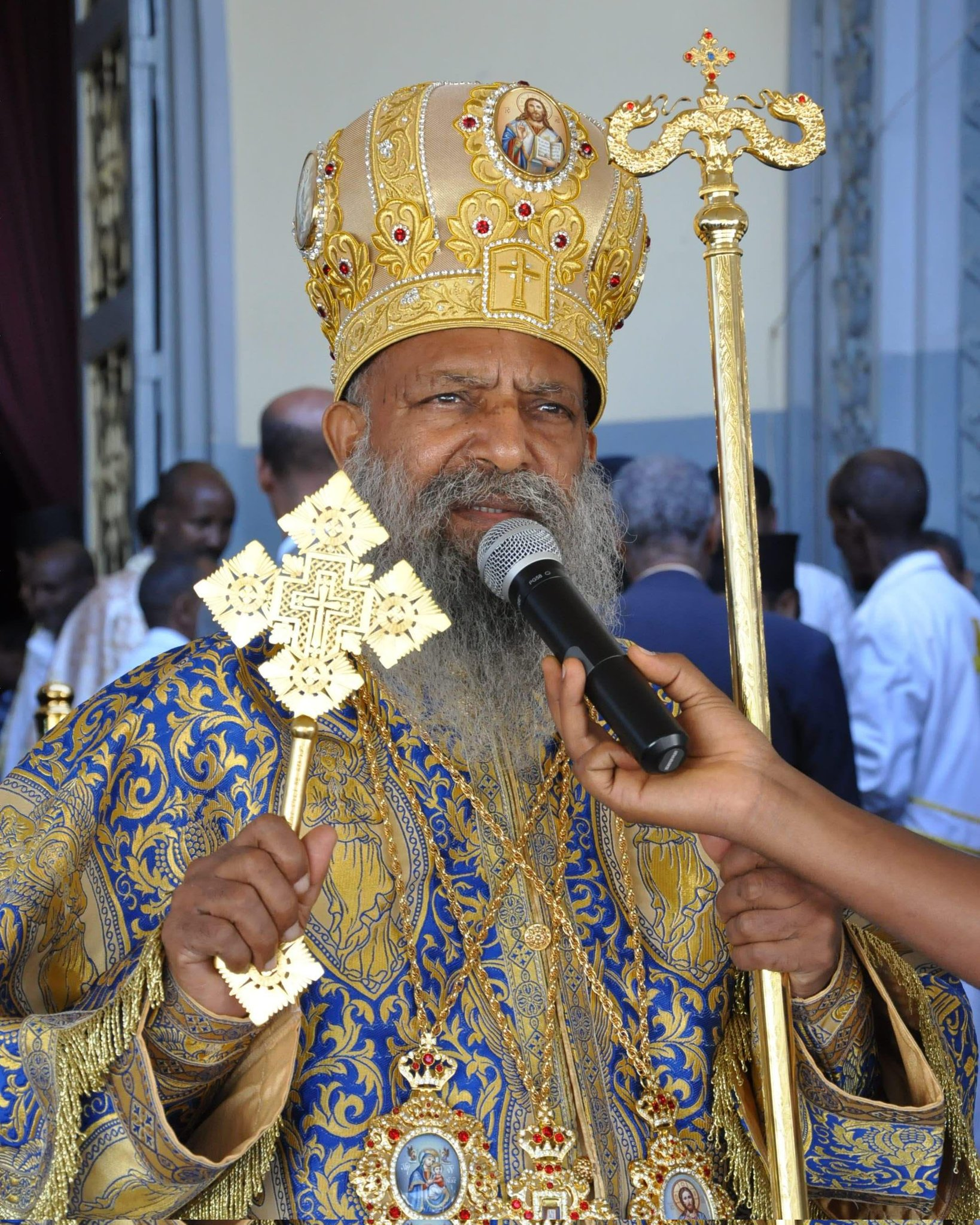
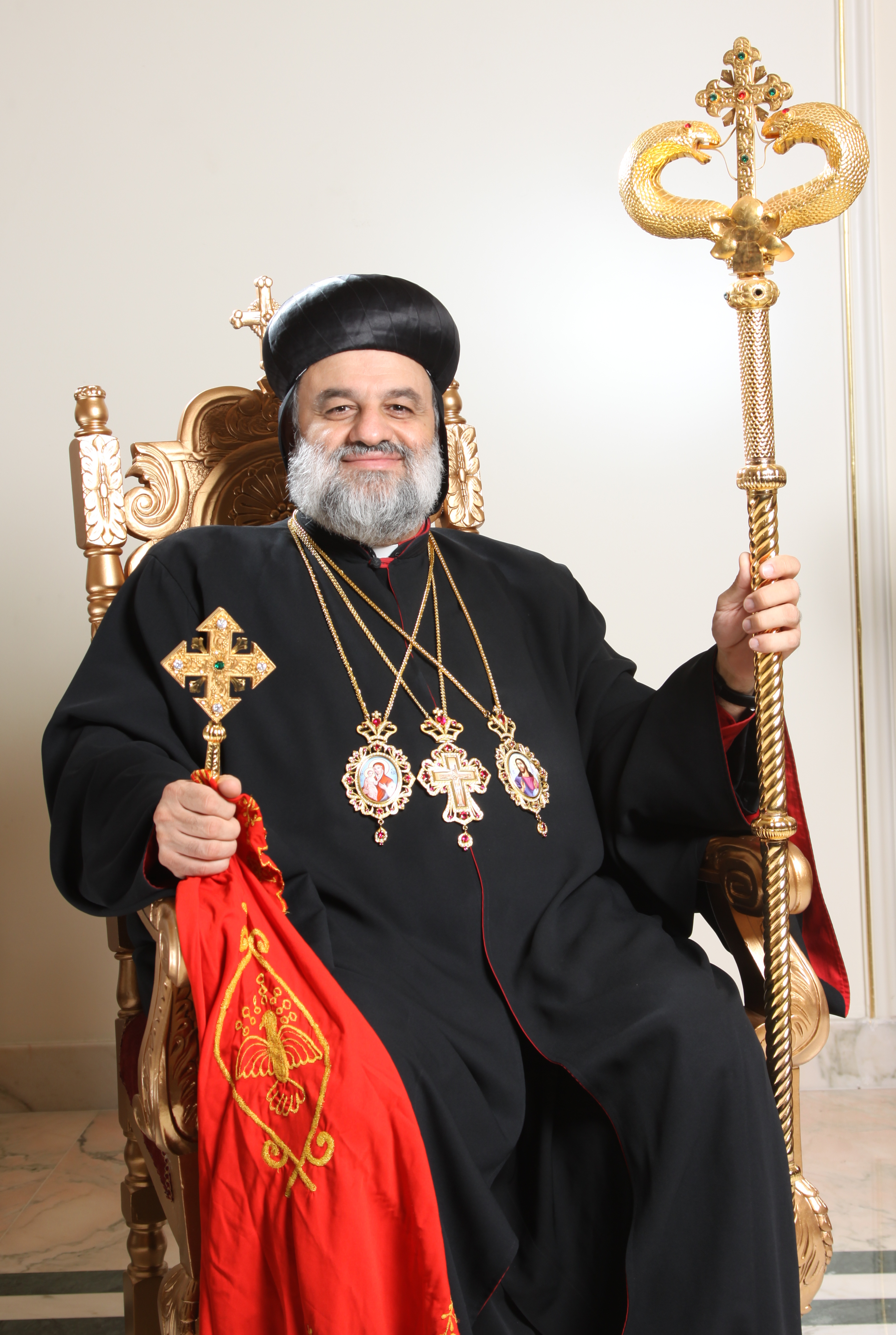
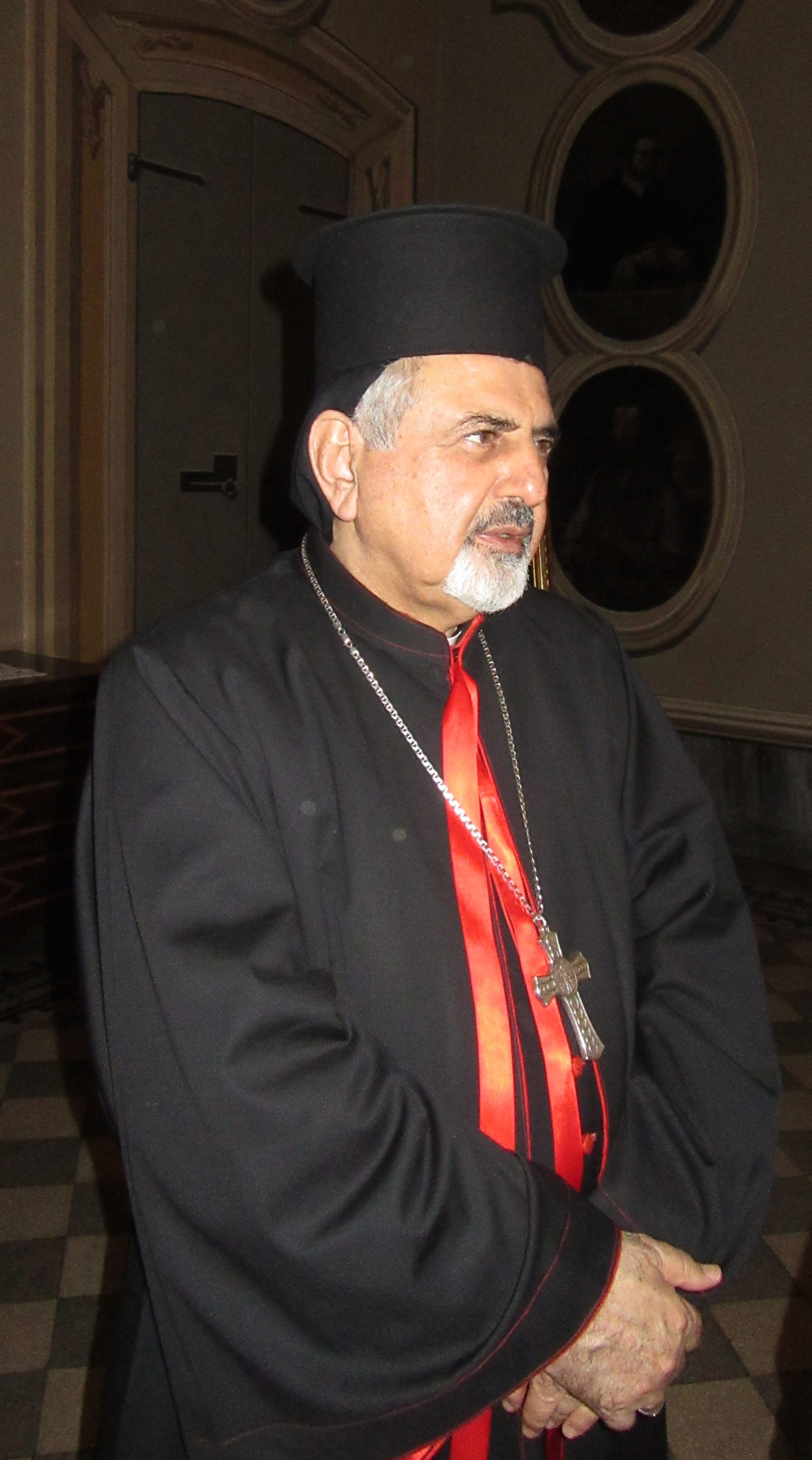
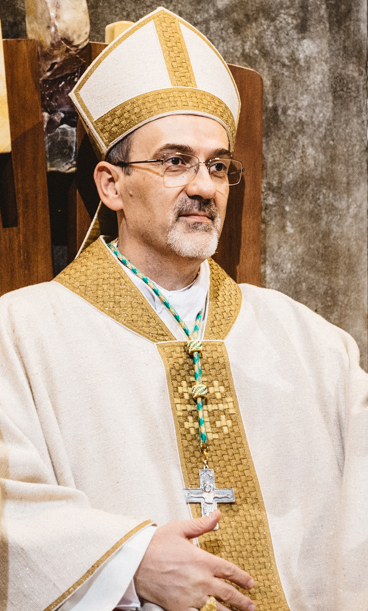
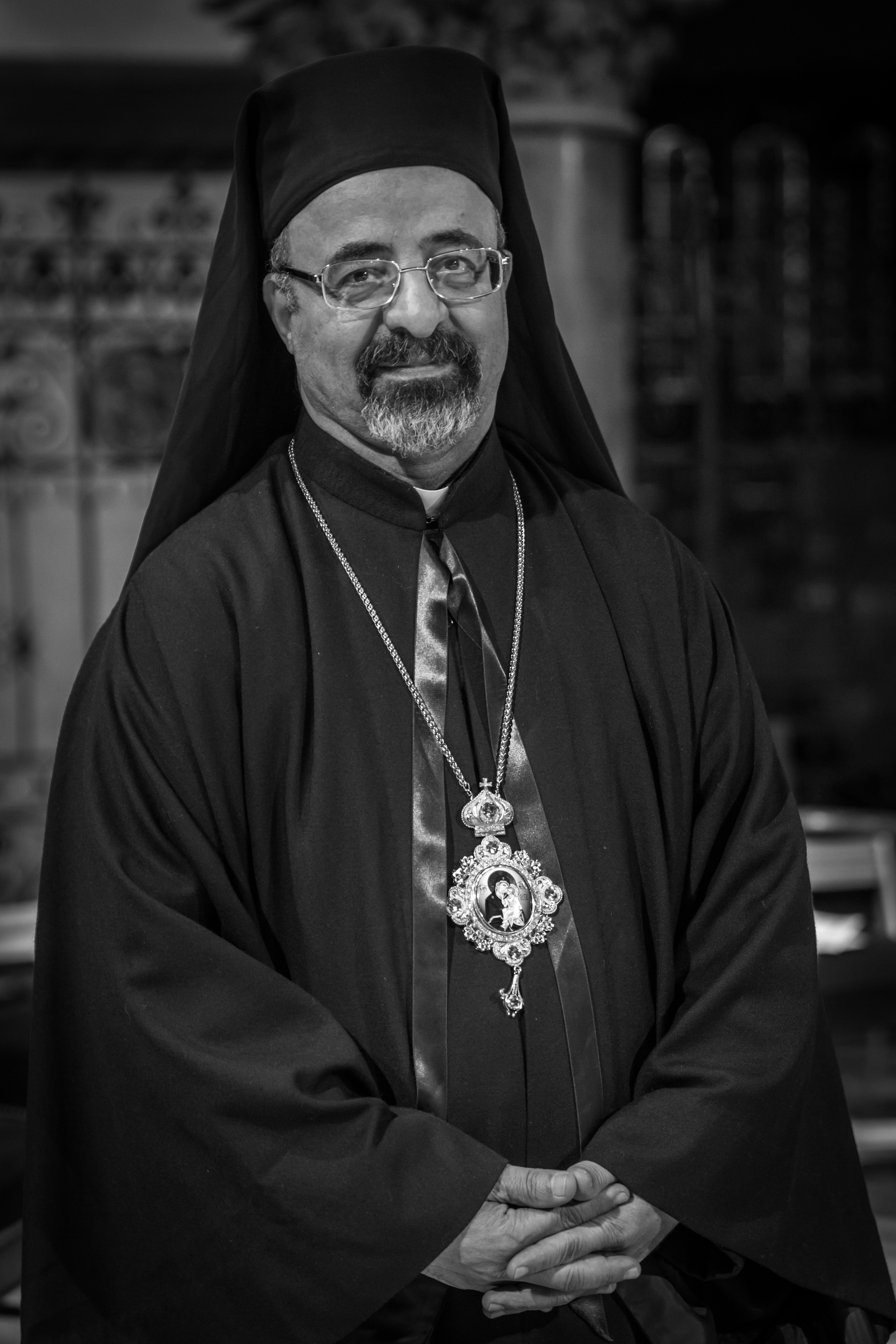
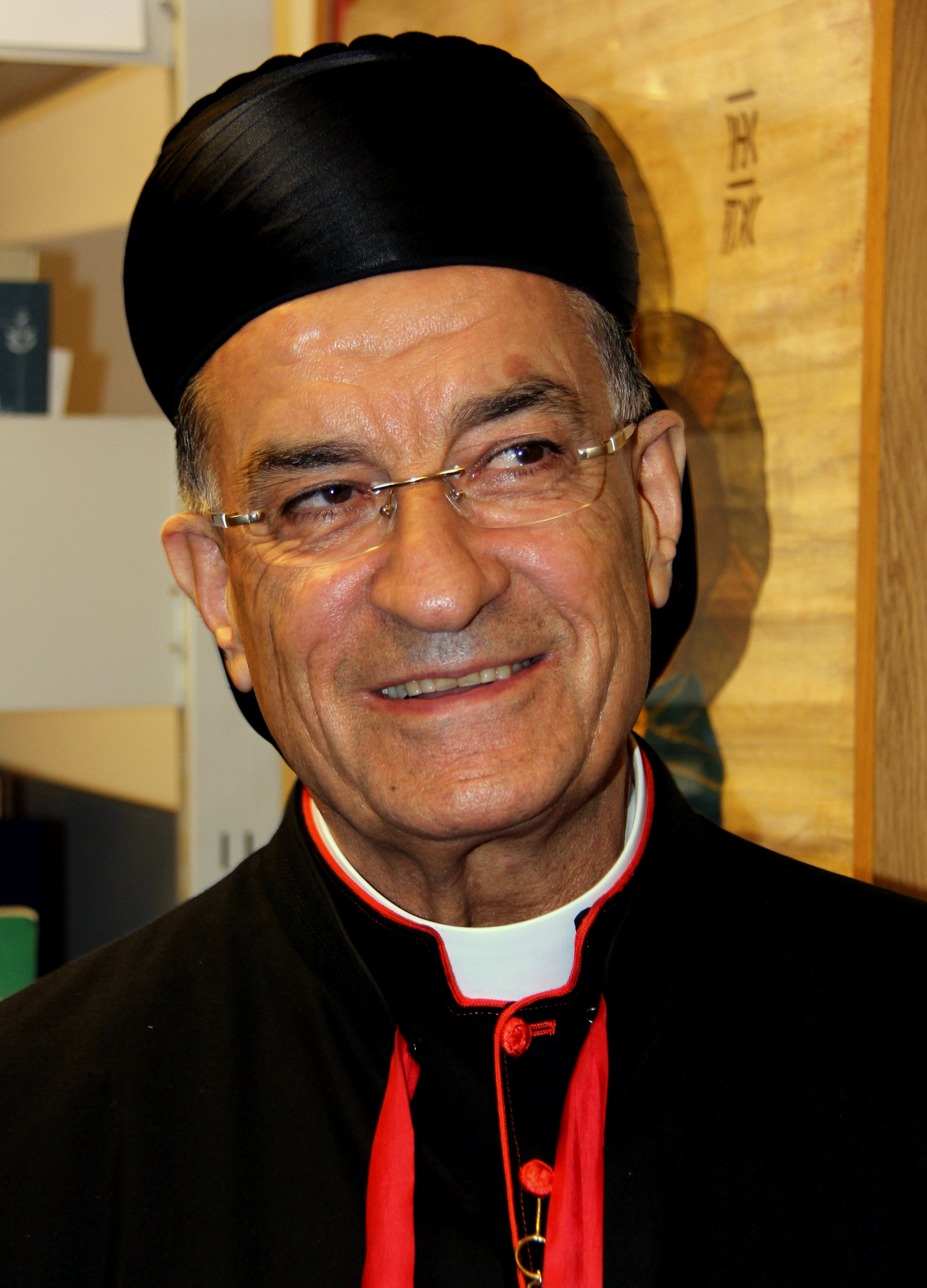
Patriarchs in different Christian confessions, including Eastern Orthodoxy, Oriental Orthodoxy and Catholicism respectively from left to right:
Eastern Orthodox: Ecumenical Patriarch of Constantinople Bartholomew I, Catholicos-Patriarch of All Georgia Shio III, Patriarch of All Romania Daniel I and Patriarch of Moscow and all Rus' Kirill I
Oriental Orthodox: Patriarch of Armenia Garegin II, Coptic Orthodox Patriarch of Alexandria Tawadros II, Patriarch-Catholicos of All Ethiopia Mathias I and Syriac Orthodox Patriarch of Antioch Ignatius Aphrem II
Catholic: Syriac Catholic Patriarch of Antioch Ignatius Joseph III Yonan, Latin Patriarch of Jerusalem Pierbattista Pizzaballa, Coptic Catholic Patriarch of Alexandria Ibrahim Isaac Sidrak and Maronite Patriarch of Antioch Bechara Boutros al-Rahi

The highest-ranking bishops in Eastern Orthodoxy, Oriental Orthodoxy, the Catholic Church (above major archbishop and primate), the Hussite Church, Church of the East and some Independent Catholic Churches are termed patriarchs (and in certain cases also popes – such as the pope of Rome or pope of Alexandria).

The word is derived from Greek πατριάρχης (patriarchēs), meaning "chief or father of a family", a compound of πατριά (patria), meaning "family", and ἄρχειν (archein), meaning "to rule".

Originally, a patriarch was a man who exercised authority as a pater familias over an extended family. The system of such rule of families by senior males is termed "patriarchy". Historically, a patriarch has often been the logical choice to act as ethnarch of the community identified with his religious confession within a state or empire of a different creed (such as Christians within the Ottoman Empire). The term developed an ecclesiastical meaning within Christianity. The office and the ecclesiastical circumscription of a Christian patriarch is termed a patriarchate.

Abraham, Isaac and Jacob are referred to as the three patriarchs of the people of Israel, and the period during which they lived is termed the Patriarchal Age. The word patriarch originally acquired its religious meaning in the Septuagint version of the Bible.

== Catholic Church ==
Catholic Patriarchal (non cardinal) coat of arms

=== Patriarchs ===
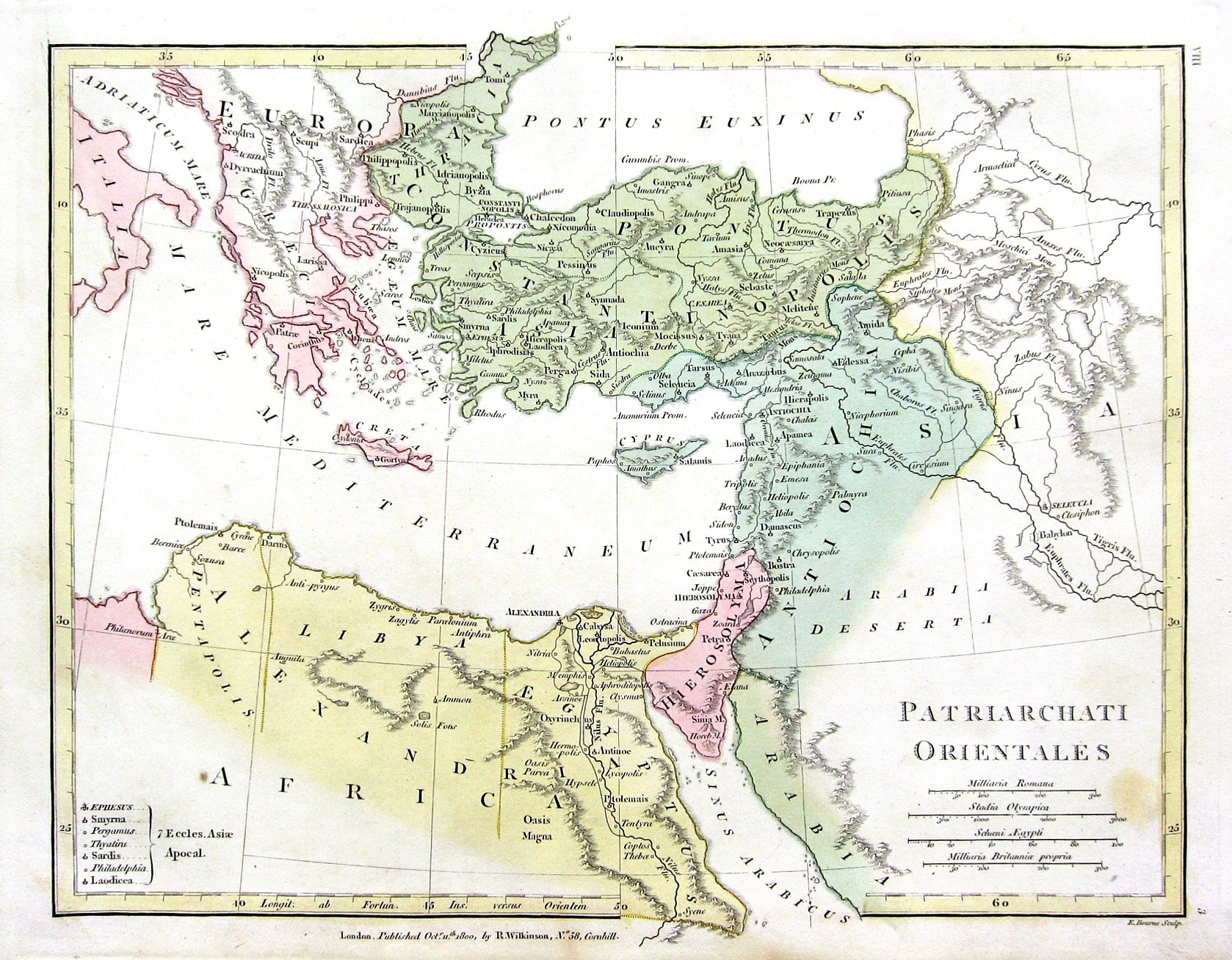
Map of Justinian's Pentarchy

In the Catholic Church, the bishop who is head of a particular autonomous church, known in canon law as a church sui iuris, is ordinarily a patriarch, though this responsibility can be entrusted to a major archbishop, metropolitan, or other prelate for a number of reasons.

Since the Council of Nicaea, the bishop of Rome has been recognized as first among patriarchs. That council designated three bishops with this 'supra-Metropolitan' title: Rome, Alexandria, and Antioch. In the Pentarchy formulated by Justinian I (527–565), the emperor assigned to the bishop of Rome a patriarchate covering the whole of Christianized Europe (including almost all of modern Greece), except Thrace, the areas around Constantinople, and the Black Sea coast. He also included the western part of North Africa in this patriarchate. The jurisdictions of the other patriarchates extended over Roman Asia and the rest of Africa. Justinian's system was given formal ecclesiastical recognition by the Quinisext Council of 692, which the see of Rome has, however, not recognized.

There were at the time bishops of other apostolic sees that operated with patriarchal authority beyond the borders of the Roman Empire, such as the catholicos of Selucia-Ctesephon.

Today, the patriarchal heads of Catholic autonomous churches are:

- The Patriarch of Rome (Pope), as head of the Latin Church
- The Coptic Catholic Patriarch of Alexandria (Pope) and head of the Coptic Catholic Church, recognised in 1824
- The Maronite Catholic Patriarch of Antioch and All the East and head of the Maronite Church, recognised in 685
- The Melkite Greek Catholic Patriarch of Antioch and All the East, of Alexandria and of Jerusalem, head of the Melkite Greek Catholic Church; in his case, Antioch is the actual and sole patriarchate, Alexandria and Jerusalem are just titular (once residential) patriarchates vested in his see.
- The Syriac Catholic Patriarch of Antioch and All the East and head of the Syriac Catholic Church
- The Chaldean Catholic Patriarch of Baghdad and head of the Chaldean Catholic Church, recognised in 1553
- The Armenian Catholic Patriarch of Cilicia and head of the Armenian Catholic Church, recognised in 1742

Four more of the Eastern Catholic Churches are headed by a prelate known as a "Major Archbishop", a title essentially equivalent to that of Patriarch and originally created by Pope Paul VI in 1963 for Josyf Slipyj.

=== Minor Latin patriarchates ===
Minor patriarchs do not have jurisdiction over other metropolitan bishops. The title is granted purely as an honour for various historical reasons. They take precedence after the heads of autonomous churches in full communion, whether pope, patriarch, or major archbishop.

- The Latin Patriarch of Jerusalem, established in 1099.
- The Patriarch of the East Indies, a titular patriarchal see, united to Goa and Daman, established in 1886.
- The Patriarch of Lisbon, established in 1716.
- The Patriarch of Venice, established in 1451.

==== Historical Latin patriarchates ====
- The Patriarch of Aquileia – with rival line of succession moved to Grado – dissolved in 1752.
- The Patriarch of Grado – in 1451 merged with the Bishopric of Castello and Venice to form the Metropolitan Archdiocese of Venice (later, a residential Patriarchate itself).
- The Patriarch of the West Indies – a titular patriarchal see, vacant since 1963.
- The Latin Patriarch of Antioch – title abolished in 1964.
- The titular Latin Patriarch of Alexandria – title abolished in 1964.
- The Latin Patriarch of Constantinople – title abolished in 1964.
- The Latin Patriarchate of Ethiopia – from 1555 to 1663, never effective, only held by Iberian Jesuits

==== Patriarch as title ad personam ====
The pope can confer the rank of patriarch without any see, upon an individual archbishop, as happened on 24 February 1676 to Alessandro Crescenzi, of the Somascans, former Latin Titular Patriarch of Alexandria (19 January 1671 – retired 27 May 1675), who nevertheless resigned the title on 9 January 1682.

==== Patriarch of the West ====
One of the pope's traditional titles in some eras and contexts has been "Patriarch of the West" (Latin: Patriarcha Occidentis; Greek: Πατριάρχης τῆς Δύσεως), highlighting the role of the bishop of Rome as the highest authority of the Latin Church.

The title was not included in the 2006 Annuario Pontificio. On 22 March 2006, the Pontifical Council for Promoting Christian Unity offered an explanation for the decision to remove the title. It stated that the title "Patriarch of the West" had become "obsolete and practically unusable" when the term the West comprises Australia, New Zealand and North America in addition to Western Europe, and that it was "pointless to insist on maintaining it" given that, since the Second Vatican Council, the Latin Church, for which "the West" is an equivalent, has been organized as a number of episcopal conferences and their international groupings. The title was reintroduced in the 2024 edition of Annuario Pontificio.

=== Current and historical Catholic patriarchates ===
Current and historical Catholic patriarchates
Type	Church	Patriarchate	Patriarch
Patriarchs of autonomous particular churches	Latin	Rome	Pope Leo XIV
Patriarchs of autonomous particular churches	Coptic	Alexandria-C	Ibrahim Isaac Sidrak
Patriarchs of autonomous particular churches	Syrian	Antioch-S	Ignatius Joseph III Younan
Patriarchs of autonomous particular churches	Maronite	Antioch-M	Bechara Boutros al-Rahi
Patriarchs of autonomous particular churches	Greek-Melkite	Antioch-GM	Youssef Absi
Patriarchs of autonomous particular churches	Armenian	Cilicia	Raphaël Bedros XXI Minassian
Patriarchs of autonomous particular churches	Chaldean	Baghdad	Paul III Nona
Titular; Latin Church patriarchs	Latin	Aquileia	suppressed in 1751
Titular; Latin Church patriarchs	Latin	Grado	suppressed in 1451
Titular; Latin Church patriarchs	Latin	Jerusalem	Pierbattista Pizzaballa
Titular; Latin Church patriarchs	Latin	Lisbon	Rui Valério
Titular; Latin Church patriarchs	Latin	Venice	Francesco Moraglia
Titular; Latin Church patriarchs	Latin	Alexandria-L	suppressed in 1964
Titular; Latin Church patriarchs	Latin	Antioch-L	suppressed in 1964
Titular; Latin Church patriarchs	Latin	Constantinople	suppressed in 1964
Titular; Latin Church patriarchs	Latin	East Indies	Filipe Neri Ferrão
Titular; Latin Church patriarchs	Latin	West Indies	vacant since 1963

=== Motu proprio Mutua Concordia ===
Under the provision of Mutua Concordia, an Apostolic Letter published on August 29, 2026, Pope Leo XIV restore the tradition for Eastern Synods, to have the faculty to remove Patriarchs from office with a "secret ballot of at least two-thirds of the members of the Synod entitled to vote". The Pope has the final power of confirming a Synod's decision.

== Eastern Christianity ==
=== Eastern Orthodox ===
- The five ancient Patriarchates, the Pentarchy, listed in order of preeminence ranked by the Quinisext Council of 692:

The five ancient Patriarchates (the Pentarchy)
Title	Church	Recognition / Additional notes
Patriarch of Rome	the Pope of Rome	Originally "primus inter pares" according to Eastern Orthodoxy, recognized in 325 by the First Council of Nicaea. Currently, not an Episcopal or Patriarchal authority in the Eastern Orthodox Church, following the Great Schism in 1054.
Patriarch of Constantinople	the chief of the Ecumenical Patriarchate of Constantinople	The "primus inter pares" of post-Schism Eastern Orthodoxy. Recognized in 451 by the Council of Chalcedon.
Patriarch of Alexandria	the Pope of All Africa and the chief of the Greek Orthodox Church of Alexandria	Recognized in 325 by the First Council of Nicaea.
Patriarch of Antioch	the head of the Greek Orthodox Church of Antioch and All the East, in the Near East	Recognized in 325 by the First Council of Nicaea.
Patriarch of Jerusalem	the chief of the Eastern Orthodox Patriarchate of Jerusalem in Israel, Palestine, Jordan and All Arabia	Recognized in 451 by the Council of Chalcedon.

- The five junior Patriarchates created after the consolidation of the Pentarchy, in chronological order of their recognition as Patriarchates by the Ecumenical Patriarchate of Constantinople:

The five junior Patriarchates created after the consolidation of the Pentarchy
Title	Church	Recognition / Additional notes
Patriarch of All Bulgaria	the chief of the Bulgarian Orthodox Church in Bulgaria	Recognized as a Patriarchate in 918-919/927
Catholicos-Patriarch of All Georgia	the chief of the Georgian Orthodox Church in Georgia	Recognized as a Catholicate (Patriarchate) in 1008
Serbian Patriarch	the chief of the Serbian Orthodox Church in Serbia and the neighboring countries	Recognized as a Patriarchate in 1375
Patriarch of Moscow and All Russia	the chief of the Russian Orthodox Church in Russia	Recognized as a Patriarchate in 1593
Patriarch of All Romania	the chief of the Romanian Orthodox Church in Romania	Recognized as a Patriarchate in 1925

=== Patriarchs outside the Eastern Orthodox Communion ===
Patriarchs outside the Eastern Orthodox Communion
Title	Church
Patriarch of Moscow and All Russia	The chief of the Russian Old-Orthodox Church.
The Patriarch of Kyiv and All Rus-Ukraine	The chief of the Ukrainian Autocephalous Orthodox Church Canonical.
Patriarch of the Autocephalous Turkish Orthodox Patriarchate	

=== Oriental Orthodox Churches ===
Oriental Orthodox leaders
Church	Title	Authority	Additional notes
Coptic Orthodox Church	Pope of Alexandria and Patriarch of All Africa	The chief of the Coptic Orthodox Church of Alexandria in Egypt and All Africa	
Ethiopian Orthodox Church	Archbishop of Axum and Patriarch Catholicos of All Ethiopia	Chief of the Ethiopian Orthodox Tewahedo Church in Ethiopia	
Eritrean Orthodox Church	Archbishop of Asmara and Patriarch of All Eritrea	Chief of the Eritrean Orthodox Tewahedo Church in Eritrea	
Syriac Orthodox Church	Patriarch of Antioch and All the East	Supreme Head of Universal Syriac Orthodox Church	Syriac Orthodox Patriarch of Antioch and all the east
Syriac Orthodox Church	Catholicos of India Maphrian of the East	The second highest ecclesiastical authority in the Syriac Orthodox Church. He is also the Malankara Metropolitan of Malankara Jacobite Syrian Orthodox Church	The Regional head of the Jacobite Syrian Orthodox Church
Indian Orthodox Church	Catholicos of the East.	Holds the additional title of Malankara Metropolitan	The supreme leader of the Malankara Orthodox Syrian Church
Armenian Orthodox Church	Catholicos of Etchmiadzin, Armenia and of All Armenians	Supreme leader of the Armenian Apostolic Church	Supreme Patriarch of the Armenian Apostolic Church
Armenian Orthodox Church	Catholicos of Cilicia	Chief of the Armenian Apostolic Church of the Great House of Cilicia	Chief of Diasporan Armenians of the Armenian Apostolic Church. Headquartered in Antelias, Lebanon
Armenian Orthodox Church	---Armenian Patriarch of Constantinople	Chief of the Armenians in Turkey.	
Armenian Orthodox Church	---Armenian Patriarch of Jerusalem and of Holy Zion	Chief of Armenians in Jerusalem, Israel, Palestine, Jordan and the Persian Gulf	

=== Church of the East ===
Catholicose of the East is the title that held by the ecclesiastical heads of the Church of the East, which is now divided into:

- Catholicos-Patriarch of the Assyrian Church of the East.
- Catholicos-Patriarchs of the Ancient Church of the East (since 1964)

== Other Christian denominations ==
The title of "Patriarch" is assumed also by for leaders and church officers of certain Christian denominations, including some of the following:

Hussite

- The Patriarch of the Czechoslovak Hussite Church mainly in the Czech Republic and also some parts of Slovakia.

Independent Catholic

- The Patriarch of the Catholic Apostolic Church of Antioch.
- The Patriarch of the Apostolic Catholic Church in the Philippines.
- The Patriarch of the Brazilian Catholic Apostolic Church in Brazil (Not officially used, but described in a similarly holy level).
- The Patriarch of the Venezuelan Catholic Apostolic Church in Venezuela.

Independent Eastern Catholic

- The Patriarch of the Ukrainian Orthodox Greek Catholic Church in Ukraine.

Independent Eastern Orthodox

- The Patriarch of the American Orthodox Catholic Church.

Independent Oriental Orthodox

- The Patriarch of the British Orthodox Church.

Protestant

- The Patriarch of the International Communion of the Charismatic Episcopal Church.

Latter-Day Saint movement

In the Latter-Day Saint movement, a patriarch is one who has been ordained to the office of patriarch in the Melchizedek priesthood. The term is considered synonymous with the term evangelist, a term favored by the Community of Christ. In the Church of Jesus Christ of Latter-day Saints, one of the patriarch's primary responsibilities is to give patriarchal blessings, as Jacob did to his twelve sons according to the Old Testament. Patriarchs are typically assigned in each stake and possess the title for life.

== Manichaeism ==
The term patriarch has also been used for the leader of the extinct Manichaean religion, initially based at Ctesiphon (near modern-day Baghdad) and later at Samarkand.

== See also ==
- List of current patriarchs
- Lists of Patriarchs
- Catholicos
- Patriarchate
- Patriarchy
- Matriarchy
- Lists of popes, patriarchs, primates, archbishops, and bishops
- Major archbishop
- List of metropolitans and patriarchs of Moscow
- Rishama in Mandaeism
