= Venezuelan Catholic Apostolic Church =

Independent Catholic church in Venezuela

- Iglesia Católica Apostólica Venezolana
- Classification: Western Christian
- Orientation: Independent Catholic
- Polity: Episcopal
- Patriarch: Guillermo Antonio Pacheco Bornacelli
- Region: Venezuela
- Founder: Luis Fernando Castillo Mendez
- Origin: 8 March 1947; Caracas, Venezuela
- Separated from: Catholic Church

The Venezuelan Catholic Apostolic Church (ICAV - Iglesia Católica Apostólica Venezolana) was a short-lived politically inspired Independent Catholic church in Venezuela. It was revived in the twenty-first century after a hiatus of over fifty years and is currently led by Guillermo Pacheco Bornacelli, who serves as Apostolic Administrator of the Apostolic Vicariate of San Juan Bautista.

The church was initially created in 1947 by Luis Fernando Castillo Mendez and three church members. Castillo Mendez had previously been expelled from Roman Catholic seminary after only one term and jailed for impersonating a priest. He was never recognized as a Roman Catholic priest. The new church adopted pearl-gray clerical dress in contrast to the Catholic Church's black, made Spanish the liturgical language instead of Latin, and permitted its clergy to marry; this resulted in formal excommunications of the highest degree. The ICAV secured political backing by supporting the anti-Catholic agenda of the Democratic Action and Communist parties in Venezuela, and subsequently began to dissolve with the collapse of the 'Adeco' government.
