= Edward Jarvis (author) =

British author of religious history, politics and theology

Doctor Edward Jarvis FRAS FRHistS
- Born: Kingston upon Hull, England

Academic background
- Education: Leeds Trinity University, Logos Institute, York St John University

Academic work
- Discipline: Interdisciplinary Humanities including History of Colonialism, History of Religions, and Global Christianity

Edward Jarvis FRAS FRHistS (born 1975) is a British author of religious history and political theology and sometime cleric. His books address previously underresearched topics such as the Independent Sacramental Movement, Sedevacantism, and the colonial-era introduction of Christianity in Southeast Asia, specifically in Vietnam, Myanmar (Burma), Malaysia, and Singapore.

== Early life and education ==
Edward Jarvis was born in Kingston upon Hull, England, in 1975, to an English father and an Italian mother. His great-grandfather was the Italian film actor Umberto Sclanizza. Jarvis attended Malet Lambert School before studying at Trinity & All Saints College, Logos Institute, and York St John University (School of Humanities}.

== Work ==
Jarvis wrote the first biographies of Brazilian bishop Carlos Duarte Costa and the Vietnamese archbishop Ngô Đình Thục, brother of President Ngô Đình Diệm. He has contributed to periodicals of church and society interest. In 2021, 2022, and 2024 he produced three volumes on the history, theology, and sociology of the Anglican Churches in Southeast Asia.

== Honours ==
Jarvis was elected a Fellow of the Royal Asiatic Society (FRAS) in 2019. He was previously a Fellow of the Royal Anthropological Institute. In 2021 he was elected a Fellow of the Royal Historical Society (FRHistS).

== Selected bibliography ==
- Jarvis, Edward (2018). God, Land & Freedom: The True Story of ICAB. Berkeley CA: The Apocryphile Press. ISBN 9781947826908.
- Jarvis, Edward (2018). Sede Vacante: The Life and Legacy of Archbishop Thuc. Berkeley CA: The Apocryphile Press. ISBN 9781949643022.
- Jarvis, Edward (2019). Carlos Duarte Costa: Testament of a Socialist Bishop. Berkeley CA: The Apocryphile Press. ISBN 9781949643237.
- Jarvis, Edward (2021). The Anglican Church in Burma: From Colonial Past to Global Future. University Park PA: Penn State University Press. ISBN 9780271091563.
- Jarvis, Edward (2022). The Anglican Church in Malaysia: Evolving Concepts, Challenging Contexts, Emerging Subtexts. London: Palgrave Macmillan. ISBN 9783031115967.
- Jarvis, Edward (2023). Divided over Hitler: The Rise and Ruin of the Aristocratic Schulenburg Family. Jefferson, North Carolina: McFarland. ISBN 9781476691893.
- Jarvis, Edward (2024). The Anglican Church in Singapore: Mission and Multiculture, Renewal and Realignment. Lanham, Maryland: Lexington Books/Fortress Academic. ISBN 9781978716988.
- Jarvis, Edward (2026). Sedevacantism: A Theological Challenge for the Catholic Church. United States of America. ISBN 9798242621800.
