= Logos Institute of Theology =

Higher education institution in Brazil

Coordinates: 5.50°S 45.24°W

The Logos Institute of Theology (Portuguese: Instituto de Teologia Logos) is an independent, private, non-denominational institution of higher education in Barra do Corda, Maranhão State (MA), in northeast Brazil. It is one of a significant number of Evangelical Christian educational institutions in Brazil offering theological qualifications primarily by distance learning. The institute offers online courses ranging from foundation, bachelors, masters, to doctoral degrees.

== History and accreditation ==
The Logos Institute of Theology was founded in 2007 and is currently led by its director, Netanias dos Santos Souza. Its qualifications are recognised under Brazilian law as "free" (exempt) courses (or cursos livres in Portuguese) not requiring specific recognition by the MEC (Ministério da Educação), the Brazilian Ministry of Education, in common with a large number of similar institutions. The laws regulating cursos livres apply to a wide range of vocational and distance learning courses. Examples include courses for languages, security, and IT. In the case of courses designated for the exercise of religious ministry and religious education the exempt qualifications are defined by the legal term interna corporis, or for 'in-house' use within a social entity, such as a church or seminary.
