= Luigi Mascolo =

Italian bishop (born 1927)

- Bishop of ICAB
- Church: Brazilian Catholic Apostolic Church
- Archdiocese: Rio de Janeiro

Orders
- Consecration: 5 April 1964 by Antidio Jose Vargas
- Rank: Bishop

Personal details
- Born: 7 January 1927 Irsina, Kingdom of Italy
- Denomination: Independent Catholicism, former Roman Catholic
- Profession: Priest, missionary

Luigi Mascolo (born 7 January 1927) was an Italian former Catholic priest who converted to and became a bishop of the Brazilian Catholic Apostolic Church (ICAB), an independent Catholic Church in Brazil.

== Biography ==
Mascolo was born in Irsina, Italy, in January 1927. After narrowly escaping deportation to a Nazi forced labor camp during World War II, he studied in Rome and was later ordained a priest of the Diocese of Matera-Irsina in 1957, before being sent to Brazil as a Fidei Donum missionary. Struggling to find his niche in Brazil, he converted to the Brazilian Catholic Apostolic Church and was consecrated as an ICAB bishop in 1964 by Antidio Jose Vargas, becoming ICAB's bishop in Rio de Janeiro and later national leader of ICAB during the 1970s (among other acts he consecrated the first bishop and Patriarch of the Argentine Catholic Apostolic Church, Leonardo Morizio Dominguez, in 1972). According to Roman Catholic Canon Law his actions against the Catholic Church resulted in automatic excommunication by the Vatican.
