= Salomão Barbosa Ferraz =

Brazilian catholic bishop

The Most Reverend Salomão Barbosa Ferraz
- Titular Bishop of Eleutherna; Auxiliary Bishop of São Paulo

Orders
- Ordination: July 18, 1945
- Consecration: August 15, 1945

Personal details
- Born: February 18, 1880 Jaú, Brazil
- Died: May 9, 1969 (aged 89) São Paulo, Brazil
- Denomination: Roman Catholicism prev. Anglicanism; Brazilian Catholic Apostolic Church; Free Catholic Church
- Spouse: Emilia Cagnoto

Salomão Barbosa Ferraz (18 February 1880 – 09 May 1969) was a Brazilian Roman Catholic priest and bishop whose career took him through membership of several Christian denominations from Presbyterianism to the Roman Catholic Church.

== Biography ==
Ferraz was born in Jaú, Brazil on February 18, 1880. Originally a Presbyterian minister, Barbosa Ferraz was ordained an Anglican priest in 1917. He founded an ecumenical society, the "Order of Saint Andrew", in 1928, and was instrumental in organising a 'Free Catholic Congress' in 1936.

At the close of this event he established a "Free Catholic Church" and was elected as the church's first bishop. The Second World War halted his plans to be consecrated bishop by European Old Catholics, but Salomão Barbosa Ferraz was eventually consecrated by Carlos Duarte Costa following this bishop's excommunication by the Vatican in 1945. Barbosa Ferraz was also a member of Freemasonry.

Salomão Barbosa Ferraz in turn consecrated Manoel Ceia Laranjeira for the Free Catholic Church of Brazil in 1951, but sought reception into the Roman Catholic Church, which he achieved under Pope John XXIII, leaving Manoel Ceia Laranjeira at the head of the Free Catholic Church, then renamed the Independent Catholic Apostolic Church in Brazil.

In 1959, Ferraz was received into the Roman Catholic Church. His reception met with some resistance and confusion in Rome, where it had been assumed that he was widowed or chaste. He was eventually named titular bishop of Eleutherna in 1963 and took part in the Second Vatican Council. Bishop Ferraz died in 1969, leaving a wife and seven children.

Ferraz was a rare example of a legally accepted married bishop in the modern Roman Catholic history.
