= Worldwide Communion of Catholic Apostolic Churches =

- Comunión de Iglesias Católicas Apostólicas Mundiales
- Abbreviation: WCCAC, CICAM
- Classification: Western Christian
- Orientation: Independent Catholic
- Polity: Episcopal

The Worldwide Communion of Catholic Apostolic Churches (WCCAC; Spanish: Comunión de Iglesias Católicas Apostólicas Mundiales, CICAM) was a communion of Independent Catholic churches connected to the Brazilian Catholic Apostolic Church (ICAB). The Worldwide Communion of Catholic Apostolic Churches was founded around 2008 in Guatemala. In spite of its ambitious aims, there is no independent evidence of any recent activity of this organization, which seems to have stalled.

== Organization and beliefs ==
The Worldwide Communion of Catholic Apostolic Churches stated its adherence to conventional Catholic Christian doctrine, though with openness to other beliefs that they perceive do not contradict the Catholic faith. Similarly, the WCCAC understanding of church structure and hierarchy, sacraments, and holy orders essentially did not differ from conventional Catholicism, but dissolution of marriage by a bishop was allowed. The founding bishops' statement added: "We do not accept any ordination of women into the Holy Orders [...]. We do not allow any homosexual clergy in any communion churches." Member churches were formed in different countries, presided over by bishops, including the Mexican Catholic Apostolic Church in Mexico, among others.

== Inactivity ==
There is no independently verifiable evidence of significant activity of WCCAC in recent years, and it could be presumed to have terminated: "ICAB [WCCAC's mother church] has had difficulty in maintaining the unity and continuity of its worldwide communion of branches. (...) [The] priorities of each branch do not always seem to be in harmony (...) and it becomes difficult at times to see what the point of having an international communion is supposed to be. In ICAB’s defense, perhaps, it cannot be easy to hold breakaway groups in a communion, however loose a communion it may be – it is almost a direct contradiction in terms."
