= Carlos Duarte Costa =

Brazilian Catholic bishop (1888–1961)

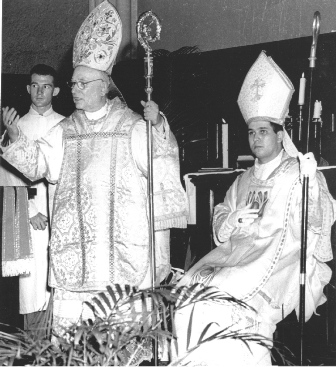
- Duarte Costa (left) with Luis Fernando Castillo Mendez (right) during the episcopal consecration in Panama
- Church: Brazilian Catholic Apostolic Church
- Diocese: Rio de Janeiro
- See: Rio de Janeiro
- Installed: 5 July 1945
- Term ended: 26 March 1961
- Predecessor: Position created
- Successor: Luis Fernando Castillo Mendez
- Previous posts: Bishop of Botucatu (1924–1937); Titular Bishop of Maura (1937–1945); Bishop of Rio de Janeiro (1945–1961)

Orders
- Ordination: 4 May 1911 by Joaquim Arcoverde de Albuquerque Cavalcanti
- Consecration: 8 December 1924 by Sebastião da Silveira Cintra
- Rank: Considered as Patriarch (title not used during his lifetime) (Brazilian Catholic Apostolic) / Bishop - (Catholic)

Personal details
- Born: Carlos Duarte Costa; July 21, 1888 Rio de Janeiro, Empire of Brazil
- Died: March 26, 1961 (aged 72) Rio de Janeiro, Second Brazilian Republic
- Denomination: Brazilian Catholic Apostolic Church (formerly Roman Catholic)
- Motto: O Senhor é a Minha Luz ('The Lord is my Light'); Charitas Christi Urget Nos ('The Love of Christ Compels Us')
- Coat of arms: Carlos Duarte Costa's coat of arms

Sainthood
- Title as Saint: São Carlos do Brasil
- Canonized: by Brazilian Catholic Apostolic Church

Styles of Carlos Duarte Costa
- Religious style: Bishop
- Posthumous style: Saint

Ordination history of Carlos Duarte Costa
History
Priestly ordination
- Date: 4 May 1911
- Place: Uberaba, Brazil
Episcopal consecration
- Principal consecrator: Sebastião da Silveira Cintra
- Co-consecrators: Alberto José Gonçalves; Benedito Paulo Alves de Souza
- Date: 8 December 1924
- Place: Rio de Janeiro, Brazil
Episcopal succession
Bishops consecrated by Carlos Duarte Costa as principal consecrator
- Salomão Barbosa Ferraz: 15 August 1945
- Antidio Jose Vargas: 8 December 1946
- Luis Fernando Castillo Mendez: 3 May 1948
- Milton Cunha: 5 June 1960
- Pedro dos Santos Silva: 4 November 1956
- Orlando Acre Moya: 30 November 1956

Carlos Duarte Costa (July 21, 1888 – March 26, 1961) was a Brazilian bishop and Christian communist who became the founder of the Brazilian Catholic Apostolic Church, an Independent Catholic church, and its international communion, which long after his death became the short-lived Worldwide Communion of Catholic Apostolic Churches.

The former Catholic Bishop of Botucatu, he was excommunicated by Pope Pius XII, ultimately for schism, but in culmination of several political, doctrinal and canonical issues (such as his views on clerical celibacy). Duarte Costa has been canonized as "St. Carlos of Brazil" by the Brazilian Catholic Apostolic Church.

== Biography ==
=== Early life and ministry ===
Carlos Duarte Costa was born in Rio de Janeiro on July 21, 1888, at the residence of his uncle Eduardo Duarte de Silva. His father was João Matta Francisco Costa and his mother was Maria Carlota Duarte da Silva Costa, who came from a family heavily involved in politics and public service. He completed his primary studies at the Salesian College Santa Rosa, in Niterói, and at age nine, he received his first communion in the cathedral of Uberaba from the hands of his uncle, Dom Eduardo Duarte da Silva (now a bishop), on July 24, 1897. That same year he was taken by his uncle to Rome to study at the Pontifical Latin American College, a Jesuit minor seminary. In 1905 he returned to Brazil for health reasons and entered an Augustinian seminary in Uberaba, where he continued his philosophical and theological studies. He only narrowly managed to complete his studies and qualify for ordination, however, and his uncle intervened to vouch for his nephew.

After ordination as a deacon, Duarte Costa served in the cathedral church of Uberaba under his uncle, Dom Eduardo Duarte da Silva, who, on April 1, 1911, ordained Duarte Costa to the priesthood.

On July 4, 1924, Pope Pius XI nominated Duarte Costa as Bishop of Botucatu.

=== Attempts at church and societal reform ===
In 1932, Duarte Costa played an active role in the Constitutionalist Revolution, a failed attempt to restore constitutional government to Brazil. Duarte Costa formed a "Battalion of the Bishop" to fight on the side of the Constitutionalist troops and helped finance the battalion by selling off diocesan assets along with his own personal possessions. Duarte Costa's battalion never fought, however, which was a source of disappointment to him.

In 1936, Duarte Costa made his second ad limina visit to Rome, meeting with Pope Pius XI. It is widely believed that he presented the pope with a list of radical reform proposals for the Catholic Church in Brazil, though no record of this survives. During this period he did become friends with another outspoken priest who would go on to achieve world fame, Helder Camara.

=== Bishop of Maura ===
In September 1937, Duarte Costa resigned from his episcopal post and was appointed titular bishop of Maura.

In 1944 he gained further notoriety by writing a glowing preface to the Brazilian translation of The Soviet Power by the Very Reverend Hewlett Johnson, the Anglican Dean of Canterbury known as "The Red Dean" for his uncompromising support of Joseph Stalin and the Soviet Union. Duarte Costa consistently maintained his left-wing allegiance, calling for the establishment of a "Christian communism" in contrast to "Roman [Catholic] Church Fascism".

As long as he enjoyed the protection of Cardinal Dom Sebastiao Leme da Silveira Cintra, Duarte Costa's political activism proceeded without much trouble. However, soon after the cardinal's death, Duarte Costa was formally accused by the Brazilian government of being a communist sympathizer. He was arrested on June 6, 1944, and imprisoned in Belo Horizonte.

=== Excommunication ===
After his release from prison Carlos Duarte Costa soon found himself in trouble again. In May 1945, Duarte Costa gave newspaper interviews accusing Brazil's papal nuncio of Nazi-Fascist spying, and accused Rome of having aided and abetted Adolf Hitler. In addition, he announced plans to set up his own Brazilian Catholic Apostolic Church, in which priests would be permitted to marry (and hold regular jobs in the lay world), personal confessions and the praying of rosaries would be abolished and bishops would be elected by popular vote.

In response to Duarte Costa's continued insubordination, the Vatican finally laid against him the penalty of excommunication on July 2, 1945. Upon being informed of his excommunication, Duarte Costa responded by saying, "I consider today one of the happiest days of my life." He immediately titled himself "Archbishop of Rio de Janeiro" and told the press that he hoped soon to ordain ten married lawyers and professional men as priests in his new church.

=== Founding of the ICAB ===
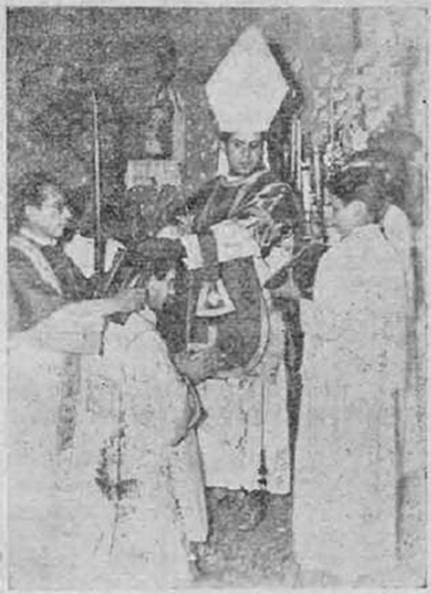
Duarte Costa consecrates Castillo Mendez in 1948

After establishing the Igreja Católica Apostólica Brasileira (ICAB), Duarte Costa continued to use the same vestments, insignia, and rites as he had in the Roman Catholic Church. This provoked the cardinals of São Paulo and Rio de Janeiro to appeal to the Minister of Justice and the President himself for an injunction against both him and the ICAB. On September 27, 1948, the ICAB churches were closed by the courts, on the grounds that they were deceiving the public into thinking they were Catholic churches and clergy. Duarte Costa quickly filed an appeal, and in 1949 the Brazilian Supreme Court ruled that the ICAB could reopen its doors on condition that the church use a modified liturgy and its clergy wear gray cassocks to minimize the potential for confusion with the black-colored Roman Catholic clergy. The ICAB attracted the attention of scholars of Brazilian religions such as Roger Bastide, who described it as "having both a religious and a political program, the latter [having] much in common with the Communist Party".

Unlike the official Catholic Church in Brazil, the ICAB developed friendly relations with Spiritism and Freemasonry. Duarte Costa "began giving talks in Spiritist centers to publicize the new church" and "ICAB would go on to attract many members" of Freemasonry. Duarte Costa also "openly encouraged cooperation with Umbanda, Macumba and Candomblé communities" when these are considered wholly incompatible with Roman Catholicism.

In the years immediately after founding the church, Duarte Costa consecrated four bishops, Salomão Barbosa Ferraz (August 15, 1945), Jorge Alves de Souza and Antidio Jose Vargas (both in 1946) and Luis Fernando Castillo Mendez (May 3, 1948); and Castillo Mendez was the youngest bishop consecrated by Duarte Costa, at the age of 25.

These bishops had intended to establish similar autonomous Catholic national churches in several other Latin American countries. Relations between the bishops were not always good, and Duarte Costa fought bitterly with Ferraz from the earliest days of the ICAB. His most fractious and quarrelsome relationship was with Castillo Mendez, whom he repeatedly denounced as a fraud and a charlatan. Duarte Costa consecrated eleven ICAB bishops in total.

Catholic Church titles
Preceded by Lúcio Antunes de Souza	Diocesan Bishop of Botucatu; 1924 – 1937	Succeeded by Antonio Colturato
Preceded by Vacant	Titular Bishop of Maura; 1937 - 1945	Succeeded by Cipriano Biyehima Kihangire
Brazilian Catholic Apostolic Church
Preceded by Position created	Patriarch of Brazilian Catholic Apostolic Church; 1945 – 1961	Succeeded by Luis Fernando Castillo Mendez
