= Brazilian Catholic Apostolic Church =

Independent Catholic Christian church

- Portuguese: Igreja Católica Apostólica Brasileira
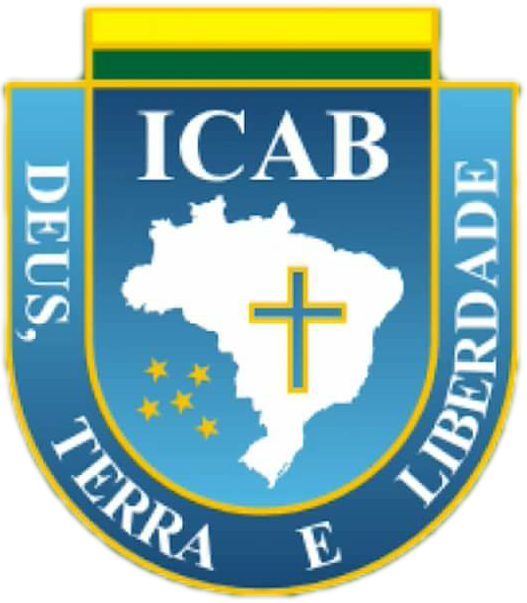
- Emblem of the Brazilian Catholic Apostolic Church with its motto "God, Land and Freedom" (Portuguese: Deus, Terra e Liberdade)
- Abbreviation: ICAB
- Classification: Western Christian
- Orientation: Independent Catholic
- Scripture: Catholic Bible
- Theology: Catholic theology, Christian socialism, Christian communism, Clerical marriage, Religious pluralism
- Polity: Episcopal
- Governance: Episcopal Council
- President: José Carlos Ferreira Lucas
- Dioceses: 24
- Associations: Worldwide Communion of Catholic Apostolic Churches
- Language: Brazilian Portuguese
- Headquarters: Brasília, Brazil
- Territory: Brazil, Bolivia, Ecuador, Philippines
- Founder: Carlos Duarte Costa
- Origin: 1945; Rio de Janeiro, Brazil
- Separated from: Catholic Church in Brazil
- Churches and chapels: 122
- Members: 560,781 as of 2010
- Official website: https://igrejacatolicabrasileira.org

The Brazilian Catholic Apostolic Church (Portuguese: Igreja Católica Apostólica Brasileira, pronounced [iˈɡɾeʒɐ kaˈtɔlikaposˈtɔlikɐ bɾaziˈlejɾɐ]; ICAB) is an Independent Catholic Christian church established in 1945 by excommunicated Brazilian Catholic bishop Carlos Duarte Costa. The Brazilian Catholic Apostolic Church is the largest Independent Catholic church in Brazil, with 560,781 members as of 2010, and 21 dioceses nationwide (including 1 in the Philippines and 1 each in Bolivia and Ecuador) as of 2026. The church is governed by a president bishop and an episcopal council. The church's administration is in Brasília, Brazil.

The Brazilian Catholic Apostolic Church was the mother church of an international communion called the Worldwide Communion of Catholic Apostolic Churches, though there is no evidence of any recent activity. It is also a primary source of many claims to apostolic succession and the historic episcopate throughout the independent sacramental movement.

== History ==
=== Background ===
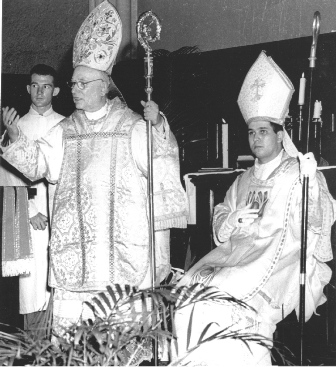
Costa during the episcopal consecration of Castillo Mendez

Carlos Duarte Costa was an outspoken critic of the regime of Brazilian president Getúlio Vargas (1930–1945) and of the Vatican's alleged relationship with fascist regimes. He also publicly criticized the dogma of papal infallibility and Catholic doctrines on divorce and clerical celibacy. As a result of his outspoken views, Costa resigned from his office of bishop of Botucatu in 1937 and was appointed to a titular see.

In 1940, Cardinal Sebastião da Silveira Cintra, archbishop of Rio de Janeiro, permitted Costa—as titular bishop of Maura—to co-consecrate Bishop Eliseu Maria Coroli. Costa continued to criticize the government and the Roman Catholic Church, advocating policies that were regarded by the authorities as Communist. In 1944, the federal Brazilian government imprisoned him, but later freed him under political pressure from the United States and Great Britain.

=== Establishment ===
In June 1945, Costa established the Brazilian Catholic Apostolic Church (ICAB). Costa's act of schism resulted in his automatic excommunication from the Catholic Church. (Note: Under the 1917 Code of Canon Law, which was in effect prior to 1983, only canonically culpable people are formally guilty of schism.) Later Costa was declared a vitandus—a person to be avoided by Catholics—and those Catholics who became adherents of the ICAB were excommunicated also. According to Peter Anson, Costa was excommunicated "for attacks against the papacy."

In 1949, the Brazilian government temporarily suppressed all public worship by the ICAB, because its liturgy and its clerical attire would result in confusion by being indistinguishable from those of the Catholic Church in Brazil and were tantamount to deception of the public. During the initial months of the Brazilian Catholic Apostolic Church, Costa consecrated Salomão Barbosa Ferraz of the Free Catholic Church.

=== Schisms and branches ===
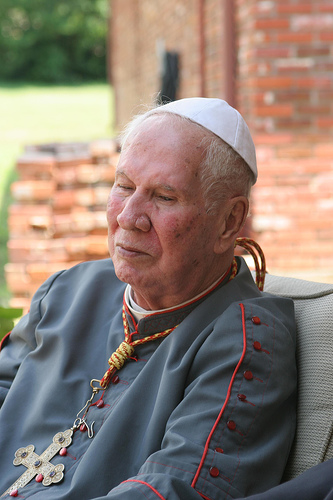
Luis Fernando Castillo Mendez, patriarch from 1988 to 2009

Ferraz would then leave the Brazilian Catholic Apostolic Church in 1958. Ferraz reconciled with the Catholic Church in 1959 and his episcopal consecration was recognized as valid. However, Ferraz was excluded from church affairs such as the Roman Synod of 1960, even though he was present in Rome at the time, while the Vatican belatedly questioned the legitimacy of having recognized his status.

Shortly thereafter, in 1961, Costa died and the ICAB underwent several years of tumult as dissensions, schisms, and multiple claimants to the throne threw the church into disarray. After this period, the church found stability and growth under Luis Fernando Castillo Mendez, who would be accepted as Costa's successor. (Note: José Aires da Cruz succeeded Costa, according to Anson.)

Some sources seem to indicate that Mendez assumed leadership of the ICAB upon Costa's death in 1961. Bishop Antidio Jose Vargas initially stepped in as general supervisor, followed by Pedro dos Santos Silva as first president of the Episcopal Council, followed by the Italian-born Luigi Mascolo during the 1970s.

By 1982 Castillo Mendez was elected president of the Episcopal Council, and was designated as patriarch of the ICAB in 1988 and as patriarch of Iglesias Católicas Apostólicas Nacionales (ICAN), the international communion of similar churches in 1990 which would become the Worldwide Communion of Catholic Apostolic Churches.

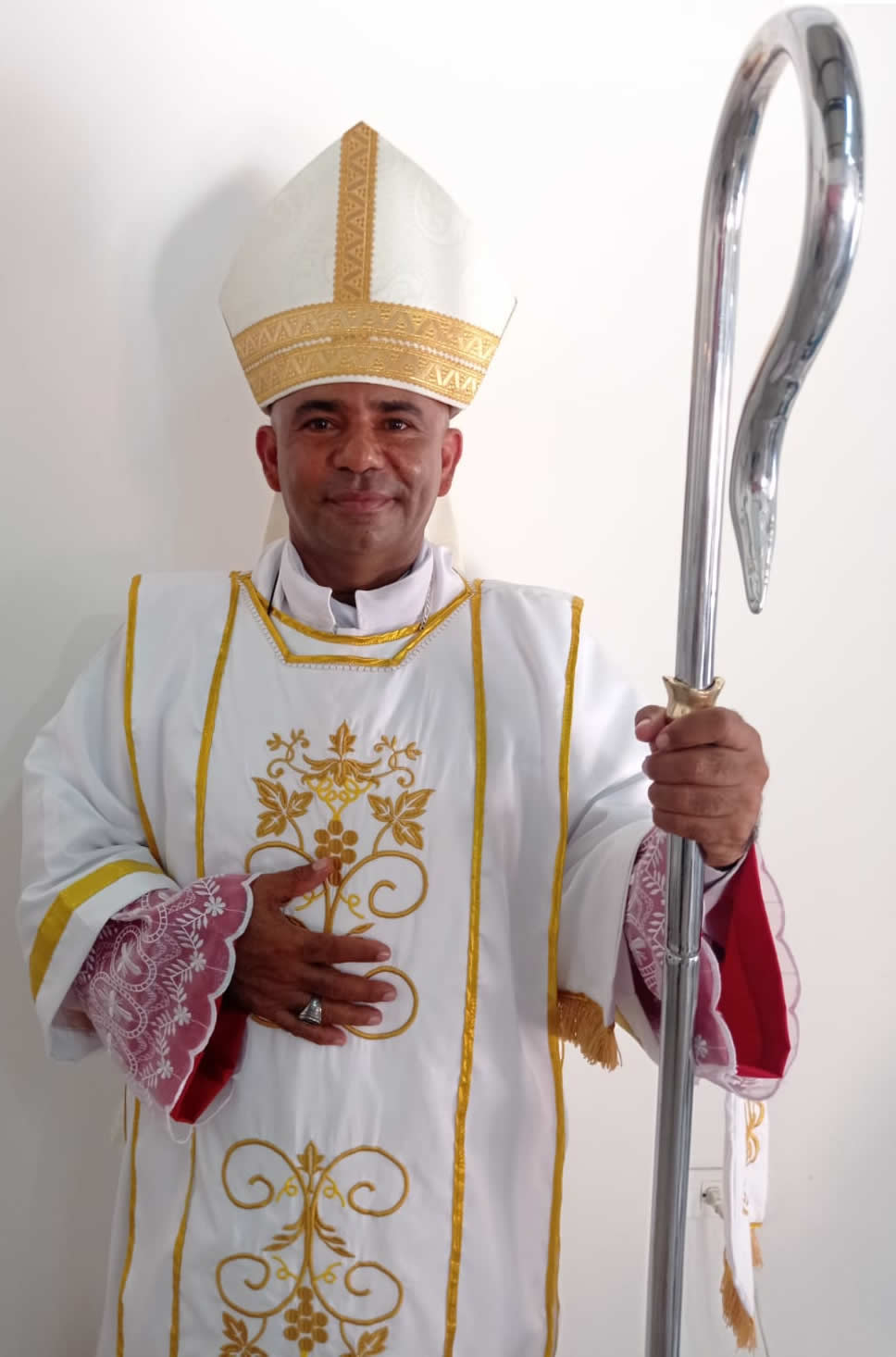
Anderson Said Arzuaga Padilla, the first bishop over Barranquilla, Colombia

Under Castillo Mendez, the ICAB created the Canadian Catholic Apostolic Church in 1988, ordaining Claude R. Baron as the first Canadian bishop. In 1997, Mendez agreed to intercommunion between the Brazilian Catholic Apostolic Church and the International Communion of the Charismatic Episcopal Church (ICCEC). (Note: Mendez and two other ICAB bishops reconsecrated five ICCEC bishops in 1997; those five reconsecrated bishops reordained all ICCEC's clergy and reconsecrated all its bishops.)

The year 1997 also saw the ordination of the first 'ICAB succession' bishop in the United Kingdom, namely John Christopher Simmons of Ashford, Kent. Simmons (1945-2003) was part of a small house church which fronted a prolific and well-documented ring of pedophilia and child exploitation, brought to light in multiple highly-publicised cases involving Roger Gleaves and Frederick Gilbert Linale.

Both Gleaves and Linale received lengthy sentences; Simmons stood in as head of the church in their absence. The British branch of ICAB still exists, though currently in no formal relationship with the ICAB, and it has changed name several times since Simmons' tenure. The leader successive of this branch, now called the Catholic Church of England & Wales, was James Atkinson-Wake, also known as David Bell.

In 2016, the former Speaker of the Australian House of Representatives, Peter Slipper—previously a priest in the Anglican Catholic Church in Australia—flew to Brazil to be ordained to the priesthood in the ICAB.

The following year he was consecrated to the episcopate in Rio de Janeiro. He became the bishop in Australia of the Catholic Apostolic Church in Australia (ICAB) and visited a Greek Orthodox church under this title.

There has been no independently verifiable evidence of significant activity of the Worldwide Communion of Catholic Apostolic Churches since the mid-2010s, and it could be presumed to have terminated. According to Edward Jarvis, the "ICAB has had difficulty in maintaining the unity and continuity of its worldwide communion (...). [The] priorities of each branch do not always seem to be in harmony ... and it becomes difficult at times to see what the point of having an international communion is supposed to be. In ICAB’s defense, perhaps, it cannot be easy to hold breakaway groups in a communion, however loose a communion it may be – it is almost a direct contradiction in terms."

=== Restructuring ===
After the inactivity of the Worldwide Communion of Catholic Apostolic Churches, the Brazilian Catholic Apostolic Church restructured its dioceses; and as of August 2026, only the churches and clergy ordained and affiliated in Bolivia, Ecuador, and the Philippines were recognized as international members of ICAB.

== Doctrine ==
=== Theology ===
The Brazilian Catholic Apostolic Church accepts the Nicene and Apostles' creeds. It observes seven sacraments (baptism, Eucharist, confirmation, penance, unction, matrimony and ordination) in common with the Catholic Church in Brazil. The church acknowledges divorce as a reality of life and will marry divorced persons after an ecclesiastical process of investigation and baptize the children of divorced persons. In the Brazilian Catholic Apostolic Church, papal infallibility and priestly celibacy are rejected. Clergy are also allowed to have secular employment and priestly confession is rejected.

Within the Brazilian Catholic Apostolic Church, Costa deliberately promoted diversity of theological opinion on several matters, and ICAB endorsed religious pluralism for those seeking to become a part of the Independent Catholic movement. In God Land & Freedom, The True Story of ICAB, Edward Jarvis noted:

He [Costa] became captivated with the idea of a Church that would be a more authentic expression of people's faith, in harmony with the Afro-Brazilian religions, Freemasonry, the Occult, and Protestantism, with which he saw no incompatibility either in principle or in practice. ICAB would be true to what Brazilians believed, whereas Romanization could only ever achieve a veneer of external rites, appealing mainly to the comfortably-off. Duarte Costa foresaw a more authentically catholic—universal—Christian religion; perhaps only broadly Christian, but as Brazilian people really believed and practised it, and in this sense a National Catholic Church.

Jarvis also stated that: "A later bishop would consider himself, and his wife and family, still Jewish after joining the ICAB clergy." He noted that people of any religious conviction were welcomed.

=== Apostolic succession ===
The church holds that apostolic succession is maintained through the consecration of its bishops in an unbroken succession back to the apostles of Christ. All ICAB bishops trace their apostolic succession back to Carlos Duarte Costa, a former bishop of the Catholic Church in Brazil. It is widely believed that the ICAB's consecrations follow the Roman Catholic Tridentine rite in a vernacular version of the Roman Pontifical, but this is not certain: the ICAB's rites were altered on several occasions, and uniformity in practice has never been enforced anyway; furthermore, the Tridentine rite in an unauthorized vernacular form would no longer be considered Tridentine according to Roman Catholic theology.

The church cites the unique case of Ferraz as evidence that its apostolic succession is valid, even by Roman Catholic standards. Just over a month after the church's foundation, in 1945, Duarte Costa consecrated Ferraz as bishop. Around fifteen years later during the pontificate of Pope John XXIII, Ferraz was reconciled with the Roman Catholic Church and was eventually recognized as a bishop, even though he was married at the time. Ferraz was not ordained or consecrated again, even conditionally; however he was initially held at arm's length by the Vatican while they examined his case, somewhat belatedly, and mooted the possibility of an affidavit to affirm that Ferraz, aged 80, and his Italian wife were chaste. He did pastoral work in the Roman Catholic Archdiocese of São Paulo until May 12, 1963, when he was appointed titular bishop of Eleutherna by Pope John XXIII. Ferraz participated in all four sessions of the Second Vatican Council, and Pope Paul VI appointed him to serve on one of Vatican II's working commissions. Upon his death in 1969, Ferraz was buried with full honors accorded a bishop of the Catholic Church. Being a rare example of a married bishop in modern Roman Catholic history, he was survived by seven children. Since then, however, the Vatican has repeatedly expressed reservations about the ICAB's sacraments and does not recognize them; in 2012 Rome declared the ICAB schismatic and reaffirmed its negation of the ICAB's valid but "illicit" orders.
