= Antiochian Western Rite Vicariate =

Vicariate of the Antiochian Orthodox Christian Archdiocese of North America

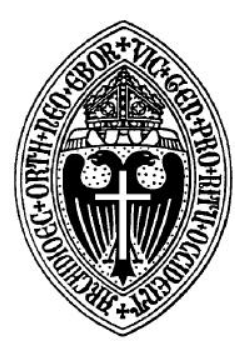
- Abbreviation: AWRV
- Type: Vicariate
- Classification: Eastern Orthodox
- Archbishop: Metropolitan Saba Esper
- Episcopal Vicar: Bishop John Abdalah
- Assistant: John Fenton
- Vicar Emeritus: Edward Hughes
- Monasteries: 1
- Parishes: 30
- Language: Latin, English, Spanish
- Liturgy: Roman, Anglican
- Territory: United States & Canada
- Founder: Patriarch Alexander III, Metropolitan Anthony Bashir, Fr. Alexander Turner
- Origin: 1958 (Formally); 1961 (first parishes received)
- Members: ~10,000
- Official website: Official Dashboard; The Orthodox West

The Western Rite Vicariate of the Antiochian Orthodox Christian Archdiocese of North America, commonly called the Antiochian Western Rite Vicariate (AWRV) or simply the Western Rite Vicariate (WRV), is a vicariate of Western Orthodox Christian communities throughout the United States of America and Canada. It is the largest Western Orthodox jurisdiction in full communion with the entire Eastern Orthodox Church.

Formally established in 1958 by Metropolitan Anthony Bashir through an edict issued at the Archdiocese's General Convention in Los Angeles, the vicariate was established "To provide a home in the Orthodox Church for western people of non-Byzantine cultural and religious background," and "To witness to the catholicity of the Orthodox Church to her Byzantine Rite people, priests and theologians."

The AWRV numbers several thousand communicants in 30 parishes and missions, and one monastery. Administratively, the vicariate is structured into four deaneries covering the United States of America and Canada, with full oversight by an episcopal vicar (currently Bishop John of Worcester and New England), and the Archdiocese's Metropolitan (currently Saba Esber).

Since the reception of its inaugural parishes and clergy in 1961, the Vicariate experienced steady growth in the late 20th centuries through the reception of communities from Old Catholic and Continuing Anglican churches, and the Episcopal Church. Since its founding, the Vicariate expanding from three initial communities in the early 1960s to 24 parishes and missions by 2003.Recent reports as of 2025 highlight continued "explosive growth" in existing parishes, with strategic plans to establish nine additional missions and achieve 30 full parishes (not including missions) within five years.

== History ==
=== Earlier proposals ===
Prior to the establishment of the Western Rite Vicariate in 1958, several groups had approached the Greek Orthodox Patriarchate of Antioch to be received as Western Orthodox.

On August 5th, 1911, Archbishop Arnold Harris Mathew and the Old Roman Catholic Church in Great Britain entered into an Act of Union with the Patriarchate of Antioch, and Abp. Mathew swore an oath of fidelity to Patriarch Gregory IV as confirmed by Gerassimos Messara, Prince-Archbishop and Metropolitan of the Orthodox Church of Beirut. However, Prince-Archbishop Messara had no power to do this without the consent of Patriarch Gregory IV, which was never given" Patriarch Gregory IV retracted Messara's statement. (Note: "none". The Guardian. London. 12 April 1912. OCLC 21987594. and "none". The Guardian. London. 19 April 1912. OCLC 21987594. cited by Herzog.) On 26 February 1912, Greek Orthodox Church of Alexandria Patriarch Photius of Alexandria, however, did accept this union. Although Mathew was originally informed that "all were welcome", he was not ultimately admitted as a cleric into the Church of Antioch. As Fr. Nicholas Alford notes:

Some have claimed that Metropolitan Gerassimos gave approval to the Missal and Ritual used by Mathew, but as with the union, the terms of acceptance and what changes were needed were not clarified. The most significant effect of this episode was the lasting effect it had on a young Deacon Anthony Bashir, who accompanied Metropolitan Gerrassimos, as it was Metropolitan Anthony Bashir who gave a canonical home to the Western Rite movement in America forty-seven years later.

Metropolitan Germanos (Shehadi), while resident in the United States, engaged in negotiations to receive a Roman Catholic movement in Mexico in the 1920's, but the group was ultimately not received. Metropolitan Anthony Bashir was approached by multiple groups in the 1950's, as noted in his report to the 1958 Convention of the Syrian Orthodox Christian Archdiocese of New York:

I have rejected many overtures from persons and sects of uncertain composition and purpose. Some eight years ago a number of former Roman Catholic priests and parishes in Central America sought admission to our Patriarchate with their Latin rite. My delegate reported unfavorably and the application was refused. Subsequently the movement took a course which fully justified my refusal. No one can avoid every failure, but in this delicate situation, so new to us, every precaution is necessary.

=== Society of Saint Basil ===
Fr. Alexander Turner of the Society of Clerks Secular of St. Basil celebrating Mass.

Sometime in 1930 or 1931, William Albert Nichols, a priest of the Apostolic Christian Church, converted to Orthodoxy and joined the American Orthodox Catholic Church, led by Archbishop Aftimios Olfiesh. In 1931, the Society of Clerks Secular of Saint Basil was founded by Nichols and Olfiesh. On September 27, 1932, Nichols was consecrated Auxiliary Bishop of Washington by Abp. Aftimios, with the name Ignatius, to evangelise Americans in the English language using a western rite. This was part of Olfiesh's plan to lay the foundation of the AOCC which would transcend nationality and language. Eventually by 1934, Olfiesh’s group, including Bishop Ignatius Nichols, would find itself outside mainstream Orthodoxy in "canonical limbo".

Nichols' successor as head of the SSB was Alexander Turner. Turner was given leadership of the SSB in 1936 and consecrated as bishop by Nichols in 1939. Bishop Nichols reposed in 1947, leaving Turner as the sole leader of the AOCC and SSB. Turner would eventually come to the conclusion that there was no future for his little flock outside canonical Orthodoxy, and through his friend Fr. Paul Schneirla began unofficial conversations in 1952 on canonical regularisation by Metropolitan Anthony Bashir in the Syrian Antiochian Archdiocese of New York. Turner had been promoting the Western Rite Orthodox ideal for decades before this, and expressing his ideas through his periodical The Basilian, later renamed Orthodoxy.

=== Creation of the Vicariate ===
Metropolitan Anthony Bashir

As Schneirla recalls,

In desiring to extend and implement Orthodoxy’s mission in America, Metropolitan Antony realized that there were also those outside of communion with the Church who were sincerely seeking the truth, who were desirous of becoming engrafted to the vine of Christ. After considerable meditation of the problem and taking into consideration the action of the Church elsewhere in the world, namely France, he came to the conclusion that the use of a Western rite in America could be of importance in facilitating the return to the Church of separated Western Christians in America. He turned for guidance to the late Patriarch Alexander III of Antioch who, in May, 1958, after consultation with the other Autocephalous Churches, gave an affirmative reply. Forwarding to the Metropolitan an Arabic translation of the famous 1936 Ukase of the Moscow Patriarchate, the Patriarch of Antioch authorized Metropolitan Antony to "take the same action, leaving to your Orthodox zeal and good judgment the right to work out the details in the local situations."

On May 31, 1958, Patriarch Alexander III of Antioch authorised His Eminence Metropolitan Anthony Bashir of New York to establish Western Orthodoxy in the Syrian Orthodox Christian Archdiocese of New York. In August of that year, Metropolitan Anthony issued his edict establishing the Western Rite Vicariate in the archdiocese. The parishes of the SSB were quietly placed under probationary supervision for the next several years. By Easter, 1961, everything was prepared. The three remaining parishes under Bp. Alexander's supervision, and all the remaining Basilians, by this time only nine professed members, were received into the Antiochian Archdiocese of New York during Holy Week. The clergy were ordained as priests and Turner himself was given the rank of mitred archpriest and named the first Vicar General of the newly-established Western Rite Vicariate.

=== Expansion ===
In 1967, Bishop Maurice Francis Parkin of a splinter group of the North American Old Roman Catholic Church under Richard Arthur Marchenna, and St. Luke's Priory, along with three of his clergy and the parish of St. Anne in Mount Holly, New Jersey were received by chrismation into the Western Rite Vicariate. The monks of St. Luke's Priory ran St. Luke's Priory Press, and after St. Luke’s reception into the AWRV, the monks would provide all of the publications for the AWRV. The priory was formally disestablished in the 1980's some time after Parkin's death, but the press remains in use by the Vicariate.

Church of the Incarnation, Detroit, Michigan

New avenues for growth opened in 1976 with the reception of Church of the Incarnation in Detroit, Michigan. Incarnation was a parish of the Episcopal Church before its reception by the Antiochian Archdiocese in 1976, amid the recent turmoil that had overtaken the PECUSA. Incarnation was one of only a few former Episcopal churches that joined the AWRV, but it left a massive impact on the Vicariate. Fr. Joseph Angwin, the parish priest (described as an "extreme ritualist") petitioned for the use of the Book of Common Prayer, as revised by his parish, as their liturgical rite instead of the Tridentine Use which had been used by all AWRV parishes thitherto that point. Metropolitan Philip gave tentative approval to the liturgy, and work began revising the liturgy according to the standards prescribed by the Russian Observations upon the American Prayer Book. This liturgy, initially entitled The Divine Liturgy: Western Rite, is what ultimately became the Mass of Saint Tikhon. The same period also saw growing ecumenical dialogue between the Polish National Catholic Church and the Antiochian Archdiocese. Even as late as 1994 there were hopes for a possible union between the PNCC and the Antiochian Archdiocese, but no union ever materialised.

In 1979, St. Andrew’s Church in Eustis, Florida was received into the AWRV, along with several other parishes from the Episcopal Church.The priest of Saint Andrew’s, Fr. Michael Keiser, began developing a parish prayer book to codify the liturgical materials provided by the Vicariate. Several years later, a paperback version of what would become the Saint Andrew's Service Book was printed by the parish and was quickly picked up by a number of other churches. The appearance of a full liturgical service book would help to stabilise the liturgical life of the movement, and eventually the AWRV would reissue several liturgical books in the years leading up to the publication of The Orthodox Missal in 1995.

In 1991, Fr. John Connely, rector of St. Mark's Episcopal Parish in Denver, Colorado—which had recently lost its historic building to the Episcopal Diocese of Denver, once visited by St. Tikhon of Moscow—came in contact with the Antiochian Archdiocese, and the community was subsequently received into the Western Rite Vicariate. The parish runs Lancelot Andrewes Press, a well-known producer of Anglican Rite liturgical texts, most notably the St. Dunstan Plainsong Psalter.

The Benedictine Fellowship of St. Laurence at St. Mark’s bought a mountain property near Cañon City, Colorado, in 2001 intended as a retreat center and outgrowth of the parish. The property had one large lodge on the site, where the church began offering retreats in 2001. The Benedictine Fellowship constructed an oratory in 2009. The monastic community of Our Lady of Glastonbury and Saint Laurence (now commonly known as Ladyminster) was officially established on Roodmas (September 14), 2013. Ladyminster has grown to become the cornerstone of the Orthodox Order of Saint Benedict, particularly through its oblates.

=== The Vicariate today ===
Since its founding in 1958, the Western Rite Vicariate has increased more than tenfold in size, and now consists of "a rapidly growing dimension of the Church's mission in America," boasting 30 parishes and missions as of 2026. The Vicariate holds a bi-annual conference, hosted by various parishes, typically around the Solemnity of the Transfiguration.

In 2024, following that year's bi-annual conference, the position of Vicar General was abolished by Metropolitan Saba and replaced with the position of Assistant for the Western Rite, with greater oversight given to the Episcopal Vicar (currently John Abdalah, Bishop of Worcester).

Several priests of the AWRV aided in the dialogue and were present for the formal reception in Galloway of the Sarum-rite British diocese of the Autonomous Orthodox Metropolia into the Antiochian Orthodox Archdiocese of the British Isles and Ireland in February 2025.

Because of his association with the founding of Western Orthodoxy in America, the Vicariate holds St. Tikhon of Moscow as its patron saint.

== Liturgy ==
=== Western Rite Commission ===
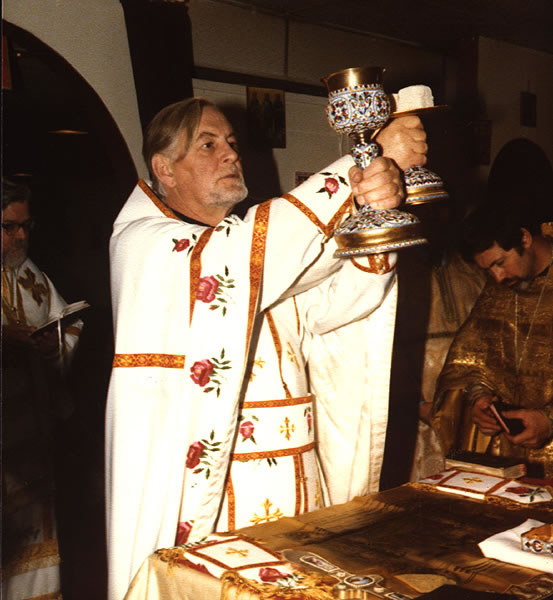
Protobresbyter Alexander Schmemann, an instrumental member of the Western Rite Commission

The development of the current use within the Western Rite Vicariate is of particular note:

Metropolitan Antony was well aware that the Western Rite was "a work for specialists." The new Western Rite usage of the Archdiocese was to be guided by "a Commission of Orthodox Theologians," an advisory committee of qualified clerics or laymen to advise the Metropolitan and determine "the mode of reception of groups desiring to employ the Western Rite, and the character of the rites to be used, as well as the authorization of official liturgical texts." The first WRV Commission, convened by Metropolitan Antony in 1958, was composed of Fathers Paul Schneirla, Stephen Upson, Alexander Schmemann and John Meyendorff. Schneirla, Schmemann, and Meyendorff in particular had seen the Western Rite up close in France, as it had been approved in the Russian Ukase of 1936. Schneirla recalls Schmemann's work in particular as being key, as he was familiar with the Liturgical Movement within the Roman Catholic and Anglican communions. Schmemann was particularly instrumental in joining together the separate Rites of Initiation of the Rituale Romanum – Baptism, Confirmation and First Holy Communion – into one unified rite, according to the Orthodox understanding.

In January of 1962, the official Western Rite Directory was issued, "establishing liturgical usages and customs and discipline," drawing on principles gleaned from the 1904 Moscow Synodal response to Saint Tikhon, the authorization of Western Rite offices by Metropolitan Gerassimos (Messarah) of Beirut, and the 1932 [sic] Russian Ukase of Metropolitan Sergius.

Before his committed and pivotal involvement with the architecture of the current usage of the Roman Rite in the AWRV, Fr. Schmemann had taught at the OCCF's western-rite seminary in Paris, but criticised Western Orthodoxy in a response to a 1958 article Fr. Schneirla wrote in The Word magazine, specifically criticising the restored Gallican Rite of the Orthodox Catholic Church of France, calling it "Weastern". However, after his criticisms, Fr. Schmemann aided in the establishment of the Western Rite Vicariate by serving on the Western Rite Commission.

=== Approved Rites and Liturgies ===
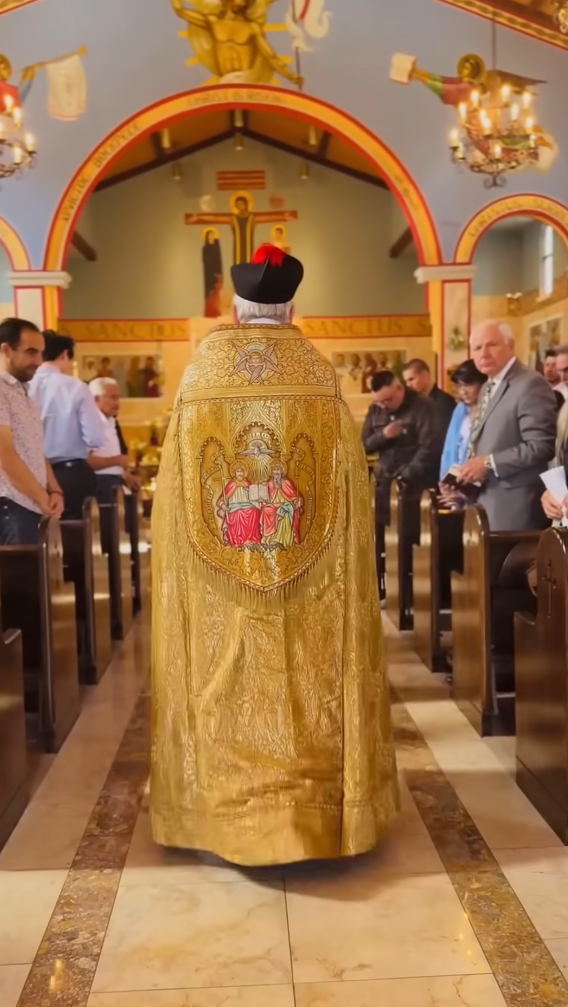
St. Michael's Church in Whittier, CA, celebrating the Mass of St. Gregory.

The AWRV authorises two specific Western liturgical rites—Roman and Anglican—drawing from post-Schism Western sources while ensuring fidelity to the faith of the Orthodox Church. The primary Eucharistic liturgies approved for use are the Mass of St. Gregory for the Roman Rite, and the Mass of St. Tikhon for the Anglican Rite, both of which have undergone revisions by Orthodox authorities.

==== Mass of St. Gregory ====
The Mass of St. Gregory is a correction of the Traditional Latin Mass of the Roman Rite, originating from the Liturgia Missae Orthodoxo-Catholicae Occidentalis of Julian Joseph Overbeck in the 19th century, who proposed purifying the Tridentine Mass by removing dogmatic distortions such as the Filioque, and references to supererogation and papal infallibility. This liturgy received approval from the Russian Holy Synod in 1869 and Holy Synod of the Ecumenical Patriarchate in 1892, and was further refined in the 1936 Moscow Ukase, which mandated the addition of an epiclesis after the Words of Institution, the use of leavened bread, and the administration of Communion under both kinds. In the Vicariate, it follows the texts of the 1995 Orthodox Missal, including an audible Canon and prayers invoking Orthodox hierarchs.

==== Mass of St. Tikhon ====
The Mass of St. Tikhon, named after St. Tikhon of Moscow, derives from the 1928 American Book of Common Prayer and incorporates elements from the Anglican Missal and Roman Rite. It was developed by Fr. Joseph Angwin in 1977, who applied the 1904 Russian Synod's conditional approval of Anglican forms, which required insertions such as an epiclesis drawn from the Divine Liturgy of St. John Chrysostom, invocations of the Mother of God and saints, and prayers for the departed to affirm the sacrificial nature of the Eucharist.

=== Service Books ===
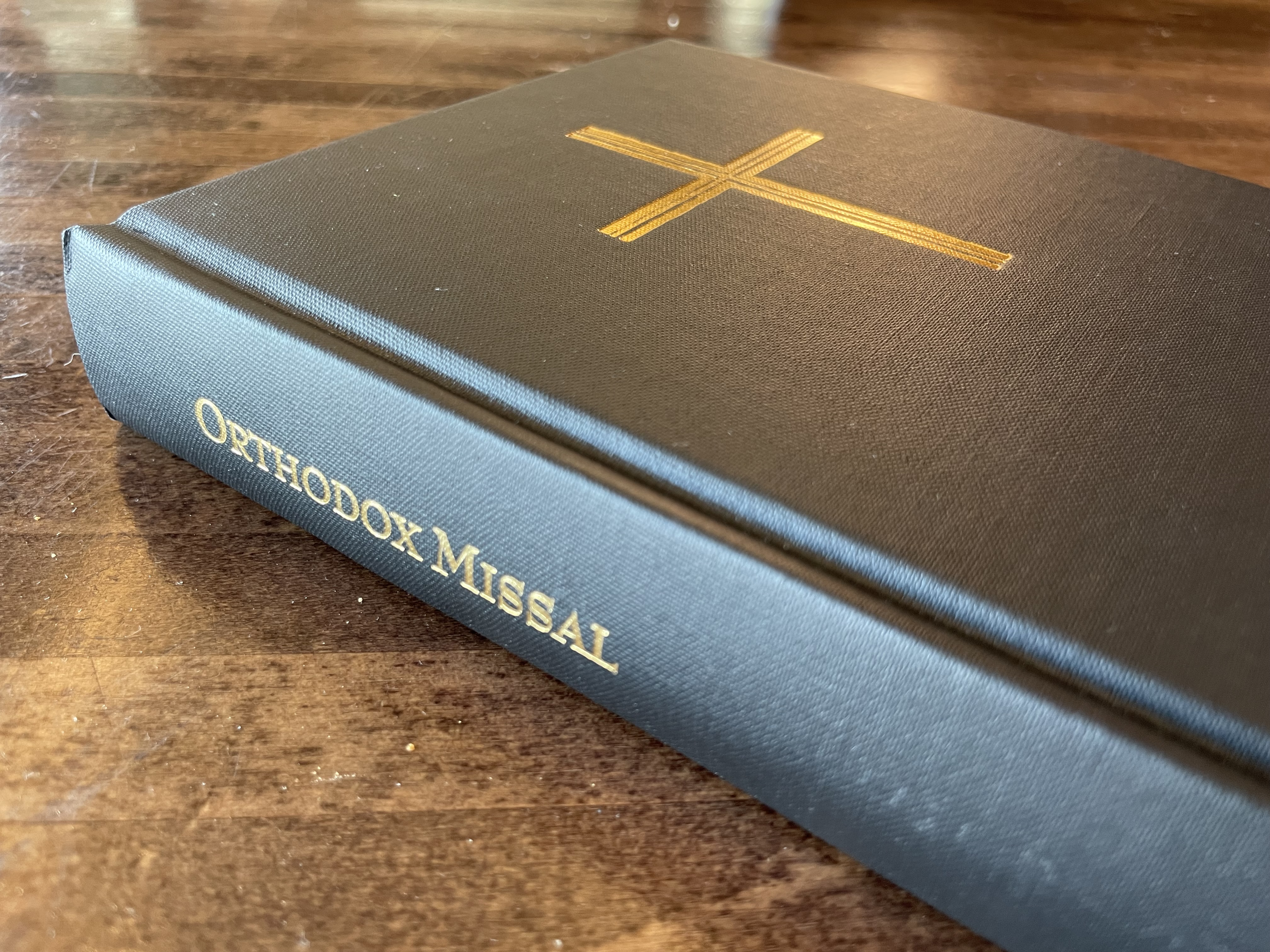
The 1995 edition of The Orthodox Missal, a missal that contains the formula and rubrics for celebrating the Mass of St. Gregory and the Mass of St. Tikhon

The AWRV employs a set of official service books to ensure liturgical uniformity and fidelity to Orthodox theology while preserving Western traditions. The primary parochial resource is the Western Rite Service Book published by St. Luke's Priory Press, which compiles the daily offices of Matins and Vespers, the Mass, and other sacramental rites and devotional materials. The Orthodox Missal, published in 1995 by St. Luke's Priory Press, remains the normative Eucharistic text for the Roman Rite, containing the Mass of St. Gregory with the audible Canon, Orthodox commemorations, and the epiclesis. The Anglican Rite's equivalent is the Saint Andrew's Service Book, produced from St. Andrew's parish in Eustis, Florida, and later reissued by the Vicariate.

For the Benedictine Divine Office, clergy and monastics must celebrate according to The Monastic Diurnal (Oxford, 1957) and The Monastic Breviary: Matins (Society of the Sacred Cross, 1961), with the Anglican Rite celebrating the English Office from St. Luke's Priory Press for Mattins and Evensong. Sacraments and blessings follow the 1993 Ritual printed by the Vicariate, prohibiting extemporaneous prayers in public worship except at the end of sermons.

Hymnals require approval from the Vicar General. To maintain liturgical uniformity, the Vicariate prohibits non-approved innovations, requiring all service books, calendars, and customs to conform to standards set by the Western Rite Commission and approved by the Metropolitan, with printing or duplication needing explicit Vicar General authorisation for official materials.

No single definitive or "received" text currently exists for either rite; the books in use remain authorised but provisional. On October 11, 2025, a proposed official Book of Common Prayer for the Vicariate was completed by Apologia Anglicana Press, and is currently in a "testing phase" while awaiting official authorisation. An official Missal (also called the Western Rite Liturgikon) for the Roman Rite has been in preparation for several years and as of 2025 is reportedly nearing completion.

=== Vestments ===
Vestments in the Vicariate adhere to pre-1950 Western usages, adapted for Orthodox practice, with Byzantine undergarments or vestments forbidden during western-rite services. Clergy wear a long, black woollen cassock (vestis talaris) as the foundational garment, supplemented by items such as the biretta for church services, a cincture for higher dignitaries, and simple black shoes. Sacerdotal vestments include the chasuble, dalmatic, and maniple for liturgical use, with all items required to be of "clean, dignified materials". Accessories like the zucchetto or ferraiolo are permitted under specific conditions, but pontifical elements such as gloves or rings are reserved for bishops and abbots.

=== Praxis ===
Liturgical customs largely derive from that of the Tridentine Use of the Roman Catholic Church as of 1950, modified for Orthodox observance as necessary and emphasising pre-11th-century Western praxis whenever necessary. Propers for the Mass comes from the 1958 edition of the Missale Anglicanum.

Private Masses are forbidden except under necessity with at least one server, and no restorations of other Latin liturgical rites are permitted to occur without Commission review.

==== Leavened Host ====
An example of a host press used to imprint the designs onto leavened slices.

A large prosphora fresh out of a European-style host press, before being cut into the traditional circular wafer.

As explicated in the Western Rite Directory: "The bread used for the Mass shall be leavened hosts made of pure wheaten flour, water and yeast. Other forms of leavened breadlettes are forbidden." Also outlined, "Pastors should apply to the Vicar General for a list of authorized companies, or to receive permission to make their own hosts." AWRV parishes then use a host press or other means to acquire the traditional circular Latin host shape, which to an outsider appears as unleavened.

Exact preparation of the hosts varies from parish to parish. The most common means of preparing it includes:

1. Baking a traditional eastern prosphora with the same recipe of flour, water and yeast
2. Thinly slicing the leavened prosphora
3. Pressing the slices in a host press to imprint the designs

The result of the above is a leavened host with a texture similar to a cracker, and preserving the shape a traditional Latin host with the Christogram or other designs imprinted.

Other parishes may bake a larger loaf, not in the traditional eastern phosphora shape, such that one slice can cover the entire surface of a larger European-style host press, and then cut out the circular hosts.

=== Kalendar ===
The AWRV's kalendar, published yearly in the Ordo, is based on the Benedictine Calendar, which was implemented in the Roman Catholic Benedictine Order in 1915. The Benedictine Calendar has since seen feasts added on an individual basis, and thus does not include some feasts that do exist on the pre-Vatican II General Roman Calendar; one notable example being the Feast of the Precious Blood, which has never been on the Benedictine Calendar, and thus remains an optional feast in the AWRV. The AWRV, as with all other Orthodox churches that use the Revised Julian calendar, celebrates Easter on the Julian calendar date.

== Monasticism ==
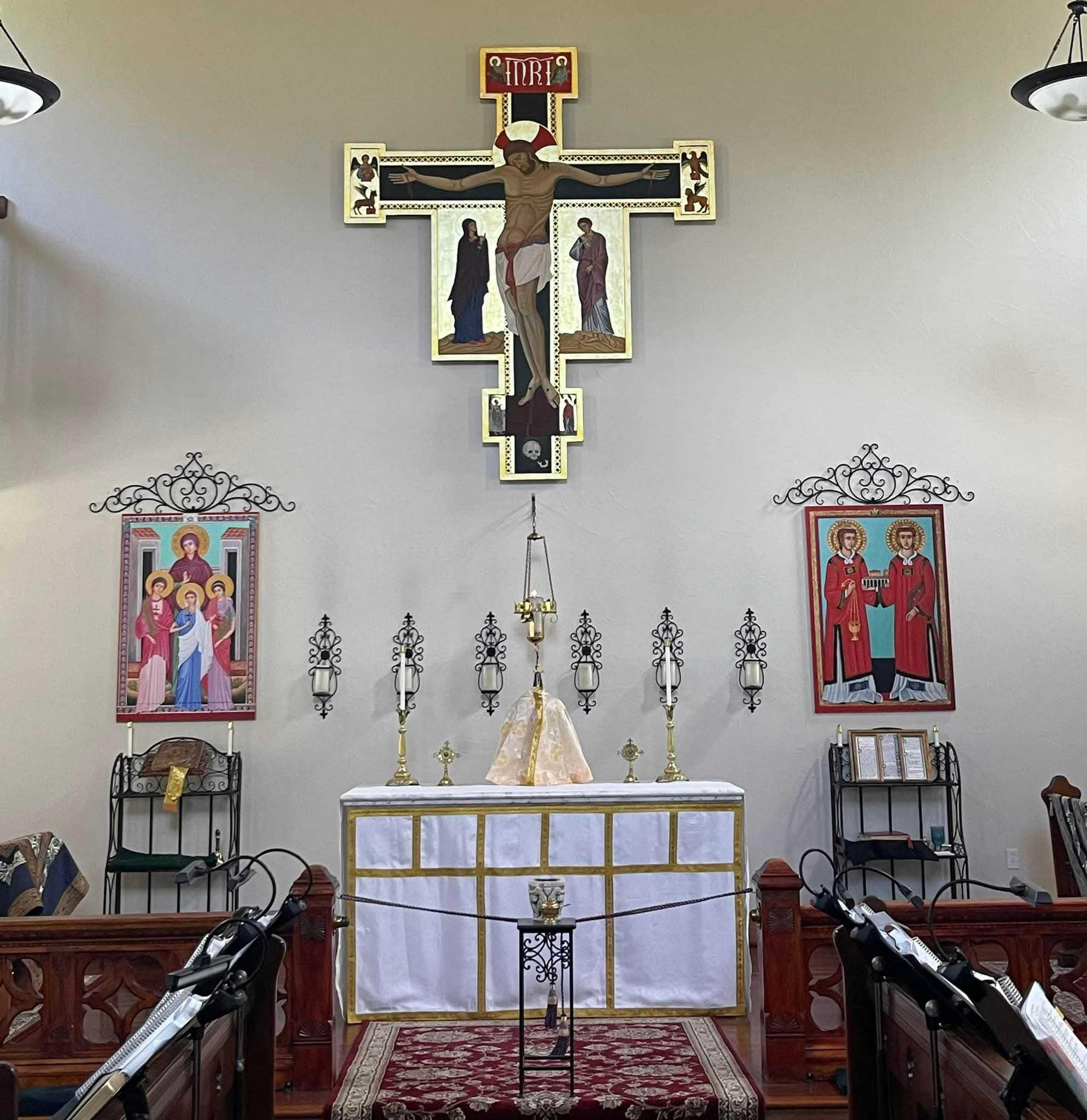
Ladyminster Monastery Interior

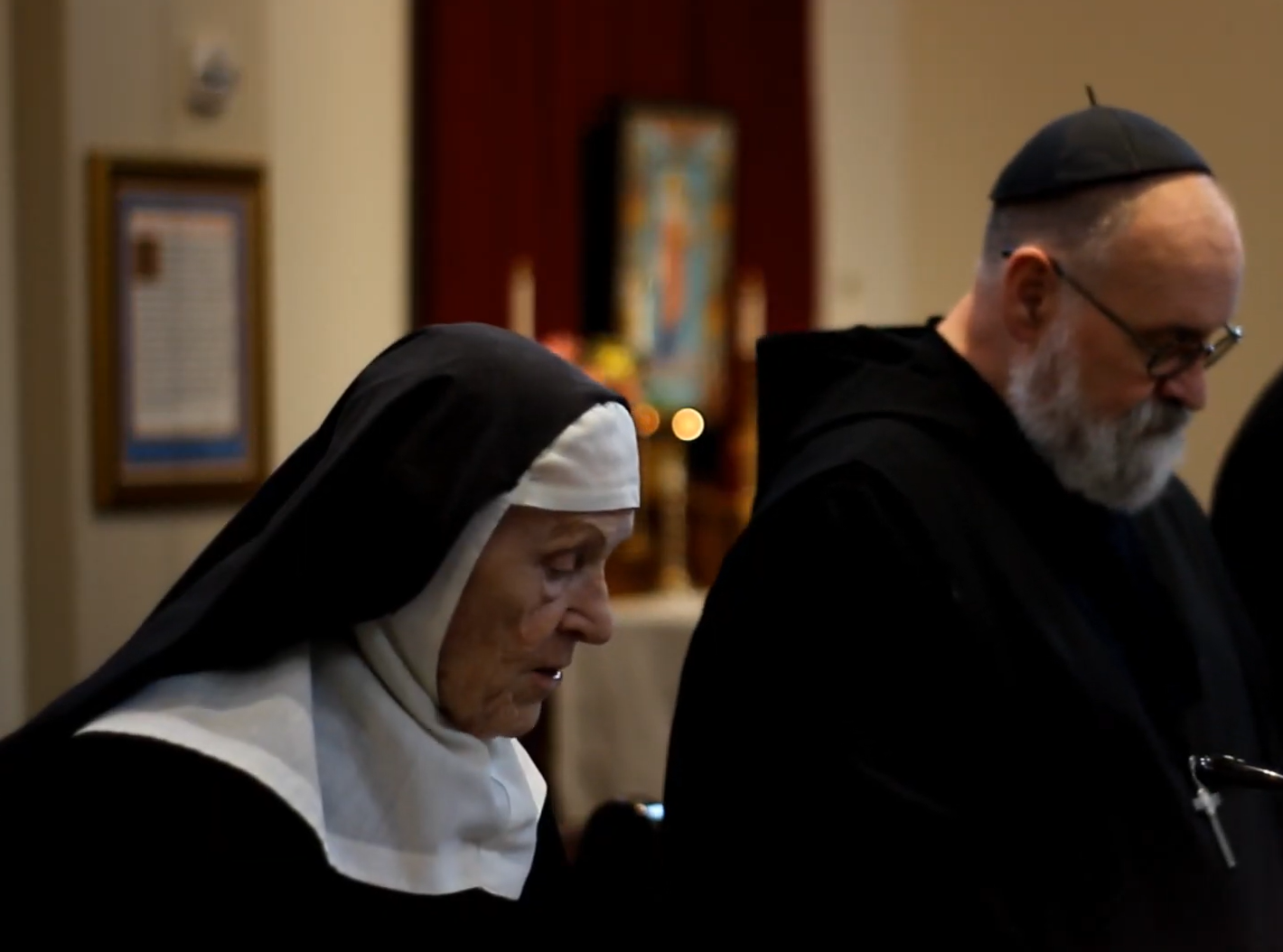
Dom Theodore and Mother Sophia (now reposed)

Beginning the 21st century, Benedictine monasticism and the Order of Saint Benedict have become increasingly important parts of the life of the Western Rite Vicariate.

The Benedictine Fellowship of Saint Laurence bought a mountain property near Cañon City, Colorado, in 2001 as an outgrowth of St. Mark’s Orthodox Church near Washington Park in Denver.

“We had a priest who had this inspiration that we could have a retreat place in the mountains. A beautiful place that, God willing, would turn into a monastery,” said Greenlee, a parishioner of St. Mark’s and a real estate agent in Fort Collins.

The property had one large lodge on the site, where the church began offering retreats in 2001. The Benedictine Fellowship constructed an oratory in 2009. The monastic community of Our Lady of Glastonbury and Saint Laurence (now commonly known as Ladyminster) was officially established on Roodmas (September 14), 2013. Shortly after the foundation of the monastic community in 2013, Br. Theodore was elected as the first Prior. Br. Theodore was ordained to the Holy Diaconate on September 27, 2015, by His Grace Bishop John Abdalah, and officially assigned to the Monastery by His Eminence, Metropolitan Joseph Al-Zehlaoui. On February 1st, 2018, Metropolitan Joseph made his first visitation to the monastery and installed Fr. Theodore as the Abbot. In August of that year, Fr. Theodore was elevated to the Holy Priesthood by Metropolitan Joseph and Bishop John during the 2018 Western Rite Conference. The monastery underwent significant growth in late 2025 and early 2026, nearly doubling in size, and now consists of 10 professed monks, with some residing at the abbey in Cañon City, and others serving at the Glastonbury House, attached to St. Mark's in Denver.

The monastery also has associated monks and nuns, which are associated with monastery but often serve in pastoral or other roles at parish churches or other locations. They are “idiorhythmic”, meaning that they are self-regulating in terms of monastic observance, and self-supporting financially. One notable associated monk is the Right Reverend Benedict Churchill, Bishop of Hartford and the Orthodox Church in America Diocese of New England.

In addition to consisting of professed monks, the Benedictine Fellowship has a considerably large number of oblates. The oblate program consists of five regions, covering all fifty United States, with each region having a Regional Secretary. As of 2025, there are 100 oblates of the monastery, which belong to numerous Orthodox jurisdictions, and are not limited to the Antiochian Archdiocese. The WRV provides all of the necessary liturgical materials for these oblates, at no cost to the Archdiocese.
