= Western Rite (disambiguation) =

Western Rite or Western liturgical rite can refer to:

- Latin liturgical rites, liturgical rites of the Latin Church, also known as the Western Church, which is the main part of the Catholic Church
- Western Rite Orthodoxy, designation for Christian communities within Eastern Orthodoxy or Oriental Orthodoxy, that use traditional western liturgies
- any other liturgical rite of western origin or use in Christian liturgy
- Western Syriac Rite, western variant of the Syriac Rite, itself belonging to the family of Eastern liturgical rites

== See also ==
- Eastern Rite (disambiguation)
