= Liturgy of Saint Tikhon =

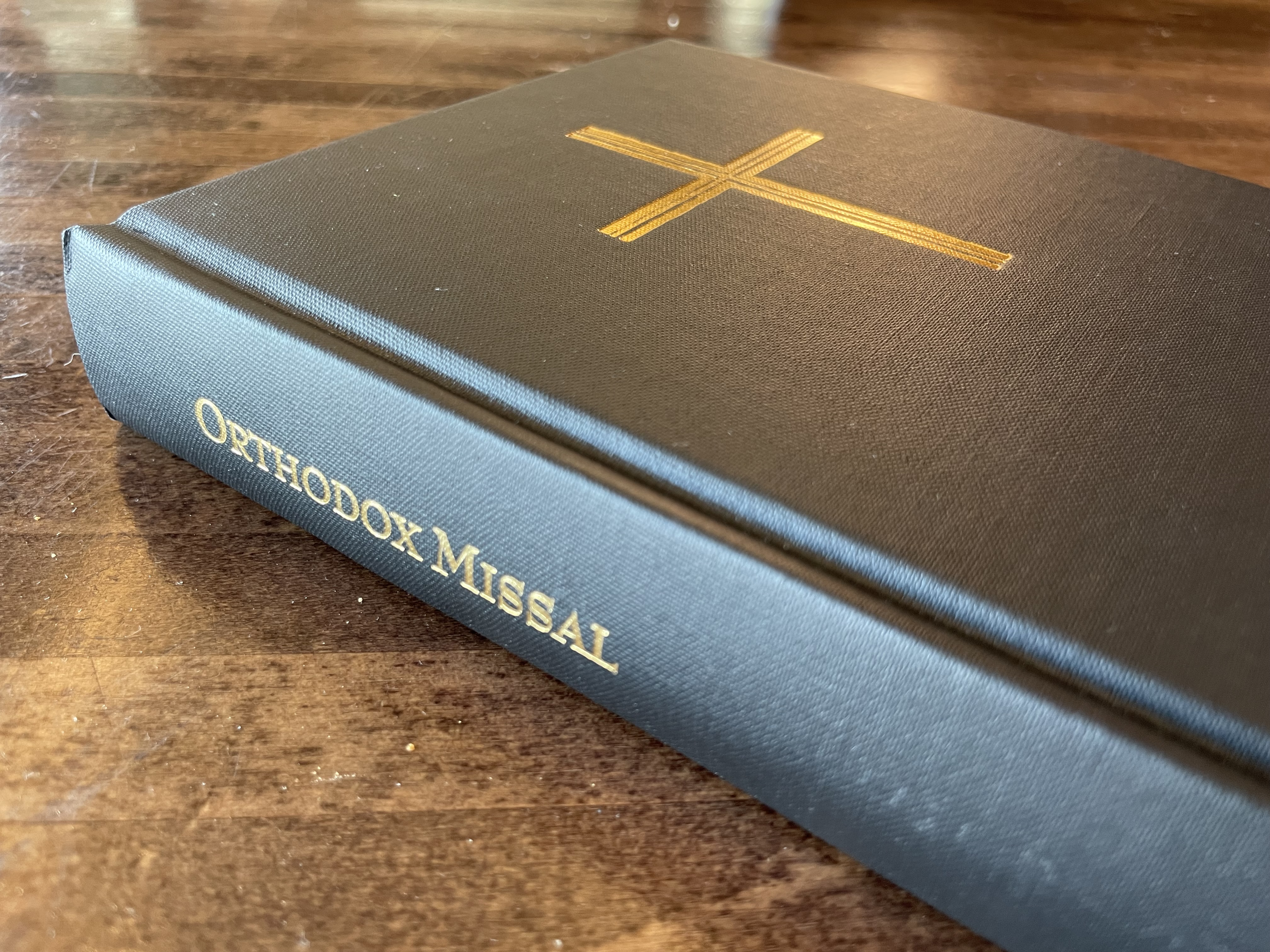
The 1995 edition of Orthodox Missal, an Antiochian Western Rite Vicariate missal that contains the formula and rubrics for celebrating the Liturgy of St. Tikhon

The Liturgy of St. Tikhon is one of the Divine Liturgies authorized for use by the Antiochian Western Rite Vicariate (AWRV) of the Antiochian Orthodox Christian Archdiocese of North America, itself part of the Eastern Orthodox Church. It is authorized for use in the AWRV in two English language texts—that of the Orthodox Missal and that of the Saint Andrew's Service Book.

== Origins ==
The Liturgy of St. Tikhon was produced in the 1970s for use by Episcopalians who wished to convert to Orthodoxy but retain the liturgy to which they were accustomed. The text of the liturgy, therefore, is based upon the Episcopal Church's 1928 Book of Common Prayer (BCP), along with certain features of the Tridentine Mass (the dominant Mass of the Catholic Church prior to its reform after the Second Vatican Council), as well certain modifications to make it conform to Orthodox theology and practice, including a strengthened epiclesis and the omission of the filioque from the Nicene-Constantinopolitan Creed.

The adaptation of the rite was the work of Joseph Angwin. The naming of the liturgy after Tikhon the Enlightener of America is based upon events that occurred when Tikhon was the ruling bishop of the American diocese of the Russian Orthodox Church. Some Episcopalians who wished to become Orthodox asked Bishop Tikhon whether they might be allowed to continue to use their Anglican liturgy, that of the American 1892 Book of Common Prayer (BCP). He sent the BCP to Moscow, where a commission was appointed to examine the issue. The final report addressed the changes that would need to be made in the BCP in order to make it suitable for Orthodox worship, but neither the commission nor Bishop Tikhon actually approved a rite.

== Structure ==
- Asperges (optional)
- Collect for Purity
- Summary of the Law
- Kyrie eleison
- Gloria in excelsis
- Collect of the Day
- Epistle
- Gradual
- Alleluia
- Gospel
- Nicene-Constantinopolitan Creed
- Offertory
- Prayer for the whole state of Christ's Church (Intercessions)
- Confession of sin and absolution
- Dialogue
- Preface
- Sanctus
- Canon
- Lord's Prayer
- Fraction
- Agnus Dei
- Prayer of Humble Access
- Holy Communion
- Prayer of thanksgiving after Communion
- Dismissal
- Blessing of the faithful
- Last Gospel (Prologue of St John's Gospel)

== See also ==
- Western Rite Orthodoxy
