= American World Patriarchates =

Christian religious organization

- Abbreviation: AWP
- Type: Eastern Christian
- Classification: Independent Eastern Orthodox
- Scripture: Septuagint, New Testament
- Theology: Orthodox theology, Palamism, Hesychasm, Clerical marriage, Catholic theology
- Polity: Episcopal
- Liturgy: Byzantine and Western
- Founder: Uladyslau Ryzy-Ryski
- Origin: 1967; New York, N.Y., United States
- Branched from: American Orthodox Catholic Church
- Separations: Belarusian Slavic Orthodox Church Abroad
- Congregations: 60+
- Members: 54,457+

American World Patriarchates, also known as the American World Patriarchs (AWP), is an independent Eastern Orthodox church established by Uladyslau Ryzy-Ryski in 1967. The members of the American World Patriarchates both claim to be Orthodox and Catholic, and practiced the liturgy in the Eastern and Western rites.

== History ==
Byelorussian priest Uladyslau Ryzy-Ryski was consecrated as bishop of Laconia, New Hampshire and the states of New England within a continuation to the American Orthodox Catholic Church. He was also enthroned as an archbishop by the Old Orthodox Catholic Patriarchate of America.

When Ryzy-Ryski established the American World Patriarchates, he organized the church with a deliberately loosely-structured administration; and he elevated other independent sacramental bishops to the patriarchate, several with few to no followers. Through Ryzy-Ryski's American World Patriarchates, those patriarchs he elevated were neither required to recognize his authority, nor come under his episcopal jurisdiction.

In 1972, Ryzy-Ryski was excommunicated from the American Orthodox Catholic Church by Walter Myron Propheta, following his multiple consecrations. After this excommunication, the American World Patriarchates expanded throughout Canada, Hungary, West Germany, Puerto Rico, Colombia, Haiti, Santo Domingo, Brazil, Peru, Argentina, El Salvador, Nigeria, the West Indies, Norway, Sweden, Formosa, and Ukraine.

During his leadership, the People's University of the Americas and Cathedral of Learning of the American World Patriarchates were founded; by 1975, the Cathedral of Learning was barred from conferring diplomas after granting more than 400 degrees without authority from the New York Board of Regents.

In 1978, after the death of Uladyslau Ryzy-Ryski, the leadership of the American World Patriarchates was succeeded by his brother, Emigidius J. Ryzy. He functioned as apostolic administrator. In Italy, a schism would occur within the American World Patriarchates; Viktor Ivan Busa—appointed as coadjutor for Belarus by Uladyslau—proclaimed the foundation of the Belarusian Slavic Orthodox Church Abroad, separate from Ryzy's jurisdiction over the original American World Patriarchs.

In 1997, the American World Patriarchates reported 19,457 members, 17 congregations, and 54 priests in the United States. They also claimed 1 congregation and 3 priests in Canada. In the same report, the American World Patriarchates claimed 1 congregation in Belarus with 35,000 members.

In 2015, Emigidius J. Ryzy died, and one AWP group affiliated to a claimant successor of the Catholicate of the West stated that Ryzy's designated successor refused to administrate over the church, leaving no clear continuation; this group also stated in their report that the AWP did not provide for synodical governance "since each patriarch was independent jurisdictionally and the role of the Apostolic Administrator was co-ordinating and advisory in nature rather than a ruling power" and "due to the nature of the AWP as a loose religious confederation, there will be other clergy and laity who are AWP members while not being affiliated with the Catholicate."

In 2021, the Catholicate of the West under John Edmond Kersey issued a perpetual charter to the American World Patriarchates. The charter noted that the AWP does not depend on one central administration; and although the Catholicate of the West exercises a paternal role of administration, members do not need to be affiliated with this catholicate.
