= Vladislav Ryzy-Ryski =

Vladislav, or Uladyslau Ryzy-Ryski (April 26, 1925 – March 1, 1978), was a Belarusian socio-cultural and religious figure, and founder of the American World Patriarchates. He was also the founder and head of the Belarusian Orthodox National Church or Belarusian Orthodox Church Abroad, and the Orthodox Catholic Autocephalous Church in the USA. The original incarnation of his Belarusian church has several claimant successors, including: the Byelorussian Orthodox Catholic Church of St. Apostle Andrew in both the Eastern and Western Rite, and the Belarusian Slavic Orthodox Church (IOBE-AOCC).

== Biography ==
Vladislav Ryzy-Ryski was born in the Vilna region of Belarus to Belarusian Catholic parents. He was educated at the University of Paris.

In World War II, he served with anti-communist Belarusian revolutionaries, who were trained by the Nazi German military.

In 1965, he was consecrated as bishop within a continuation to the American Orthodox Catholic Church, and enthroned as archbishop within the Old Orthodox Catholic Patriarchate of America.

In 1967 Ryzy-Ryski began a new mission in the Bronx, New York; he called this the American World Patriarchates and its goal was to create an international hierarchy of bishops, with none required to come under his apostolic administration or under his authority. He became known as Patriarch Uladyslau I. During his leadership over the American World Patriarchates, the People's University of the Americas was founded in 1968.

By 1972, Ryzy-Ryski was excommunicated from the American Orthodox Catholic Church by Walter Myron Propheta after having established the American World Patriarchates. By the time of his excommunication, there were at least 17 patriarchates established through the American World Patriarchates.

In 1978, Ryzy-Ryski died at the age of 53, and the Belarusian Orthodox National Church and American World Patriarchates were succeeded by Adam Biletsky and Emigidius J. Ryzy.
