= Aftimios Ofiesh =

Eastern Orthodox bishop

Most Reverend Archbishop Aftimios Ofiesh
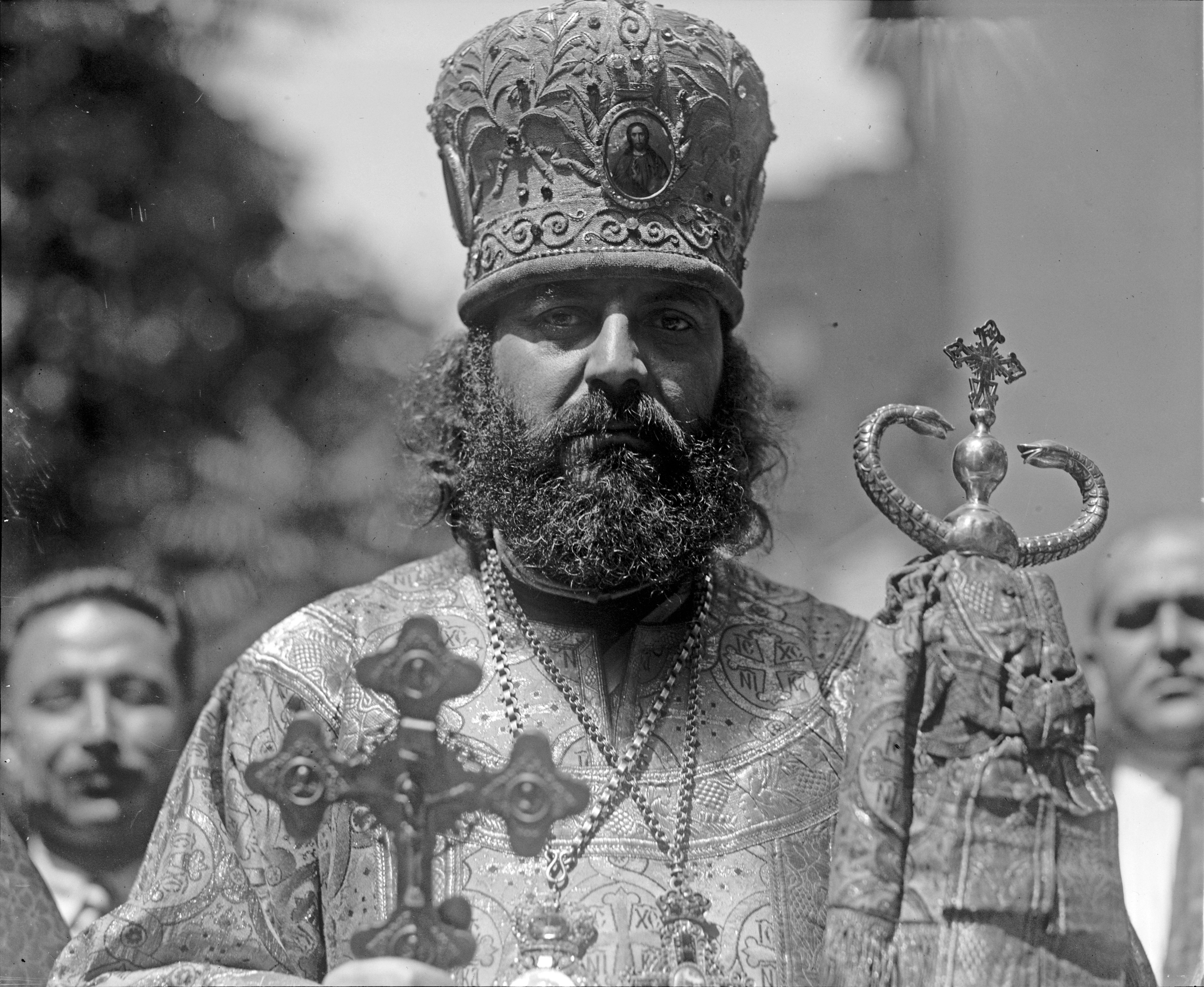
- Church: Russian Orthodox Greek Catholic Church (Orthodox Church in America), American Orthodox Catholic Church
- Predecessor: Raphael of Brooklyn

Orders
- Consecration: May 13, 1917 by Evdokim (Meschersky)

Personal details
- Born: Abdullah Ofiesh; October 22, 1880 Bikfaya, Matn District, Lebanon
- Died: July 24, 1966 (aged 85) Kingston, Luzerne County, Pennsylvania

Aftimios Ofiesh, born Abdullah Ofiesh (October 22, 1880 – July 24, 1966), (Note: name sometimes spelled variously as "Oftimios", "Ofeish", or "Ofiesch") (Note: Woerl, Michael (July 2016). "Archbishop Aftimios (Ofiesh, d. July 1966) of Brooklyn". ROCOR Studies. Dayton, Ohio.) (Note: Damick, Andrew Stephen (2012-07-25). "The Death of Aftimios Ofiesh". Orthodox History.) was an early 20th-century Eastern Orthodox bishop in the United States, serving as the immediate successor to St. Raphael of Brooklyn under the auspices of the Russian Orthodox Church. (Note: Namee, Matthew (2014-10-08). "Who was St. Raphael under - Antioch or Russia?". Orthodox History.) He held the title Bishop of Brooklyn from 1917 to April 1933, founded and led the American Orthodox Catholic Church for six years, and is, perhaps, best known as being the source of various lines of succession of episcopi vagantes.

== Life ==
Born in 1880 as the son of an Orthodox priest, and the sixth of ten children, Ofiesh was reared in Bikfaya, Lebanon. Assisting his father's religious work in his youth, his other relatives attempted to convince him to accept secular employment against desiring monasticism.

Ofiesh, a graduate and valedictorian of the Middle Eastern Orthodox Ecclesiastical Seminary in 1898 at the age of 18, assisted Bishop Gabriel Shatilla in Beirut where he was tonsured as a monk and ordained into the diaconate. In 1902, he was ordained as a priest by Metropolitan Arsenios Haddad. After being appointed an archdeacon, Ofiesh unsuccessfully advocated for reform within the Eastern Orthodox Church as he did in seminary. Facing previous threats of excommunication, a few years later, Aftimios lobbied for modernistic reform and Arab unity and was met with further resistance from Patriarch Meletius II of Antioch who threatened excommunication again.

Arriving in New York State in 1905 with the support of Metropolitan Arsenios, Aftimios was submitted to the leadership of St. Raphael of Brooklyn. Following the untimely death of St. Raphael of Brooklyn in 1915, then Archimandrite Aftimios Ofiesh was elected to serve as his replacement in caring for the Arab Orthodox faithful in North America under the Russian Orthodox Church's canonical authority. He was consecrated by Archbishop Evdokim Meschersky as an auxiliary bishop in 1917 with the title of Bishop of Brooklyn.

In 1922, he was placed in charge of a group of clergy which became known as the "English-speaking Department"—an organization presenting Orthodox Christianity to English-speaking Americans; this followed a previous task in 1905 from the Russian Orthodox.

In 1923, in recognition for his work in the United States, he was elevated by Metropolitan Platon (Rozhdestvensky) of New York to the rank of archbishop. His elevation to the rank of archbishop was disputed and deemed illicit.

In 1924, in the canonical disputes of American Orthodoxy following the onset of the Bolshevik Revolution in Russia, the Arab Orthodox faithful split into two factions: one that wished to go under the canonical authority of the Greek Orthodox Church of Antioch, and another that wished to stay faithful to the Russian Orthodox Church. The former group was organized by Bishop Victor (Abu Assaly) of New York, thus beginning the official presence of the Greek Orthodox Church of Antioch on American soil—today, the Antiochian Orthodox Christian Archdiocese of North America. Under Platon's authority, the Russian Orthodox in America—including Ofiesh—were "under questionable canonical jurisdiction" due to the situation following the Bolshevik Revolution in Russia.

By 1927, Aftimios was commissioned by the Russian diocese in America to form an English-speaking jurisdiction: the American Orthodox Catholic Church. (Note: Stokoe, Mark; Kishkovsky, Leonid. "The Collapse of the Immigrant Church". Orthodox Church in America.)

According to one account, the purpose of the diocese was to establish a new tradition in North America that was separate from any other particular ethnic or cultural traditions. The diocese in its original form only lasted for six years. During this time, Aftimios consecrated four bishops for his new jurisdiction. Additionally, in 1931, the Society of Clerks Secular of St. Basil, a Western Rite Orthodox group, was established under the auspices of this diocese and subsequently led by Bishop Nichols.

According to Fr. Andrew Stephen Damick, the American Orthodox Catholic Church's clergy uphold that it was established with deliberate autonomy and autocephaly through the Russian Orthodox Greek Catholic Church in America;and the intended purpose was "to extend united assistance to Orthodoxy in the mother lands."

In 1932, Archbishop Aftimios was invited to come to St. Mary's Syrian Orthodox Church in Wilkes-Barre, Pennsylvania, to arbitrate a dispute regarding the transfer of its priest, Fr. Constantine Abou-Adal. When Fr. Constantine left St. Mary's in November 1932, the parish was without a pastor, and so Archbishop Aftimios served in that capacity until February 1933, organizing a choir and Sunday School at the parish. During this time, he met and became involved with one of St. Mary's parishioners, Mariam Namey, then subsequently married her in a civil ceremony in April 1933. (Note: "History of the Parish". St. Mary Antiochian Orthodox Church.) (Note: Damick, Andrew Stephen (2012-04-27). "Photo of the week: a newlywed archbishop". Orthodox History.)

Reports vary at this point as to what happened regarding his episcopacy. According to the parish records of St. Mary's, he "was retired" and lived in nearby Kingston until his death in 1966. With the subsequent withdrawal of support for the American Orthodox Catholic Church, it lost any meaningful chance at resolving its disputed status. According to the book Orthodox Christians in North America (1794–1994), however, Aftimios "resigned his episcopacy and married." A newspaper article states he received a private revelation to abolish clerical celibacy. The biography by Ofiesh's widow Mariam claims that Aftimios fully intended to function as a married bishop, having that intent even before he met Mariam.

Relations between the small jurisdiction created by Aftimios and the mainstream Eastern Orthodox Church were not regularized following his marriage and alleged, de facto deposition from the episcopacy. Since that time, numerous and still multiplying lines of succession of episcopi vagantes continue to persist which all trace their roots to Aftimios (mainly through Ignatius Nichols), (Note: Damick, Andrew Stephen (2009-07-18). "From Aftimios Ofiesh to The Satan Seller". Orthodox History.) many of whom regard him as a saint. (Note: "Our Beloved Saint Oftimios". The Holy Byzantine Catholic Orthodox Church.) Some of those bishops are married men, as well, which is a continual stumbling block to their unity with the mainstream Orthodox Church that has, for centuries, maintained a celibate episcopacy.

Following his death in 1966, Aftimios was buried in Maple Hill Cemetery across from St. Mary's Orthodox Cemetery in Wilkes-Barre. His widow, Mariam, subsequently wrote his biography, published in 1999.

== Book ==
The book by Aftimios's widow, while including a great deal of historical information, is not mainly a scholarly work but is, rather, a biography aimed toward the exoneration of her late husband. One of its primary themes throughout is that Aftimios's marriage to Mariam was justified and that the canonical tradition of celibacy for Orthodox bishops is "man-made" and should be abolished.

== Writings ==
- ———— (1926-06-10). "A Basis for Orthodox Consideration of Unity" (PDF). Orthodox Catholic Review. 1 (6) (published June 1927). Archived from the original on 2010-05-08 – via Continuing Episcopal Church.

== Claimed successors ==
Various independent sacramental jurisdictions have claimed apostolic succession through Aftimios Ofiesh. Most of the groups have merged or disbanded. Notable continuations include the American Orthodox Catholic Church (American Orthodox Patriarchate), Byelorussian Orthodox Catholic Church (today the American World Patriarchs), and the American Orthodox Church established in 1972 by Bishop Joseph Thaddeus (Alan Sanford).

== See also ==
- American Orthodox Catholic Church
- Episcopi vagantes
