= Society of St. Basil =

The Society of Clerks Secular of Saint Basil (SSB) was an organization of Western Rite Orthodox Christians which was absorbed by the Antiochian Orthodox Archdiocese of North America and was later reestablished outside of the bounds of canonical Orthodoxy.

== History ==
Bishop Aftimios Ofiesh, at one time the canonical Bishop of Brooklyn, consecrated Ignatius (William Albert) Nichols to be auxiliary bishop of Washington with a specific mission to perform Western Rite work. Nichols founded the society as a devotional society based around the recitation of the Western Breviary and the promotion of Western Rite Orthodoxy. When Aftimios was de facto deposed following his marriage, Bp. Nichols and the society (along with what remained of the American Orthodox Catholic Church) entered into schism with him.

In 1939, Nichols consecrated Alexander (Paul Tyler) Turner, a former Episcopalian and Old Catholic priest, as a bishop. Turner founded a small Western Rite parish (St. Sophia) in Mount Vernon, New York. It was Turner who replaced Ignatius when he died in 1947 since Turner was the only Western Rite bishop at the time. The headquarters for the society also moved to Mount Vernon. A small publishing arm was begun, and Turner began publishing a periodical entitled Orthodoxy.

== Dissolution ==
In 1958, Metropolitan Anthony (Bashir) of the Antiochan Archdiocese of North America promulgated an edict describing the desirability of a Western Rite movement within canonical Orthodoxy. Unknown to others, Turner had begun unofficial consultations with Metropolitan Anthony concerning the possibility of canonical regularization of the SSB as early as 1952 through Fr. Paul Schneirla.

In 1961, the society was received into the Antiochian archdiocese by Metropolitan Anthony. The society was permitted to retain their Western liturgy and became a Western Rite vicariate, with now Fr. Alexander becoming the first vicar general.

== Reestablishment ==
Growing disatisifed with the Antiochian leadership, a portion of the Western Rite congregations left under the leadership of Fr. Forbes and reestablished the Society of St. Basil united to the American Orthodox Catholic Church.

Andrés Girón was the nominal president of the society when it was incorporated in Louisiana in 2008.
