= Sine populo =

Roman Catholic Mass without a congregation

Sine populo (Latin for "without the people") is an expression that is used in the Roman Rite liturgy to describe a Mass celebrated by a priest without a congregation.

== The present Roman Missal ==
The revised edition of the Roman Missal that was promulgated by Pope Paul VI in 1969 presented two forms of the Order of Mass: Ordo Missae cum populo and Ordo Missae sine populo. These two terms appear in the official English translation of the Missal, published in 1973, as "Order of Mass with a congregation" and "Order of Mass without a congregation".

The 1970 General Instruction of the Roman Missal dealt with the first of these forms of celebrating Mass under the numbers 77–152, and with the second under the numbers 209–231. The latter section began with the explanation: "This section gives the norms for Mass celebrated by a priest with only one server to assist him and to make the responses."

In the revised and expanded 2002 edition of the General Instruction, the term Missa cum populo remains as the heading for the information given under numbers 115–198, but the other section (numbers 252–272) speaks of Missa cuius unus tantum minister participat (Mass in which only one server participates). Corresponding to the latter form, the Missal presents the Ordo Missae cuius unus tantum minister participat (literally, Order of Mass in which only one server participates).

== History ==
Mass without a congregation was "known until Vatican Council II as Private Mass (Missa privata)". Josef Andreas Jungmann defined such a Mass as "a Mass celebrated for its own sake, with no thought of anyone participating, a Mass where only the prescribed server is in attendance or even where no one is present, as was the case with the Missa solitaria".

Citing Joseph Jungmann's work on the origin of the Roman Rite, Rausch says that the celebration of private masses is traceable to the 6th century, and O'Loughlin identifies practices associated with it within the Dialogues of Pope Gregory the Great (sed 590-604). Monastic priests began, by the seventh century, to celebrate such Masses daily, and side altars were added to the churches to facilitate celebration by priests in a low voice and regardless of the presence of a congregation or religious community. Decrees were issued against solitary celebration by the priest alone, requiring the assistance of at least two persons, so as to justify the use of the plural in liturgical formulas such as Dominus vobiscum. This rule was later relaxed to having at least one server, so that the 1917 Code of Canon Law prescribed: "A priest is not to celebrate Mass without a server to assist him and make the responses." Making explicit the canonical principle that a proportionate cause excuses from an ecclesiastical law, the present Code of Canon Law states: "A priest may not celebrate the eucharistic Sacrifice without the participation of at least one of the faithful, unless there is a good and reasonable cause for doing so."

In the 16th century, the Protestant Reformers expressed opposition to any Mass without a congregation, but the Council of Trent defended the then existing practice. Canon 6 of session XXII of this council says: "The sacred and holy Synod would fain indeed that, at each Mass, the faithful who are present should communicate, not only in spiritual desire, but also by the sacramental participation of the Eucharist, ...: but not therefore, if this be not always done, does It condemn, as private and unlawful, but approves of and therefore commends, those Masses in which the priest alone communicates sacramentally."

Since the word "private" could be understood as opposed to public, the Code of Rubrics of Pope John XXIII recommended that the expression "private Mass" be avoided, since every properly celebrated Mass is an act of public worship.

The Second Vatican Council decreed: "It is to be stressed that whenever rites, according to their specific nature, make provision for communal celebration involving the presence and active participation of the faithful, this way of celebrating them is to be preferred, so far as possible, to a celebration that is individual and quasi-private."

Pope Paul VI wrote in his encyclical Mysterium fidei (1965) that "even if a priest celebrates it privately" a Mass is not private but "an act of Christ and of the Church". The Church no longer uses the term "private Mass", saying instead "Masses celebrated without the people" (In Missis sine populo celebratis).

== Bibliography ==
- Mary Schaefer and Joanne Pierce, Mass at Which Only One Minister Participates in Edward Foley et alii, A Commentary on the General Instruction of the Roman Missal (Liturgical Press, 2008 ISBN 0-8146-6017-7, 978-0-8146-6017-1),
- Marian Szablewski, Mass without a Congregation: A Sign of Unity or Division? Unum, Cracow, 2004)
