= Epiclesis =

Christian Eucharistic prayer

The epiclesis (also spelled epiklesis; from Ancient Greek: ἐπίκλησις, lit. 'surname' or 'invocation') refers to the invocation of one or several gods. In ancient Greek religion, the epiclesis was the epithet used as the surname given to a deity in religious contexts. The term was borrowed into the Christian tradition, where it designates the part of the Anaphora (Eucharistic Prayer) by which the priest invokes the Holy Spirit (or the power of God's blessing) upon the Eucharistic bread and wine in some Christian churches. In most Eastern Christian traditions, the Epiclesis comes after the Anamnesis (remembrance of Jesus' words and deeds); in the Western Rite it usually precedes. In the historic practice of the Western Christian Churches, the consecration is effected at the Words of Institution, though during the rise of the Liturgical Movement, many denominations introduced an explicit epiclesis in their liturgies.

== Ancient Greece ==
The Ancient Greek term epíklēsis (ἐπίκλησις; literally 'calling upon') can be translated as 'surname, additional name', or as 'invocation, appeal'.

In ancient Greek religion, the epiclesis was used as the surname that was associated with a deity during religious invocations, in contrast to the more general term 'epithet' (ἐπίθετον), which is used in poetic contexts. In the 2nd century AD, the Greek geographer Pausanias used the term 'epiclesis' to designate the appellation under which a deity was honoured in specific places or occasions.

== Christianity ==
=== Eastern churches ===
In 2001, the Pontifical Council for Promoting Christian Unity on admission to the Eucharist between Chaldean Catholic Church and Assyrian Church of the East issued a statement stating that the Words of Institution are dispersed euchologically in the Liturgy of Addai and Mari, wherein the words are stated not in immediate sequence but throughout the Liturgy. The Eastern Orthodox Churches hold the Epiclesis to be the moment at which the consecration of the bread and wine is completed. However, the actual process of change is not considered to begin at this moment, but rather to have begun with the Liturgy of Preparation—it is merely completed at the Epiclesis.

In the 20th century, when Western Rite Orthodox parishes began to be established, liturgies were derived from Catholic Latin liturgical rites and the Anglican Book of Common Prayer. These liturgies saw a "stronger" Epiclesis inserted, as to better align them with the Byzantine liturgy.

==== Liturgy of St. Cyril (and Alexandrian-type Anaphoras) ====
In the Liturgy of St. Cyril (also known as Egyptian Liturgy of St. Mark), the Epiclesis typically appears after the post-sanctus prayer. The structure is usually as follows: Epiclesis I—Institution Narrative—Anamnesis—Epiclesis II. Since this group of liturgies contain the earliest full anaphoras available to us, they have become incredibly important in understanding the development of liturgical prayers. The epicleses of these anaphoras are seen as consecratory; however, recent papers have shown that the liturgical thought of Egypt was less focused on a specific moment of consecration, being more process-focused in terms of Eucharistic Consecration.

==== Liturgy of Addai and Mari ====
In its pure form, the ancient anaphora of the Liturgy of Addai and Mari used in the Church of the East (East Syriac Rite) does include an epiclesis. It does not use the Words of Institution, although they appear directly and indirectly in other parts of the rite (and are therefore considered to be implicit).

Priest: We too, my Lord, your feeble, unworthy, and miserable servants who are gathered in your name and stand before you at this hour, and have received by tradition the example which is from you, while rejoicing, glorifying, exalting, and commemorating, perform this great, fearful, holy, life-giving, and divine Mystery of the passion, death, burial, and resurrection of our Lord and Savior, Jesus Christ.

And may there come, O my Lord, your Holy Spirit, and may he rest upon this oblation of your servants. May he bless it and hallow it, and may it be for us, O my Lord, for the pardon of debts, the forgiveness of sins, the great hope of resurrection from the dead, and for new life in the kingdom of heaven with all who have been well-pleasing before you. And for all this great and marvelous dispensation towards us we will give thanks to you and praise you without ceasing in your church, which is saved by the precious blood of your Christ.

==== Liturgy of St. James ====
In the Liturgy of Saint James, according to the form in which it is celebrated on the island of Zakynthos, Greece, the anaphora is as follows:

Priest (aloud): Thy people and Thy Church entreat Thee. (thrice)

People: Have mercy on us, Lord God, the Father, the Almighty. (thrice)

The Priest, in a low voice: Have mercy on us, Lord God, the Father, the Almighty. Have mercy on us, God our Saviour. Have mercy on us, O God, in accordance with Thy great mercy, and send forth upon these holy gifts, here set forth, Thine all-holy Spirit, (bowing) the Lord and giver of life, enthroned with Thee, God and Father, and Thine only-begotten Son, co-reigning, consubstantial and co-eternal, who spoke by the Law and the Prophets and by Thy New Covenant, who came down in the form of a dove upon our Lord Jesus Christ in the river Jordan, and rested upon him, who came down upon Thy holy Apostles in the form of fiery tongues in the upper room of holy and glorious Sion on the day of Pentecost. (Standing up) Thy same all-holy Spirit, Lord, send down on us and on these gifts here set forth,

(aloud): that having come by his holy, good and glorious presence, He may sanctify this bread and make it the holy Body of Christ,

People: Amen.

Priest: and this Cup (chalice) the precious Blood of Christ,

People: Amen.

The Priest signs the holy Gifts and says in a low voice: that they may become for all those who partake of them for forgiveness of sins and everlasting life. For sanctification of souls and bodies. For a fruitful harvest of good works. For the strengthening of Thy holy, Catholic and Apostolic Church, which Thou didst found on the rock of the faith, so that the gates of Hell might not prevail against it, delivering it from every heresy and from the scandals caused by those who work iniquity, and from the enemies who arise and attack it, until the consummation of the age.

==== Liturgy of St. John Chrysostom ====
In the Divine Liturgy of Saint John Chrysostom an epiclesis is present (explicit); the priest says:

Priest: Again we offer to Thee this spiritual and bloodless worship; and we beg Thee, we ask Thee, we pray Thee: Send down Thy Holy Spirit upon us and upon these Gifts set forth.
Priest: God Cleanse me a sinner and have mercy on me(3)
Priest: O Lord, Who didst send down Thy most Holy Spirit at the third hour on Thy apostles, take Him not from us O Good One, but renew Him in us who pray unto Thee
(Deacon: Create in me a clean heart, O God, and renew a right spirit within me)
Priest: O Lord, Who didst send down Thy most Holy Spirit at the third hour on Thy apostles, take Him not from us O Good One, but renew Him in us who pray unto Thee
(Deacon: Create in me a clean heart, O God, and renew a right spirit within me)
Priest: O Lord, Who didst send down Thy most Holy Spirit at the third hour on Thy apostles, take Him not from us O Good One, but renew Him in us who pray unto Thee
(Deacon [pointing with his orarion to the diskos]: Bless, Master, the Holy Bread.)
Priest: Make this bread the Precious Body of Thy Christ,
(Deacon [pointing to the chalice]: Amen. Bless, Master, the Holy Cup.)
Priest: And that which is in this Cup, the Precious Blood of Thy Christ,
(Deacon [pointing to both]: Amen. Bless them both, Master.)
Priest: Changing them by Thy Holy Spirit.
(Deacon: Amen, Amen, Amen.)

==== Liturgy of St. Basil the Great ====
In the Liturgy of Saint Basil the Great, according to the Greek recension of the prayers, the liturgical actions described above for the Liturgy of Saint John Chrysostom are the same. The formula is as follows:

Priest: Therefore, O Most-holy Master we sinners and Thine unworthy servants also, having been vouchsafed to minister at Thy holy Altar, not because of our righteousness, for we have not done that which is good on the earth, but because of Thy mercies and Thy compassions, which Thou hast poured out richly upon us, dare to draw nigh unto Thy holy Altar; and having presented the sacred emblems of the Body and Blood of Thy Christ, we pray Thee, and we call upon Thee: O Holy of Holies, through the favour of Thy goodness send Thy Holy Spirit down upon us, and upon these Gifts presented here, and bless them, sanctify, and manifest them.
(Deacon [pointing with his orarion to the diskos]: Bless, Master, the Holy Bread.)
Priest: And make this Bread itself the precious Body of our Lord and God and Saviour Jesus Christ,
(Deacon [pointing to the chalice: Amen. Bless, Master, the Holy Cup.)
Priest: And that which is in this Cup, the precious Blood itself of our Lord and God and Saviour Jesus Christ,
(Deacon [pointing to both]: Amen. Bless them both, Master.)
Priest: Which was shed for the life of the world, and for its salvation.
(Deacon: Amen)
Priest: Changing them by Thy Holy Spirit.
(Deacon: Amen, Amen, Amen.)

=== Roman Rite ===
In the Catholic Church, the Words of Institution are considered to be the moment of Transubstantiation (when, according to religious tradition, the eucharistic elements would change from bread and wine into the actual Body and Blood of Christ). The Catechism of the Catholic Church teaches that "The Epiclesis ("invocation upon") is the intercession in which the priest begs the Father to send the Holy Spirit, the Sanctifier, so that the offerings may become the body and blood of Christ and that the faithful by receiving them, may themselves become a living offering to God." Still later it asserts, "At the heart of the Eucharistic celebration are the bread and wine that, by the words of Christ and the invocation of the Holy Spirit, become Christ's Body and Blood."

==== Implicit epicleses ====
In the 1962 Roman Missal, the prayer Quam oblationem of the Roman Canon has been interpreted as an "implicit" epiclesis. Josef Jungmann supported this view that the Quam oblationem "is a plea for the final hallowing of the earthly gift."

Be pleased, O God, we pray,
to bless, acknowledge,
and approve this offering in every respect;
make it spiritual and acceptable,
so that it may become for us
the Body and Blood of your most beloved Son,
our Lord Jesus Christ.

In the 1962 Canon, the priest begins the Quam oblation with hands folded, opens them placing his left hand on his chest and then makes three are large signs of the cross with his extended right hand over both bread and wine as indicated by "+" in between the words benedictam (blessed), adscriptam (approved), ratam (ratified), below. The fourth sign of the cross is made over the bread and the fifth over the wine at the words Corpus and Sanguis, respectively. The prayer is immediately followed by the Institution Narrative with the words of Jesus Christ.

Quam oblationem tu, Deus, in omnibus, quæsumus,
bene + dictam,
adscrip + tam,
ra + tam, rationabilem, acceptabilemque facere digneris:
ut nobis
Cor + pus
et San + guis
fiat dilectissimi Filii tui, Domini nostri Iesu Christi.

Nicholas Cabasilas, a 14th-century Eastern Orthodox writer, held that the Roman Canon did not solely consecrate via the Words of Institution–which was typically identified as the consecratory element by contemporaneous Latin theologians–but instead retained an implicit epiclesis in the Supplices te rogamus that was the consecratory element. Responding to Latin criticisms of Greek emphasis on the epiclesis, Cabasilas asserted the epiclesis as a necessary component of Eucharistic consecration. However, Cabasilas clarified that the epiclesis and Words of Institution are interdependent in order to create an effectual anaphora. Ultimately, Cabasilas assessed that while some Latin liturgical practices appeared errant, the Latin doctrine of the Eucharist was identical to that Eastern Orthodox and that there was a mostly shared ritual practice. At the Council of Florence, Cabasilas's necessity of the epiclesis was challenged and ultimately rejected by Latin theologians; modern Catholic teaching is generally more receptive of Cabasilas. As a result, Cabasilas's work remains a frequent point of discussion in ecumenical dialogues."

In Western Rite Orthodox parishes, an epiclesis, modified from that of the Byzantine Rite Liturgy of St. John Chrysostom, is inserted into the Roman Canon, immediately before the Supplices. The addition of an epiclesis was originally suggested by Joseph Overbeck, the first person to make serious petitions for the restoration of an Orthodox western rite. This opinion on the need of an epiclesis was shared by the Synod of the Russian Orthodox Church, who added an epiclesis to the modified book of common prayer, later known as the Divine Liturgy of St. Tikhon. When the Gregorian Liturgy was approved for use in 1961, the Overbeck missal was approved for use, including the epicleses. This epiclesis shares most of its text with that of the Liturgy of St. John, but with certain omissions, streamlining it better into the canon.

And we beseech, Thee, O Lord, to send down Thy Holy Spirit upon (us and upon) these offerings,
that He would make this bread the precious body of Thy Christ,
and that which is in this cup,
the precious blood of Thy Son, our Lord Jesus Christ.
Transmuting/Changing (them) by the Holy Spirit

Many variances exist in the exact text of the epiclesis, due to translation inconsistency and different schools of thought on how the modified canon should be handled (e.g. should the elevation of the host and chalice remain?)

Still another possible implicit epiclesis of the Roman Liturgy is the Veni, Sanctificator which, however, is one of the 1962 Missal's offertory prayers and is not part of the Roman Canon:

Come, Thou, the Sanctifier,
God, almighty and everlasting:
bless this sacrifice
which is prepared for the glory of Thy holy name.

Moreover, this prayer is not included in the 1970 Roman Missal.

==== Explicit epicleses ====
The additional Eucharistic Prayers (EP) introduced into the Roman Rite in the 1969 revision have both a pre-consecration and a post-consecration epiclesis.

Pre-consecration

Eucharistic Prayer II: Make holy, therefore, these gifts, we pray

by sending down your Spirit upon them like the dewfall,
so that they may become for us
the Body and Blood of our Lord Jesus Christ.

Eucharistic Prayer III: Therefore, O Lord, we humbly implore you

by the same Spirit graciously make holy
these gifts we have brought to you for consecration,
that they may become the Body and Blood
of your Son our Lord Jesus Christ,
at whose command we celebrate these mysteries.

Eucharistic Prayer IV: Therefore, O Lord, we pray:

may this same Holy Spirit
graciously sanctify these offerings,
that they may become
the Body and Blood of our Lord Jesus Christ
for the celebration of this great mystery
which he himself left us
as an eternal covenant.

Post-consecration

Eucharistic Prayer II: Humbly we pray,

that, partaking of the Body and Blood of Christ
we may be gathered into one by the Holy Spirit.

Eucharistic Prayer III: Look, we pray, upon the oblation of your Church

and, recognising the sacrificial Victim by whose death
you willed to reconcile us to yourself,
grant that we, who are nourished
by the Body and Blood of your Son
and filled with his Holy Spirit,
may become one body, one spirit in Christ.

Eucharistic Prayer IV: Look, O Lord, upon the Sacrifice

which you yourself have provided for your Church,
and grant in your loving kindness
to all who partake of this one Bread and one Chalice
that, gathered into one body by the Holy Spirit,
they may truly become a living sacrifice in Christ
to the praise of your glory.

=== Protestantism ===
==== Lutheranism and Anglicanism ====
Lutheran and Anglican divines have argued that in earlier liturgies of theirs in which an Epiclesis and unity with the one sacrifice of Christ may not have seemed explicit (as with the 1662 Book of Common Prayer), it was stated as the point of the consecration in other parts of the rite, notably in required exhortations (the Words of Institution).

In present-day practice, Anglicans in the USA and American Lutheran Eucharistic prayers and newer Old Catholic anaphoras, tend to follow the Eastern practice of treating the Words of Institution as a warrant for the action, with the Epiclesis following the anamnesis/oblation. For example, after the Words of Institution, the epiclesis in Eucharistic Prayer B in the American Book of Common Prayer (which is found in the Canadian Book of Alternative Service and several other Anglican liturgies) reads:

"And we offer our sacrifice of praise and thanksgiving to you, O Lord of All,
presenting to you, from your creation, this bread and this wine.
We pray you, gracious God, to send your Holy Spirit upon these gifts
that they may be + the Sacrament of the Body of Christ and his Blood of the new Covenant.
Unite us to your Son in his sacrifice, that we may be acceptable through him,
being + sanctified by the Holy Spirit."

After the Words of Institution in the Lutheran Book of Worship, for example, the epiclesis in Eucharistic Prayer III reads:

"And we implore you
mercifully to accept our praise and thanksgiving
and, with your Word and Holy Spirit,
to bless us, your servants,
and these your own gifts of bread and wine;
that we and all who share in the + body and blood of your Son
may be filled with Heavenly peace and joy
and, receiving the forgiveness of sin,
may be + sanctified in soul and body,
and have our portion with all your saints."

==== Methodism ====
The Sunday Service of the Methodists, the first Methodistic liturgical text, saw the "words of institution as the main consecratory act". The Wesleys "introduced the epiclesis in their eucharistic hymns"; as such, early Methodists sung a hymnic epiclesis from Hymns of the Lord's Supper (HLS) after the Words of Institution. According to a 2003 report of the British Methodist Church, His Presence Makes The Feast: Holy Communion in the Methodist Church: "The one Spirit by whom we are all baptised into the one body (1 Corinthians 12:13) is the same Spirit who unites us in and with the body of Christ in Holy Communion. The Holy Spirit at work in the Church of the Acts of the Apostles brings into effect a witnessing and preaching community in which there is apostolic teaching, fellowship, prayer and the breaking of the bread (Acts 2:42)." The epiclesis of the present-day liturgy in many Methodist connexions draws from both the Anglican tradition, such as the 1549 Prayer Book, and the liturgical renewal movement of the 20th century that focused upon liturgies of the ancient church, such as the early rite of Hippolytus. From these traditions, John Wesley, the founder of Methodism, inherited the notion that the Holy Spirit was to be invoked to make real and true all that God had promised to bestow on the faithful through Holy Communion. This theology of epiclesis is evidenced in several Methodist hymns written by Charles Wesley, the brother of John Wesley.

The epiclesis used in The United Methodist Church is as follows:

"Pour out your Holy Spirit on us gathered here,
and on these gifts of bread and wine.
Make them be for us the body and blood of Christ,
that we may be for the world the body of Christ,
redeemed by his blood.
By your Spirit make us one with Christ,
one with each other,..." (UMH; pages 10, 14).

The traditional rite of Holy Communion used before the publication of the 1989 hymnal did not include an explicit epiclesis. The traditional text, with slight revisions, is Word and Table IV, and it contains a 16 word, two line epiclesis, as follows:

"bless and sanctify with thy Word and Holy Spirit
these thy gifts of bread and wine" (UMH, page 29.)

Another epiclesis used in the Methodist Church in Great Britain is as follows:

"Send down your Holy Spirit
that these gifts of bread and wine
may be for us the body and blood of Christ.
Unite us with him for ever
and bring us with the whole creation
to your eternal kingdom."

==== Reformed (Continental Reformed, Presbyterian and Congregationalist) ====
Reformed churches generally hold a spiritual presence (pneumatic presence) view of communion. The Continental Reformed, Presbyterian, and Congregationalist traditions of Reformed Christianity resisted the imposition of particular prayers like those found in the Book of Common Prayer, producing alternative guidelines like the Directory for Public Worship. Nevertheless, ministers in these churches may make use of common liturgical prayers, including the epiclesis, that follow the same ecumenical shape as in other traditions.

The epiclesis found in the Book of Common Worship (PCUSA) reads:

Gracious God,
pour out your Holy Spirit upon us
and upon these your gifts of bread and wine,
that the bread we break
and the cup we bless
may be the communion of the body and blood of Christ.
By your Spirit make us one with Christ,
that we may be one with all who share this feast,
united in ministry in every place.
As this bread is Christ’s body for us,
send us out to be the body of Christ in the world.

In the Christian Reformed Church:

Lord, our God, send your Holy Spirit upon us,
that all who eat and drink at this table
may be one body and one holy people,
a living sacrifice to the glory of Jesus Christ,
in whose name we pray. Amen.

=== Use in other sacraments ===
A similar invocation of the Holy Spirit by the priest in some other sacraments is also called an epiclesis. The Eastern Orthodox Church holds that such an epiclesis is necessary for the validity of the Holy Mystery (sacrament) of marriage; the Roman Catholic Church holds that it is not, since for them the bride and groom are the ministers of that sacrament.

An epiclesis also appears in the Orthodox rite of Baptism. Baptism in the Roman Rite includes an epiclesis as part of the blessing of the baptismal water:

"We ask you, Father, with your Son to send the Holy Spirit upon the water of this font. May all who are buried with Christ in the death of baptism rise also with him to newness of life. We ask this through Christ our Lord."

In the Roman Rite sacrament of Confirmation, the bishop invokes the Holy Spirit upon those being confirmed:

"Send your Holy Spirit upon them to be their Helper and Guide."

Other epicleses include that in the Eastern Orthodox Great Blessing of Waters on the feast of the Theophany.
