= Eastern Rite =

Eastern Rite or Eastern liturgical rite may refer to:

- a liturgical rite used in Eastern Christianity:
  - liturgical rites of the Eastern Orthodox Church, which mainly use the Byzantine liturgical rites
  - liturgical rites of the Oriental Orthodox Churches, which uses a variety of liturgical rites
  - Eastern Catholic liturgy, the assortment of liturgical practices utilized in Eastern Catholic bodies
  - the Eastern Syriac Rite, an eastern variant of Syriac Rite, used by several different churches
- Eastern Catholic Churches, sometimes known as "Eastern-Rite Catholic Churches"

== See also ==
- Western Rite (disambiguation)
