= Western Rite Orthodoxy =

Western liturgy in Eastern Orthodox Churches

Western Rite Orthodoxy, also called Western Orthodoxy or the Orthodox Western Rite, are congregations within the Eastern Orthodox tradition which perform their liturgy in Western forms.

Besides altered versions of the Tridentine Mass, congregations have used Western liturgical forms such as the Sarum Rite, the Mozarabic Rite, and Gallican Rite. Some congregations use what has become known simply as the English Liturgy, which is derived from the Anglican Book of Common Prayer, albeit with some changes to restore pre-Reformation Western practices such as invocation of the saints and a few Byzantinizations intended to emphasize Eastern Orthodox theological teaching. The Western Rite that exists today has been heavily influenced by the life and work of Julian Joseph Overbeck.

Western Rite missions, parishes and monasteries exist within certain jurisdictions of the Eastern Orthodox Church, predominantly within the Russian Orthodox Church Outside Russia and Antiochian Orthodox Christian Archdiocese of North America.

In addition, the Western Rite is practiced within religious communities outside the mainstream Eastern Orthodox Church. The Communion of the Western Orthodox Churches and the Orthodox Church of France are entirely Western Rite. Furthermore, there is a small number of Western Rite communities among the Old Calendarists, such as the former Western Rite Exarchate of the Holy Synod of Milan and the Autonomous Orthodox Metropolia of North and South America and the British Isles. Within independent Orthodoxy, the American Orthodox Catholic Church's successors have Western Rite metropolitan jurisdictions. There also are a number of independent Western Orthodox churches and monasteries that are not part of the Eastern Orthodox Church.

Western Rite parishes are found almost exclusively in countries with large Roman Catholic or Protestant populations. There are also numerous devotional societies and publishing ventures related to the Western Rite. Western Rite Orthodoxy remains a contentious issue for some.

== Origins ==
=== Nineteenth century ===
From 1864, Julian Joseph Overbeck, a former Roman Catholic priest, worked to establish a modern Orthodox Western Rite. Overbeck converted from Catholicism to Lutheranism and married. He then emigrated to England in 1863 to become professor of German at the Royal Military Academy, Woolwich, where he also undertook studies of the Church of England and Orthodoxy. In 1865 Overbeck was received as a layman into the Russian Orthodox Church (because he had married following his ordination as a Roman Catholic priest), by Father Eugene Poppoff, at the Russian Embassy in London.

As a part of his conversion into the ROC, Overbeck requested permission from the Holy Synod of the Russian Orthodox Church to begin a Western Orthodox church in England. Initially, Philaret was hesitant about Overbeck's request, but did not rule out the idea entirely. Overbeck outlined his rationale for a Western Orthodox Church in his 1866 book Catholic Orthodoxy and Anglo-Catholicism, a largely polemical work describing why the established Western churches should be rejected.

Overbeck convinced others about the feasibility of a Western Orthodox church and in 1869 submitted a petition containing 122 signatures, including many in the Oxford Movement, to the Holy Synod asking for the creation of a Western liturgical rite within the ROC. A synodical commission investigated Overbeck's petition, in 1870 he stated his case before the commission in St. Petersburg. The commission approved the petition and he was instructed to present a revised Western liturgy for evaluation by the commission. He presented a revised Western liturgy in December. That liturgy was subsequently approved for use – specifically in the British Isles.

By 1876, Overbeck appealed to other Orthodox Churches for their recognition of his plan. In 1879 he was received in audience by the Patriarch Joachim III of Constantinople, who recognized the theoretical right of Western Christians to have a Western Orthodox Church. Three years later, Joachim III and the Synod of the Ecumenical Patriarchate conditionally approved Overbeck's Western rite and Benedictine offices. However, Overbeck's efforts ultimately did not result in the establishment of a Western Orthodoxy. He was especially suspicious of the role which the Greeks in London (and the Church of Greece generally) played in the stagnation of his ambitions, directly blaming the Greek Church's protest against the plan in 1892. The Orthodox Catholic Review ended publication in 1885 and Overbeck died in 1905 without seeing a Western Orthodox Church. Georges Florovsky summed up Overbeck's experience in this way: "it was not just a fantastic dream. The question raised by Overbeck was pertinent, even if his own answer to it was confusedly conceived. And probably the vision of Overbeck was greater than his personal interpretation."

=== Twentieth century ===
Some speculate Bishop Mathew's 1909 Old Catholic Missal and Ritual may have been approved as a Western Rite liturgy by Pope Photios of Alexandria. Both unions were contracted in quick succession and only lasted for an effective period of a few months. Though the union was protested by the Archbishop of Canterbury to Photios and the Patriarch of Antioch, Mathew's group claimed that communion was never formally broken off.

In 1890, the first Western Rite Orthodox community in North America, an Episcopal parish in Green Bay, Wisconsin, pastored by Fr. René Vilatte, was received by Bishop Vladimir Sokolovsky. However, Vilatte was soon ordained a bishop in the Jacobite Church, an Oriental Orthodox Church not in communion with the Eastern Orthodox Church. Other small groups using the Western Rite have been received, but usually have either had little impact or have declared their independence soon after their reception. Western rite parishes were established in Poland in 1926 when a half-dozen congregations were received into Eastern Orthodoxy; however, the movement dwindled during World War II.

==== Orthodox Church of France ====
In 1936, the ROC received a small group led by a former Liberal Catholic bishop, Louis-Charles Winnaert (1880–1937), as the Église Orthodoxe Occidentale (EOO). Winnaert was received as an archimandrite, took the religious name Irénée, and soon died. Winnaert's work was continued, with occasional conflict, by one of his priests, Eugraph Kovalevsky (1905–1970) and Lucien Chambault, the latter of which oversaw a small Orthodox Benedictine community in Paris. After 1946, Kovalevsky began to recreate a Gallican Rite based on the letters of Germain of Paris, a sixth-century bishop of Paris, numerous early Western missals and sacramentaries, and some Byzantine modifications; his development was The divine liturgy of Saint Germanus of Paris.

Archimandrite Alexis van der Mensbrugghe, a former Roman Catholic monk, who taught at the Western Church's St. Denys Theological Institute but remained in the Eastern rite, attempted to restore the ancient Roman rite, replacing medieval accretions with Gallican and Byzantine forms. Eventually, Alexis was consecrated as an ROC bishop in 1960, continuing his Western Rite work under the auspices of the Moscow Patriarchate.

In 1953, pressured by the Russian Orthodox Church to adopt the Eastern rite, the Western Orthodox Church went its own way, changing its name to the Orthodox Church of France. After several years of isolation, the church was recognized as an autonomous Church by Metropolitan Anastasy Gribanovsky of ROCOR and was in communion with ROCOR from 1959 to 1966.

While the Russian Orthodox Church's Western Rite mission withered and ended, ECOF thrived; however, after Maximovich died, Kovalevsky was left without canonical protection until his death in 1970. In 1972, the church found a new canonical superior in the Romanian Orthodox Church. Gilles Bertrand-Hardy was then consecrated as bishop and took the religious name Germain of Saint-Denis. In 1993, after long conflict with the Synod of the Romanian Orthodox Church about alleged canonical irregularities within ECOF, the Romanian Orthodox Church withdrew its blessing of ECOF and broke off communion.

==== North America ====
Saint Tikhon of Moscow's contribution to the Western Rite has been more enduring. While he was bishop of the ROC's diocese in America, some Episcopalians were interested in joining Orthodoxy while retaining Anglican liturgical practices. Tikhon sent the 1892 Book of Common Prayer, enquired about the viability of Orthodox parishes composed of former Anglicans using Anglican liturgical practices. In 1904, the Holy Synod concluded that such parishes were possible and provided a list of doctrinal corrections to the Book of Common Prayer's text of the prayers and rites that were necessary to profess in Orthodox worship. The Holy Synod also concluded that detailed changes in the Book of Common Prayer and in Anglican liturgical practices, together with compilations of new prayers, and entire rites, can only be carried out on location in America and not from Moscow.

The most successful and stable group of Western Rite parishes originated within the Orthodox Church under Bishop Aftimios Ofiesh in the 1930s as part of the American Orthodox Catholic Church. In 1932, Bishop Aftimios consecrated an Episcopal priest, Ignatius Nichols, as auxiliary Bishop of Washington and assigned him to the Western Rite parishes. However, due to complaints from Episcopalians that the Episcopal Church was the "American" Orthodox Church, the American Orthodox Church that Aftimios and Nicholas were a part of became estranged from what would become the Orthodox Church in America (OCA). The subsequent marriages of both Aftimios and Nichols violated Orthodox canon law, and they left the church and its subsidiaries without canonical recognition.

In 1932, Nichols founded the Society of Clerks Secular of Saint Basil as a devotional society for clergy and laity dedicated to the celebration of the Western Rite. Nichols also consecrated Alexander Turner as a bishop in 1939. Turner pastored a small parish in Mount Vernon until Nichols' death in 1947, when he assumed leadership of the Society and concluded that there was no future for the Society of Saint Basil outside of canonical E. Orthodoxy. Turner described the situation the Society found itself in by saying:

It was [...] during the tempestuous days following the Bolshevik Revolution that the Society had its inception as a missionary organ of the nascent federation of American Orthodox colonies under Russian suzerainty, though of local Syrian administration. With the collapse of that plan and the submission of the ethnic groups to the churches of their homelands, the Society was left in isolation.

Through Father Paul Schneirla, he began unofficial dialogue with Metropolitan Antony Bashir. Even before this, Turner had been promoting Western Rite Orthodoxy through his periodical Orthodoxy. In 1961, the Society (consisting of three parishes) was received into the Syrian Antiochian Archdiocese on the basis of Metropolitan Antony's 1958 edict. Upon reception, Bishop Alexander Turner became a canonical priest of the Antiochian Orthodox Church, guiding the group as Vicar-General until his death in 1971, thereafter he was succeeded by Schneirla. However, after Turner's death, the sole surviving Basilian, William Francis Forbes, returned to the American Orthodox Catholic Church and was consecrated a bishop in October 1974.

Besides the original communities associated with the Society, a number of other parishes have been received into the Western Rite Vicariate of the Antiochian Archdiocese, particularly as elements within the Episcopal Church became dissatisfied with liturgical change and the ordination of women. The first Episcopal parish to be received into the AWRV was the Episcopal Church of the Incarnation in Detroit, Michigan.

==== Current status in the Russian Orthodox Church Outside Russia ====
On July 10, 2013, the recognition and status of Western Rite parishes within ROCOR seemed to change significantly. The Synod of Bishops of ROCOR, presided over by its First Hierarch, decreed that:

- ROCOR would no longer ordain clergy for Western Rite parishes.
- Bishop Jerome Shaw of Manhattan would be censured for unapproved ecclesiastical services and forcibly retired without the right to perform ordinations.
- Some ordinations performed by Shaw would not be recognized, and those candidates would be thoroughly examined before regularization.
- A commission would examine how to integrate Western Rite clergy and communities into the Russian Orthodox Church.
- Western Rite clergy and communities need to adopt the order of divine services of the Orthodox-catholic Church, but may preserve "certain particularities of the Western Rite".
- Adherence to the rules and traditions of the Russian Orthodox Church in particular is required.

The Russian Orthodox Church Outside of Russia established a working commission to deal with the peculiarities that led to decision of July 2013. Within the following year there was established a new leadership structure that eventually led to the establishment of a revitalized Western Rite Vicariate under the Omophorion of His Eminence Metropolitan Hilarion. New Western Rite parishes and monasteries continue to be founded by ROCOR and priests, deacons and subdeacons within the Western Rite continue to be ordained from 2014 to the present, including in Sweden and the United States. After the death of Metropolitan Hilarion in 2022, a pastoral letter was issued by the Synod of ROCOR, promising their continued care to the ROCOR Western Rite communities.

==== Orthodox Church in America ====
Mention of the Western Rite was often made in the OCA, the most prominent being a mention during a speech by the primate of the OCA, Metropolitan Jonah Paffhausen, in April 2009.

On September 8, 2018, the Orthodox Church of America established a Western Rite mission parish in Alberta, Canada. However, in 2024, the parish's jurisdiction was transferred to the Antiochian Archdiocese, as its rector was granted a canonical release in September. As of 2025, there are no OCA parishes in which the Western Rite is in use.

==== Independent Western Orthodox churches and monasteries ====
There are a number of independent Western Orthodox congregations and monasteries.

== Notable figures ==
Important figures in the history of the Orthodox West Rite include Julian Joseph Overbeck, Fr. Michael Keiser, and Saints John Maximovitch, and Tikhon of Moscow, the Patron Saint of the Orthodox Western Rite. Another prominent figure is Fr. Dennis Chambault of Paris, a reputed wonderworker and healer, whom many regard as a saint.

== Liturgy ==
Western Rite parishes do not all utilize the same liturgy, but often use a particular liturgy depending upon their individual affiliations prior to entering Eastern Orthodoxy. At present, there are different liturgies available to Western Rite parishes:

- The Divine Liturgy of Saint Tikhon – this liturgy is currently used by some churches of the AWRV.
- The Divine Liturgy of Saint Gregory – used by some churches of the AWRV.
- The English Liturgy – the Russian adaptation of the 1549 Book of Common Prayer according to the criteria set forth by the Holy Synod of Russia in 1907. This liturgy has been augmented with material from the Sarum Missal, the Gothic Missal, the York rite, and the 1718 Scottish Non-Juror liturgy. An epiclesis from the Gothic Missal is included. This liturgy is not the same rite as the Liturgy of Saint Tikhon, and the two rites differ in many respects.
- The Liturgy according to Saint Germanus – used by the Orthodox-Catholic Church of France, the French Orthodox Church, and the Orthodox Church of the Gauls.
- The Glastonbury Rite – the Glastonbury Rite was at one time used in the Catholicate of the West.

The Western Orthodox rites allowed in Eastern Orthodoxy are the Divine Liturgy of Saint Tikhon and the Divine Liturgy of Saint Gregory.

In France, Bishop Alexis van der Mensbrugghe, of the ROC, published a missal in 1962 which contained his restored Gallican rite and his restored pre-Celestinian Italic rite. Neither of Mensbrugghe's restored rites are used by Eastern Orthodox groups.

=== Liturgical development ===
Meyendorff, Schmemann, and Schneirla were already familiar with the Western Rite both from having been in contact with members of the ECOF while teaching at Saint Sergius Theological Institute. Schmemann actively followed the Liturgical Movement in the Roman Catholic and Anglican Church and was an advocate for renewal of the Orthodox liturgy.

=== Liturgical books ===
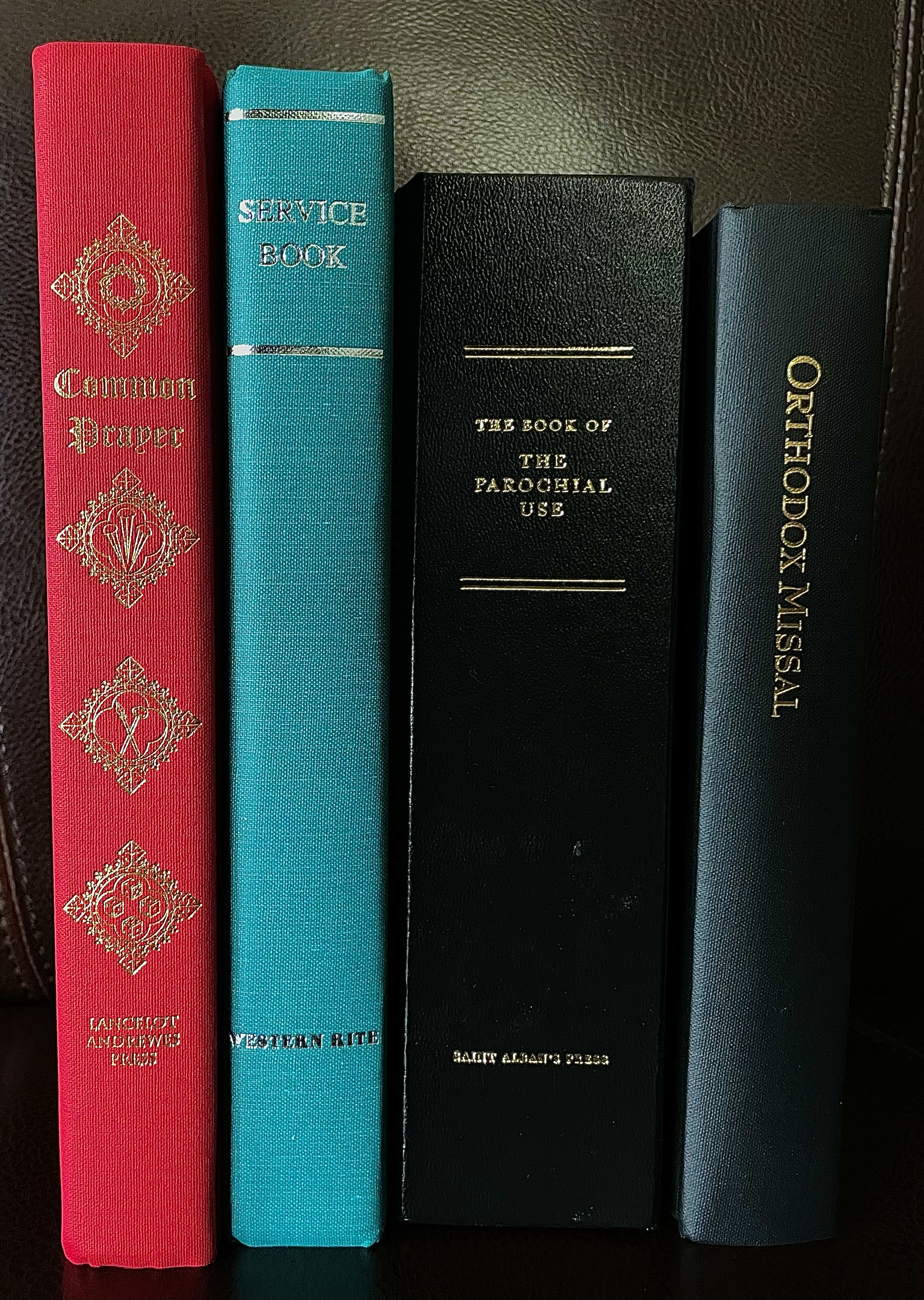
Examples of Western Rite Orthodox liturgical books from several groups

Officially, the AWRV provides one liturgical book, Orthodox Missal, which contains both the Liturgy of Saint Tikhon and the Liturgy of Saint Gregory, with appropriate propers for seasons, feasts, saints, and prayers before and after Mass. The Antiochian Archdiocese publishes the Saint Andrew Service Book (SASB), also known as The Western Rite Service Book, which was developed by Saint Michael's Church in California under the leadership of the late Father Michael Trigg; the 1996 second and 2005 third editions of the SASB received official sanction from Metropolitan Philip Saliba, with the latter containing explicit reference to the authorized nature of all previous editions of the SASB. In addition to duplicating the contents of The Orthodox Missal, the SASB also includes forms for Matins and Vespers, the Benediction of the Blessed Sacrament, and the threefold Amen common to the Byzantine epiclesis but absent in The Orthodox Missal. The SASB was produced by the Antiochian Archdiocese without the participation of the AWRV.

Parishes within the AWRV are permitted to use either the Liturgy of Saint Tikhon or that of Saint Gregory. While most parishes use the Tikhonite liturgy, several use the Gregorian liturgy on weekdays or on specific Sundays of the year. Presently, there is no breviary specifically designed for the Orthodox Western Rite, though priests of the AWRV who celebrate the Liturgy of Saint Gregory are expected to pray as much of the Breviarium Monasticum as possible, in the Anglican Breviary.

Also in common use within the AWRV, though not officially approved, are St. Dunstan's Plainsong Psalter, The English Office Noted, and the St. Ambrose Hymnal.

=== Publishing houses ===
Lancelot Andrewes Press is the publishing arm of the Fellowship of Saint Dunstan and publishes material which is utilized by congregations and individuals in Western rites. The primary mission of Lancelot Andrewes Press is to publish material for the "advancement of historic Christian orthodoxy, as expressed by the liturgical and devotional usages of traditional English Christianity."

=== Devotional societies ===
There are also devotional societies within the AWRV:

- The Orthodox Christian Society of Our Lady of Walsingham – dedicated to encouragement of devotion to the Theotokos, particularly under the title of Our Lady of Walsingham (and the preservation of the replica of the shrine of Walsingham).

=== Parishes and missions ===
Parishes and missions belonging to the Western Rite can be found in a number of Orthodox jurisdictions. The single largest group of such communities is to be found within the Orthodox Church of France, followed by jurisdictions of the Eastern Orthodox Church, and the Communion of Western Orthodox Churches. There are also parishes and missions belonging to the Old Calendarist tradition.

=== Canonical missionary societies ===
These groups are Canonical missionary societies with a core of canonical Orthodox laity served by Eastern Orthodox clergy within the Eastern Orthodox Church with the goal of future reception of converts into the Western Rite of Orthodoxy.

- Saint Brendan OSS – Panama City Florida – ROCOR

== Criticisms ==
Metropolitan Kallistos Ware considered Western Rite Orthodoxy inherently divisive, believing that following different liturgical traditions from their neighboring Byzantine Rite Eastern Orthodox Christians meant they did not share liturgical unity with them and presented an unfamiliar face to the majority of Eastern Orthodox Christians. Ware was particularly concerned about the further fragmentation of Eastern Orthodoxy in non-Eastern Orthodox countries, in this case, in Great Britain.

The priest Alexander Schmemann said in an article from 1958 that debates about establishing a Western Rite in Eastern Orthodoxy risked distracting from what he saw as a deeper need for the Eastern Orthodox Church to rediscover the meaning of its own liturgical life. He maintained that making a Western liturgy suitable for use by the Eastern Orthodox was not possible by only correcting texts, because the liturgy expresses the church's faith and experience together instead of as a set of isolated ceremonies.

== See also ==
- Eastern Orthodox Church organization
- Western Christianity
- Eastern Catholic Churches
