= American Orthodox Catholic Church =

Christian denomination, founded 1927

- Emblem
- Abbreviation: AOCC
- Type: Eastern Christian
- Classification: Independent Eastern Orthodox
- Scripture: Septuagint, New Testament
- Theology: Orthodox theology, Palamism, Hesychasm, Clerical marriage
- Polity: Episcopal
- Governance: Holy Synod of the American Orthodox Catholic Church
- Patriarch: Disputed
- Region: North America, South America
- Language: English, Church Slavonic, Spanish, Russian, Irish, German, Arabic, Latin, Italian, Koine Greek, Modern Greek, other vernacular languages
- Liturgy: Byzantine and Western
- Founder: Aftimios Ofiesh
- Origin: 1927; New York, N.Y., United States
- Branched from: Orthodox Church in America
- Separations: American World Patriarchs
- Parishes: 17 (2001)
- Members: 4,138 (2001)
- Clergy: 9 (2001)

The American Orthodox Catholic Church (AOCC), or The Holy Eastern Orthodox Catholic and Apostolic Church in North America (THEOCACNA), and sometimes simply the American Orthodox Patriarchate (AOP), is an independent Eastern Orthodox Christian church with origins from 1924 to 1927.

The church was formally created on February 2, 1927, and chartered in the U.S. state of Massachusetts in 1928 with the assistance of Metropolitan Platon Rozhdestvensky of New York; the American Orthodox Catholic Church was initially led by Archbishop Aftimios Ofiesh before his disputed suspension and deposition in 1933. The original incarnation of the American Orthodox Catholic Church maintained communication with the remainder of mainstream Eastern Orthodoxy until the death of Sophronios Beshara.

The purpose of the American Orthodox Catholic Church was to establish a new tradition in North America separate from any other particular ethnic or cultural traditions. It operated in the United States of America with initial support from the Russian Orthodox Greek Catholic Church in America, until Ofiesh assumed autocephaly and direct jurisdiction over the Russian Orthodox Greek Catholic Church in America, the Antiochian Archdiocese, Greek Orthodox Archdiocese of America, and others.

The American Orthodox Catholic Church became the first attempted autocephalous Eastern Orthodox Christian jurisdiction for North America, though—according to an account in mainstream Eastern Orthodoxy—it was originally intended to function as a diocese of the Russian Orthodox Greek Catholic Church in America (today the Orthodox Church in America). This account has been contested by claimant successors, citing deliberate autonomy and autocephaly.

The American Orthodox Catholic Church originally functioned as an archbishopric before elevation to the patriarchate, and the Secretary of the Commonwealth of Massachusetts had recognized its continued existence in 2009 under Archbishop Victor Prentice although additional claimant successors have existed; another prominent claimed successor is the American Orthodox Catholic Church (American Patriarchate), led by Patriarch Roger Paul Willingham and Archbishop Wayne Daniels Jr.

== History ==
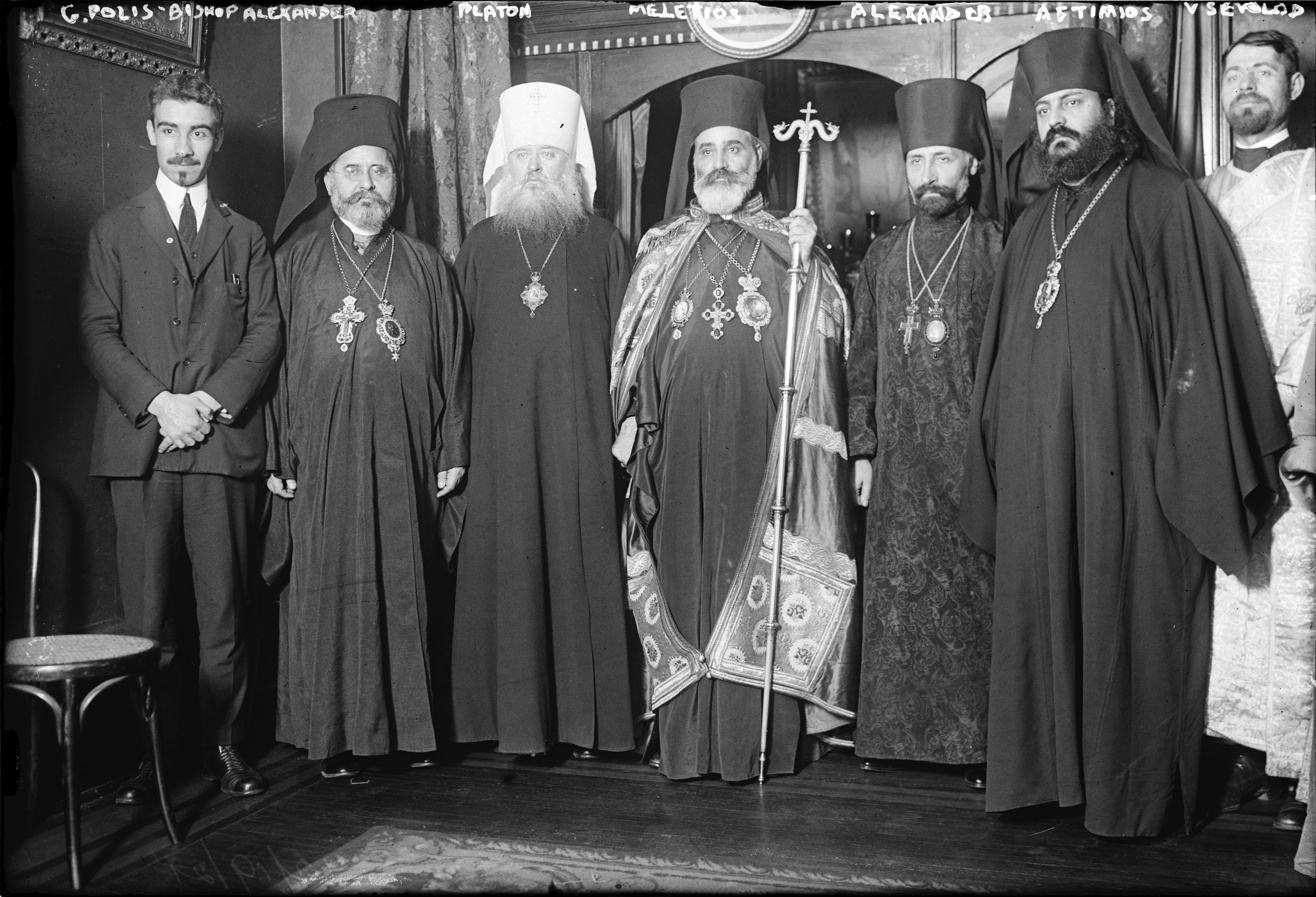
Bishop Aftimios Ofiesh (second right) with the 1921 pan-Orthodox gathering of bishops

=== Establishment ===
Aftimios Ofiesh officially founded the American Orthodox Catholic Church in 1927 with assistance from Metropolitan Platon; it was incorporated as The Holy Eastern Orthodox Catholic and Apostolic Church in North America. According to an account from the future-Orthodox Church in America, the Russian Orthodox Greek Catholic Church in America (ROGCCA) originally supported the establishment of the North American Orthodox jurisdiction as a diocese intended to spread Eastern Orthodox Christianity throughout non-Russian American communities. Another account noted the American Orthodox Catholic Church's foundation as an autonomous and autocephalous, multi-ethnic church.

At its inception, on February 2, 1927, Metropolitan Platon pointed out that this church, "completely autonomous and independent in its organization, constitution, administration, jurisdiction and authority, should at all times preserve its fraternal and filial attitude to the Orthodox Church of Russia, represented in Russia by the authority of the Moscow and All Russia Patriarchate, and in America by Metropolitan Platon and his canonically established and recognized successors—the Archbishops of the American jurisdiction of the Patriarchate of Moscow and All Russia." The document was signed by Metropolitan Platon, Archbishop Ofiesh, bishops Theophilus Pashkovsky, Amphilochius Vakulsky, Arseny Chagovets and Alexius Panteleev.

Within four years, the American Orthodox Catholic Church consecrated four bishops with the charter granted from the Russian Orthodox Greek Catholic Church in America. After the consecration of the four bishops, its formal members developed a constitution for the new Orthodox church. This constitution referred to the church as "autonomous" yet also "autocephalous."

=== Open hostility ===
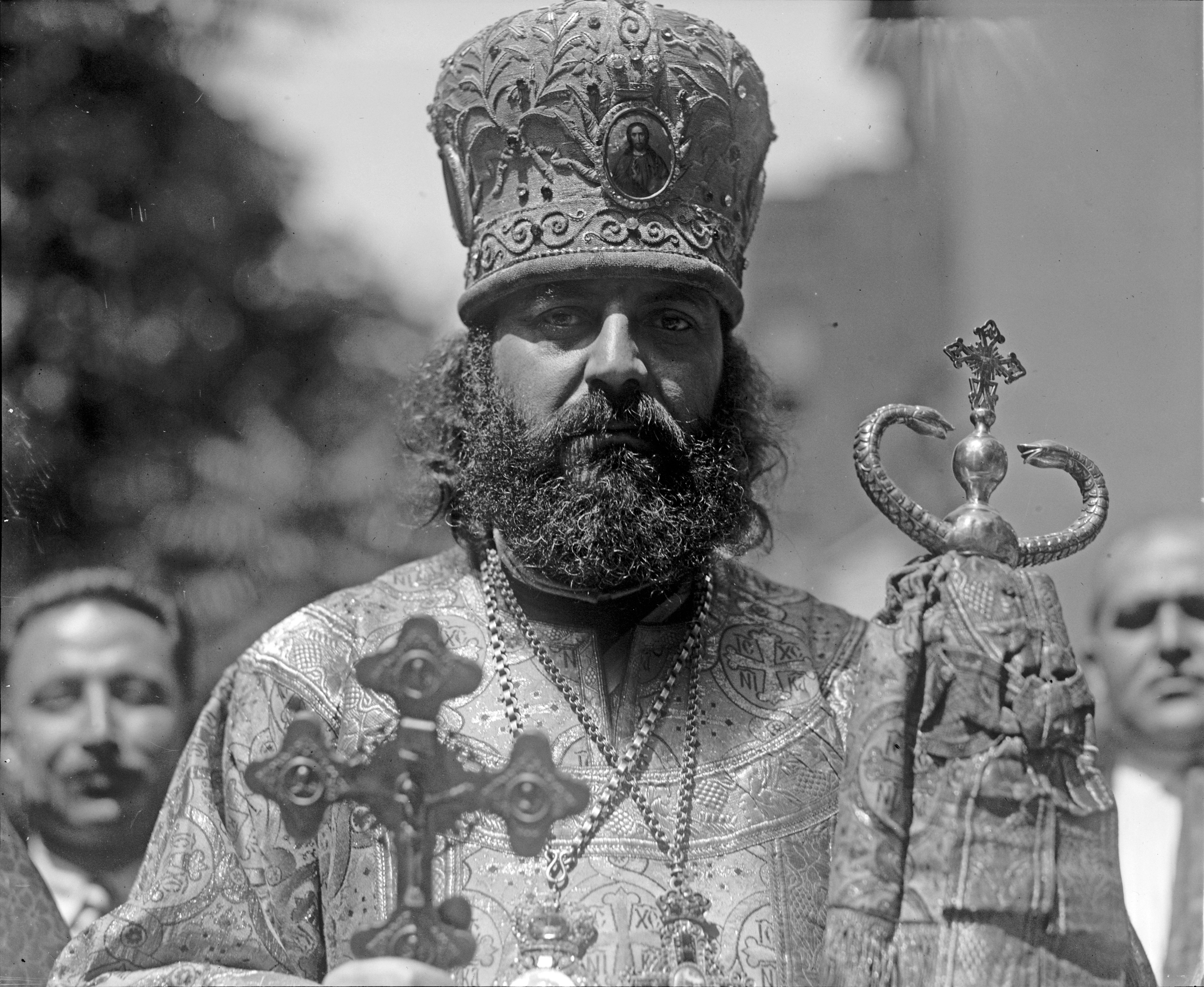
Aftimios Ofiesh in 1922

The establishment of the church inspired a reactionary movement against it; at that time, the Russian Orthodox Church Outside Russia (ROCOR) still viewed itself as the ROGCCA's rightful canonical authority. On March 31, 1927, the Synod of Bishops of the ROCOR decided to release Metropolitan Platon from the administration of the North American diocese and prohibit him from serving within its area. The reasons for this were that Metropolitan Platon—who was appointed to put things in order in North America—further confused them.

On April 1, 1927, the Synod of Bishops of ROCOR sent a message to the faithful in North America, where Metropolitan Platon was accused of disobedience to the synod, of rebellion, and of the collapse of the affairs of the diocese. On September 8, 1927, Metropolitan Platon was finally banned from the priesthood, the divine services performed by him were recognized as ungrateful, and the ordinations were not recognized as canonical.

In accordance with the letters of Patriarch Gregory of Antioch dated April 25, 1923, Patriarch Tikhon dated January 17, 1922, as well as the resolution of the Council of Bishops of the ROCOR of 1923, Archbishop Aftimios was considered under the authority of the Greek Orthodox Patriarchate of Antioch, although he was transferred to the Russian Orthodox missions with the assistance of Metropolitan Arsenios Haddad. At the same time, they pointed out that Aftimios should be considered a bishop, and not an archbishop, since they believed he received this rank illegally from Metropolitan Platon, who had no right to award hierarchs. The new holy synod—headed by Ofiesh—was recognized as non-canonical.

Aftimios replied forcefully, denouncing the Russian Orthodox Church Outside Russia for their actions and forbade his clergy and faithful from having anything to do with them. Like his estranged former associates in ROCOR, ROGCCA Metropolitan Platon turned his back on the American Orthodox Catholic Church citing lack of loyalty. The ROGCCA's blessing for the consecration of Fr. Leonid Turkevich was also withdrawn. Others began to doubt Platon's support of the new church primarily because of publications in the Orthodox Catholic Review (edited by Hieromonk Boris and Priest Michael) that were aimed at the Episcopal Church USA.

To worsen matters, the Greek Orthodox Church of Antioch sent Archbishop Victor (Abo-Assaley) of New York to America in 1924, where he encouraged Orthodox Arabs to come under Antiochian jurisdiction rather than under the Russians or the new American Church. Despite his efforts, he did not make much headway in his endeavors.

To counteract Archbishop Victor's actions, Aftimios and his group began to focus on the establishment of the church's legal status. For a while, the American Orthodox Catholic Church enjoyed some success. In May 1928, Sophronios Beshara was consecrated as Bishop of Los Angeles. He was given responsibility for all territory west of the Mississippi River and for parishes who still considered themselves to be under the jurisdiction of the Russian Orthodox Greek Catholic Church in America. However, the success did not last. It was expected that with its first bishops, they would achieve a solid foundation, but this did not happen.

By 1929, Aftimios attempted to gain Greek Archbishop Alexander Demoglou's support for the new church. Demoglou was the first primate of the newly formed Greek Orthodox Archdiocese of America. His response was that he had authority over not only all of the Greek Orthodox in America, but also over all Orthodox Christians in America. Aftimios ordained Reverend Demetrius Cassis, an American of Greek parentage, for the new American Orthodox Catholic Church; in 1928, the Ecumenical Patriarchate of Constantinople and Orthodox Church of Greece rejected the American Orthodox Catholic Church as a canonical institution.

In The Quest for Orthodox Church Unity in America, Fr. Serafim believes that Aftimios's opposition to the new church had shifted from reservation to optimism. Fr. Serafim claims this shift in Aftimios's emotions because of a letter dated October 4, 1929 where Aftimios declared that:

"His Eminence, the Most Reverend Platon (Rozhdestvensky), the Metropolitan of Khersson and Odessa, has no proper, valid, legal, or effective appointment, credentials or authority to rule the North American Archdiocese of the Russian Orthodox Church in any capacity. Such being the case it follows that from the departure of His Eminence Archbishop Alexander Nemolovsky that the lawful and canonical ruling headship of the Archdiocese of the Aleutian Islands and North America in the Patriarchal Russian Church has naturally been vested in the First Vicar and Senior Bishop in this Jurisdiction" therefore "the title and position of 'Metropolitan of North America and Canada' has no canonical existence in the Russian Church." It is signed by "Aftimios, First Vicar and Senior Bishop in the Archdiocese of the Aleutian Islands and North America."

Undoubtedly, Aftimios wrote the letter following Platon's recent opposition, although another account upheld that he assumed Platon had already given him authority over all Orthodox Christians in North America. Fr. Serafim continues by saying that Aftimios's denunciation of Platon's authority barely affected the Russian parishes or their clergy; he also believed the reason for Aftimios's denunciation was that Platon would continue to rule the archdiocese until a bishop was sent to relieve him, even though the Ukaz of Patriarch Tikhon suspended Platon.

Despite some troubles, Aftimios continued to explore new opportunities. He began negotiations to bring Bp. Fan Noli to serve as a bishop in the new American body, with jurisdiction over Albanian Orthodox Christians. Though Bp. Fan did eventually come to the United States, it was under the auspices of the ROGCCA. Aftimios continued his attempts to boost the legitimacy of his jurisdiction.

Around October 1930, Aftimios sent a letter to his clergy indicating that they ought to keep their distance from Bp. Germanos Shehadi of Zahle who had come from Antioch, without the Antiochian Orthodox Church's authorization, to gather funds from Arabic Orthodox parishes and to encourage such parishes to come under Antioch's jurisdiction. While in the U.S., Bp. Germanos accepted Archpriest Basil Kherbawi under his omophorion. Kherbawi had previously been suspended by Abp. Aftimios for disloyalty.

In 1931, Aftimios wrote a letter inviting the Ecumenical Patriarchate of Constantinople to assert jurisdiction over the United States. He also requested for Archbishop Athenagoras Spyrou—later the Ecumenical Patriarch of Constantinople—to assume presidency over the American Orthodox Catholic Church.

=== Disintegration ===
In 1932, Aftimios's cathedral was taken from him and given over to the ROGCCA by a decision of a New York State court. The charter stated that the cathedral could only be used by a hierarch subject to the authority of the Russian Church. Nevertheless, Aftimios consecrated two more bishops, Ignatius Nichols (a former Episcopal cleric who had become an Old Catholic episcopus vagans), and Joseph Zuk of New Jersey. Zuk had ties to the Ukrainians, who had the allegiance of a half dozen parishes.

Aftimios's discouragement over the state of his jurisdiction is believed the cause to make the decision that is known to the Eastern Orthodox Church as the death-knell for the American Orthodox Catholic Church:

"...on the 29th of April 1933 Abp Aftimios, in defiance of all Orthodox Tradition and Canon Law... married in a civil ceremony to a young Evangelical Syrian girl born in America [she was actually a member of the Syrian Orthodox parish in Wilkes-Barre, Pennsylvania]—and despite all the efforts of responsible parties, he refused to resign as Archbishop of the new Church."

The two new bishops of the church, Ignatius and Joseph, voiced their support of Aftimios's marriage. In previous traditions and cultures, bishops were not allowed to marry, but since the new church is separate from any other particular ethnic or cultural traditions, they acknowledged Aftimios's decision as courageous.

Three days after Aftimios's wedding, Ignatius and Joseph held a synod meeting by themselves. Since they believed that Aftimios had resigned, they elected Joseph as the new President Archbishop of the American Orthodox Catholic Church during the meeting. Ignatius was designated his successor. Serafim Surrency observes that these leadership complications eventually undermined any authority the church may have still had. Fr. Andrew Stephen Damick largely blames the multiple consecrations by Ignatius as another complication. By the summer of 1933, only six parishes remained in the American Orthodox Catholic Church.

Joseph later denied making the agreement that Ignatius would be his successor. His denial was not very significant because he was already sick. Joseph died soon after, on February 23, 1934. Ignatius then got married in June 1933 and began forming ecumenical relations with the representatives of the Living Church in America. The Living Church had been competing with the ROGCCA and ROCOR. He eventually broke relations with the Living Church and returned to being an episcopus vagans. Before his death, Joseph started multiple small religious bodies, many of whom claim apostolic succession from him. He became the first bishop of the Ukrainian Orthodox Church of the USA and died as the pastor of a small community church in Middle Springs, Vermont.

The only bishop left to the American Orthodox Catholic Church was Sophronios Beshara, who then appealed to Platon for assistance. He had also intended to contact Emmanuel Abo-Hatab, but Emmanuel died on May 29, 1933. Despite his challenges, Bishop Sophronios embraced his new position as 'President Locum Tenens of the American Holy Synod.' Bishop Sophronios hoped to use his new position to mend relations with Metr. Platon and to be viewed as an equal authority within the Eastern Orthodox Church. Beshara, alongside Noli, also became of the consecrators for Christopher Contogeorge, who would later serve in the Greek Orthodox Archdiocese of America and as exarch of the Greek Orthodox Church of Alexandria.

By this point, Platon was focused on the arrival of the representative of the Patriarchate from Russia, Bishop Benjamin Fedchenkov. Fedchenkov's purpose in the United States was to investigate the ecclesiastical status of Orthodox America. Due to the new church's lack of support, the remaining priests and parishes joined other authorities or became members of the independent sacramental movement; many churches in the ISM self-identified as the American Orthodox Catholic Church. Hieromonk Boris and Priest Michael were received back into the authority of Moscow and the ROGCCA.

Later in 1933, the formal "Removal from Office and Suspencion" of Aftimios was officially done on 7 October 1933 in his capacity as president locum tenens. Later Sophronios then wrote a deposition letter on Ignatius Nichols on 2 November 1933; and by 1936, Ignatius Nichols would establish the Holy Orthodox Church in America with George Winslow Plummer. Nichols would later be the consecrator for Alexander Turner, one of the founders of the Antiochian Western Rite Vicariate.

Sophronios still refused to submit to Platon or Benjamin from the Moscow Patriarchate. The American Orthodox Catholic Church in its original form remained dormant when Sophronios died in 1934 in Los Angeles. Serafim Surrency gives the date of his death as 1934, but his gravestone reads 1940. He is now buried at the Antiochian Village in Pennsylvania alongside St. Raphael of Brooklyn and Emmanuel Abo-Hatab.

The remaining AOCC churches and clergy moved between different mainstream Eastern Orthodox jurisdictions or remained independent. Through one continuation, another church known as the American World Patriarchates would be established in the mid-20th century.

=== Continuation ===
A notable continuation of the church is the jurisdiction trademarked as "The Holy Eastern Orthodox Catholic and Apostolic Church in North America, Inc." This continuation claimed to have been "held in locum tenens due to lack of clergy" and Ofiesh's widow served on the corporate board until 1999. In 2009, this church was recognized by the Secretary of the Commonwealth of Massachusetts as the original American Orthodox Catholic Church. This continuation claimed 9 clergy, 17 churches, and 4,138 members in 2001. Regarding its relationship with mainstream Eastern Orthodoxy, the church "do[es] not recognize any SCOBA church due to the schism they created in 1929 that continues today."

Another continuation of the church, known as the "American Orthodox Catholic Church (American Patriarchate)", was incorporated in Delaware. This continuation claimed 277 churches and approximately 3,500 members as of 2025. It has maintained intercommunion with another claimant successor known as the "American Orthodox Church/North American Orthodox Church". As of 2024, its patriarch—Roger Paul Willingham—consecrated retired U.S. Army lieutenant colonel and chaplain Virgil ("Brett") Travis of Emmaus Cathedral. This continuation disputed the AOCC's post-1933 dormancy and claims to have preserved the historic episcopate in response to the mainstream Eastern Orthodox, by upholding sacramental character.

In June 2026, Archbishop Wayne Danels Jr., Father Don Purdum, and other clergy under Willingham's continuation attended an ecumenical prayer service with a priest from the Greek Orthodox Archdiocese of America; and Daniels was invited to teach at this ecumenical event. There were claims from the Greek Orthodox host-priest that these American Orthodox Catholic clergy were in the process of formal reception under the Ecumenical Patriarchate of Constantinople by chrismation, although one cleric from this continuation of the American Orthodox Catholic Church denied these claims and stated: "We’re simply not going to do that because we don't need to do that. We need no validation from any other entity [...] We’re not going under the Greek or Russian thumb through chrismation—I call it cremation." According to AOCC Bishop Travis, Patriarch Willingham, Archbishop Daniels, and Greek Orthodox Archbishop Elpidophoros met in person, and engaged in dialogue for approximately 5 years.

In July 2026, Willingham, Daniels, and other AOCC bishops unanimously stated—in contrast to a previous statement by one of its bishops, that: "The AOCC is willingly and actively engaged in direct communication with GOARCH concerning our reconciliation with the Church following a thorough canonical, pastoral, and administrative process. These conversations are being conducted in a spirit of mutual respect, openness, and Christian charity."

In November 2026, the American Orthodox Catholic Church (American Patriarchate) submitted documents to the Greek Orthodox Archdiocese of America for reconciliation, unity, and communion.
