= Benedictine Rite =

Form of Mass and Liturgy

The Benedictine Rite is the particular form of Mass and Liturgy celebrated by the Benedictine Order, as based on the writings of St. Benedict on the topic.

== Mass ==
The Benedictine Order never had a rite of its own celebrating Mass. Since the reform of Pope Pius V (see Quo primum), it always uses the Roman Rite of Mass; earlier, its monks often used local rites, as did those who served the cathedral of Durham.

== Liturgy of the Hours ==
The Order has always had its own form of celebrating the Liturgy of the Hours, in accordance with what was called the Breviarium Monasticum.

The founder, St. Benedict devotes thirteen chapters (8-20) of his rule to regulating the canonical hours for his monks (and nuns). Chapter 18 specifies how they should pray the psalms:

In What Order the Psalms Are to Be Said

Let this verse be said: "Incline unto my aid, O God; O Lord, make haste to help me," and the "Glory be to the Father" then the hymn proper to each Hour.

Then at Prime on Sunday four sections of Psalm 118 are to be said; and at each of the remaining Hours, that is Terce, Sext and None, three sections of the same Psalm 118.

At Prime on Monday let three Psalms be said, namely Psalms 1, 2 and 6. And so each day at Prime until Sunday let three Psalms be said in numerical order, to Psalm 19, but with Psalms 9 and 17 each divided into two parts. Thus it comes about that the Night Office on Sunday always begins with Psalm 20.

At Terce, Sext and None on Monday let the nine remaining sections of Psalm 118 be said, three at each of these Hours.

Psalm 118 having been completed, therefore, on two days, Sunday and Monday, let the nine Psalms from Psalm 119 to Psalm 127 be said at Terce, Sext and None, three at each Hour, beginning with Tuesday. And let these same Psalms be repeated every day until Sunday at the same Hours, while the arrangement of hymns, lessons and versesis kept the same on all days; and thus Prime on Sunday will always begin with Psalm 118.

Vespers are to be sung with four Psalms every day. These shall begin with Psalm 109 and go on to Psalm 147, omitting those which are set apart for other Hours; that is to say that with the exception of Psalms 117 to 127 and Psalms 133 and 142, all the rest of these are to be said at Vespers. And since there are three Psalms too few, let the longer ones of the above number be divided, namely Psalms 138, 143 and 144. But let Psalm 116 because of its brevity be joined to Psalm 115.

The order of the Vesper Psalms being thus settled, let the rest of the Hour - lesson, responsory, hymn, verse and canticle - be carried out as we prescribed above.

At Compline the same Psalms are to be repeated every day, namely Psalms 4, 90 and 133.

The order of psalmody for the day Hours being thus arranged, let all the remaining Psalms be equally distributed among the seven Night Offices by dividing the longer Psalms among them and assigning twelve Psalms to each night.

We strongly recommend, however, that if this distribution of the Psalms is displeasing to anyone, he/she should arrange them otherwise, in whatever way she/he considers better, but taking care in any case that the Psalter with its full number of 150 Psalms be chanted every week and begun again every Sunday at the Night Office. For those monastics show themselves too lazy in the service to which they are vowed, who chant less than the Psalter with the customary canticles in the course of a week, whereas we read that our holy Fathers strenuously fulfilled that task in a single day. May we, lukewarm that we are, perform it at least in a whole week!

However, after the Second Vatican Council and the promulgation of the new Liturgy of the Hours, each monastery has the right to make his own monastic liturgy under the guidelines of the Thesaurus Liturgiae Horarum Monasticae (1977) which allows the usage of a different psalter order than Saint Benedict's or the retention of the canonical hour of Prime which was suppressed by Sacrosanctum Concilium.

== Influence ==
The Psalter in the Breviarium Monasticum formed the basis of most forms of the Liturgy of the Hours until the Reform of the Roman Breviary by Pope Pius X in 1911.

Benedictines may not substitute the Roman Liturgy of the Hours for the Monastic Breviary, because their obligation is to say the longer monastic form. In fact, the Benedictine Liturgy of the Hours would occupy some four to five hours of a monk's day; with gradual and sometimes intense elaboration, the daily office at one point grew to where it was absorbing an astonishing ten to twelve hours, especially on the most important feasts. Reform was, obviously, a frequent refrain in those orders who split away from traditional Benedictine monasticism.

== See also ==
- Rule of Saint Benedict
