= Julian Joseph Overbeck =

Clergyman (1821–1905)

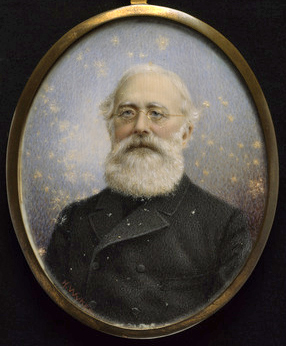
Julian Joseph Overbeck

Julian Joseph Overbeck (24 Apr 1821–1905) was a Roman Catholic priest who converted to Eastern Orthodoxy and became a pioneer of Western Rite Orthodoxy.

== Life and career ==
The modern re-emergence of an Orthodox Western Rite begins in 1864 with the work of Overbeck, a former Catholic priest. Overbeck had left the priesthood, converted to Lutheranism and married, though it is uncertain whether he ever functioned as a Lutheran pastor. He immigrated to England in 1863 to become professor of German at the Royal Military Academy, where he also undertook studies of the Church of England and Orthodoxy. Convinced that both the papacy and Anglicanism were on the verge of collapse, Overbeck was received into the Orthodox Church at the Russian Embassy in London by Fr. Eugene Poppoff in 1865 as a layman because he had married after his ordination.

Overbeck had also begun to convince others of the feasibility of a Western Orthodox church and was ultimately able to submit a petition of 122 signatures (mostly Tractarians) to the Holy Synod in 1869 to ask for the creation of a Western rite. A synodical commission was established to investigate the question, and Overbeck was invited to state his case before the commission in St. Petersburg in 1870. Overbeck's idea received the approval of the commission, and he was instructed to present a revised Western liturgy for evaluation by the commission, which he did in December that year and it was subsequently approved.

By 1876, Overbeck began to make appeals to other Orthodox churches for their recognition of his scheme. He received audiences with the Patriarch of Constantinople, Joachim III, and received recognition from the patriarch of the theoretical right of Western Christians to have a Western Orthodox church. However, Overbeck's efforts did not result in the establishment of Western Orthodoxy. He attributed that failing to the hesitance of the Greeks in London (and the Church of Greece generally) to grant approval because of the "newness and importance" of the question and because the Greeks may have feared taking the wrong step and compromising themselves. The Orthodox Catholic Review published its final issue in 1885, and Overbeck died in 1905 without seeing the implementation of a Western Orthodox church. Georges Florovsky summed up Overbeck's experience in this way: "it was not just a fantastic dream. The question raised by Overbeck was pertinent, even if his own answer to it was confusedly conceived. And probably the vision of Overbeck was greater than his personal interpretation."
