= African-American Catholic Congregation =

Founded 1989 by George Augustus Stallings, Jr.

- Emblem of the AACC
- Abbreviation: AACC
- Classification: Western Christian
- Orientation: Independent Catholic
- Scripture: Catholic Bible
- Theology: Catholic theology; Clerical marriage; Religious syncretism
- Polity: Episcopal
- Archbishop: George Augustus Stallings Jr.
- Language: English
- Liturgy: Zaire Use
- Headquarters: Hillcrest Heights, Maryland
- Founder: George Augustus Stallings Jr.
- Origin: 1989; Washington, D.C., U.S.
- Separated from: Catholic Church in the United States
- Congregations: 7 (2000)
- Official website: http://www.imanitempleaacc.org/

The African-American Catholic Congregation (AACC) is an Independent Catholic church based in the United States. It was founded by Archbishop George Augustus Stallings—an Afrocentrist and former Catholic priest, in Washington, D.C. Stallings left the Catholic Church in 1989 and was officially excommunicated in 1990.

Formerly headquartered in Washington, D.C. at the Imani Temple African-American Catholic Congregation, in 2014, the mother church decided to relocate to nearby Prince George's County, Maryland; their current headquarters are located in Hillcrest Heights, Maryland. As of 2000, the African-American Catholic Congregation had 6 additional Imani Temples spread throughout Richmond, Virginia; Baltimore, Maryland; University City, Pennsylvania; New Orleans, Louisiana; Los Angeles, California; and Nigeria. In 1990, it had another Imani Temple in Norfolk, Virginia.

== History ==
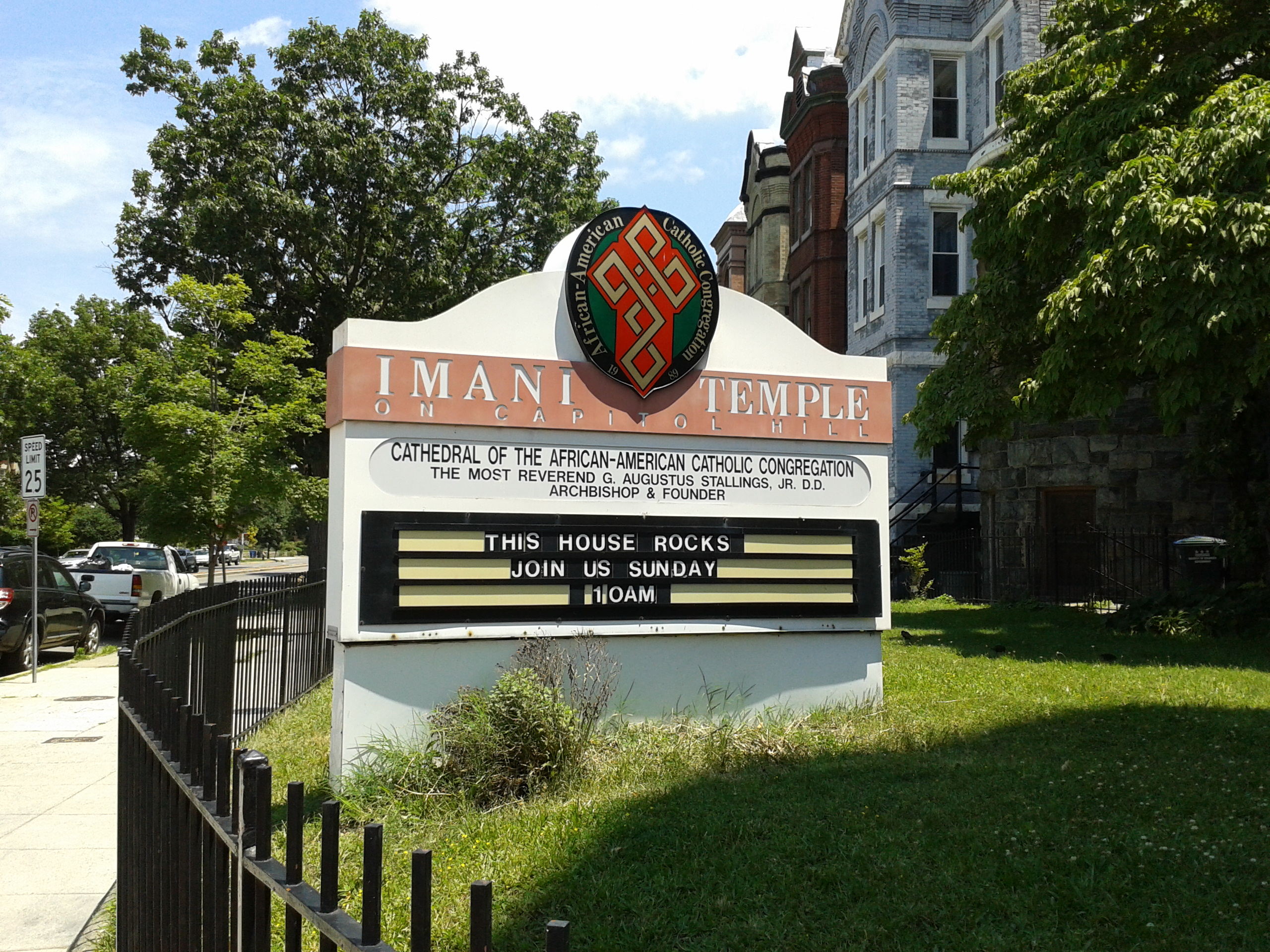
Sign of the former Imani Temple in Washington, D.C. (2014)

George Augustus Stallings Jr., then a priest of the Roman Catholic Archdiocese of Washington, founded the Imani Temple African-American Catholic Congregation as a single congregation in Washington, D.C., in July 1989. The Imani Temple church was founded in Dumbarton Chapel at Howard University Law School's D.C. campus.

He named it "Imani" for the Swahili word imani, meaning "faith." The Imani Temple African-American Catholic Congregation was founded as a result of the Black Catholic movement. At its founding, Stallings believed Roman Catholicism did not serve the Black and African American community nor recognized talent. He and the African-American Catholic Congregation argued "that the White church has stripped African Americans of their history, their heritage, and their self-esteem". Stallings and the African-American Catholic Congregation also proposed establishing a private school, the Imani Academy.

Not long after the foundation of the Imani Temple African-American Catholic Congregation, in 1990, one priest who established another congregation for the Independent Catholic denomination would leave and desire reconciliation with the Catholic Church; he would petition the Roman Catholic Archdiocese of Washington for readmittance.

In May 1990, Stallings was consecrated as bishop for the African-American Catholic Congregation by Richard Michael Bridges—a bishop of the American Independent Orthodox Church. He was assisted by Emil Fairfield Rodriguez of the Mexican National Catholic Church and Donald Lawrence Jolly.

By September 1991, Bridges's group conferred upon Stallings the title of archbishop. In 1991, Stallings also ordained the first female priest for the church. By October 1991, Bridges repudiated Stallings and the African-American Catholic Congregation, citing "doctrinal differences"; Stallings would then threaten to excommunicate his chief consecrator for disloyalty, in spite of his chief consecrator having never been incardinated within Stallings' jurisdiction.

In 1994, the Imani Temple in D.C. purchased the former Eastern Presbyterian Church, designed by noted Washington architect Appleton P. Clark Jr. and opened in 1893.

By 2000, the African-American Catholic Congregation grew and consisted of 7 Imani Temples located in the United States and Nigeria; most of its congregations were located along the U.S. East Coast.

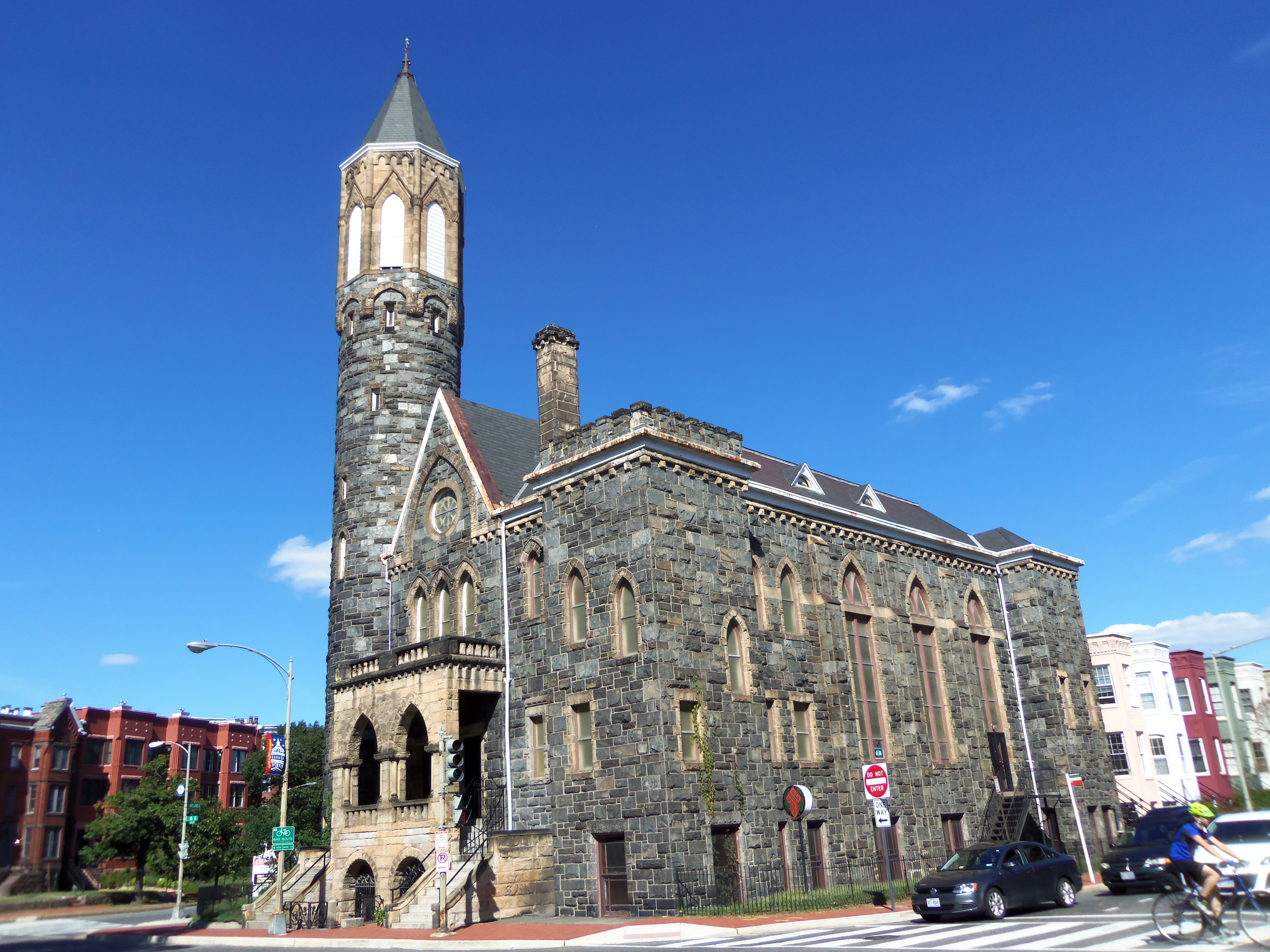
Former Imani Temple in D.C. (2012)

In 2006, the excommunicated Catholic archbishop Emmanuel Milingo (who married a woman from South Korea in 2001 at the same ceremony as Stallings) performed a conditional consecration for Stallings and three other married Independent Catholic bishops (including Peter Paul Brennan) at the Imani Temple church in Washington.

In 2013, a female Baptist bishop in Detroit, Michigan (resigning from their Baptist congregation for their same-sex marriage to an emeritus bishop of the African-American Catholic Congregation) established an affirming church with their partner.

In 2014, the denomination decided to relocate to Prince George's County, Maryland, and sold the Imani Temple in Washington to property developers. It was renovated and adapted for sale as six luxury condominiums.

== Doctrine ==
At its founding, Stallings considered abortion and contraception matters of individual conscience; rejected homosexual activity as a sin; and welcomed divorced or remarried Christians without an annulment. Additionally, AACC teaching—in contrast to Catholic teaching—allows women to be ordained. Unlike the Latin Catholic Church, it does not as a rule, require celibacy of its priests. In 1991, their first female priest was ordained. The denomination also subscribes to the Twelve Declarations of the African-American Catholic Congregation, and its masses feature West African traditional religious practices including libations on behalf of the deceased; during the pouring of the libations, the Trinity is referred to as "Mother-Father, the Son, and the Holy Spirit" and praise is given to the ancestors alongside God.

== See also ==
- George Augustus Stallings Jr., founder of Imani Temple and the African-American Catholic Congregation
