= George Augustus Stallings Jr. =

African-American Independent Catholic bishop

The Most Reverend George Augustus Stallings Jr.
- Archbishop of the African-American Catholic Congregation
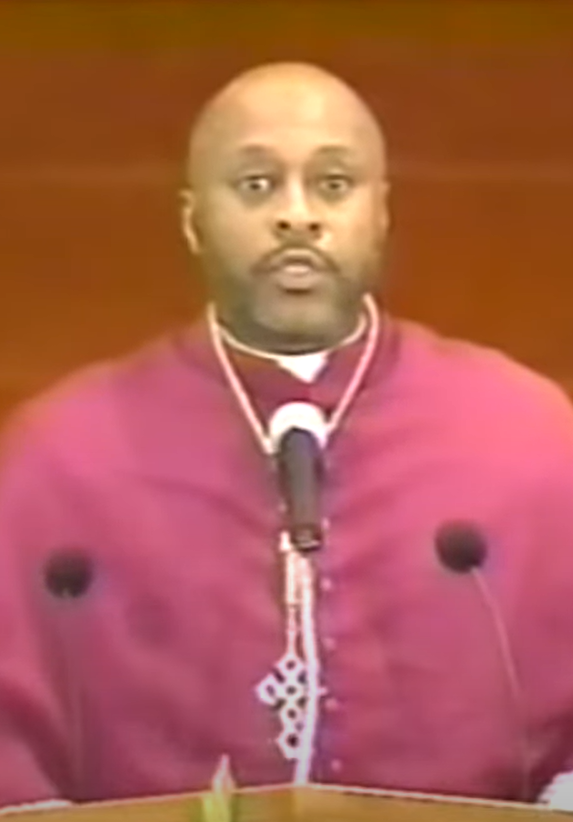
- Stallings in 1993
- Church: African-American Catholic Congregation
- In office: 1990–present
- Previous post: Priest of the Roman Catholic Archdiocese of Washington (excommunicated)

Orders
- Ordination: July 20, 1974
- Consecration: May 12, 1990 (repudiated) by Richard Bridges, Donald Lawrence Jolly, Emil Fairfield Rodriguez

Personal details
- Born: March 17, 1948 (age 78) New Bern, North Carolina, US
- Denomination: Independent Catholicism
- Education: Pontifical North American College; Pontifical University of Saint Thomas Aquinas

George Augustus Stallings Jr. (born March 17, 1948) is an American religious leader. He was the founder of the Imani Temple African-American Catholic Congregation and was long active in the Black Catholic movement. He served as a Catholic priest from 1974 to 1989, and was based in Washington, D.C., for many years. He established the Imani Temple as an independent church in 1989, making a public break in 1990 with the Roman Catholic Church on The Phil Donahue Show. The Archbishop of Washington excommunicated him that year. In 1991, he was also repudiated by his chief consecrator.

== Biography ==
=== Early life and priestly ministry ===
Stallings was born in 1948 in New Bern, North Carolina, to George Augustus Stallings Sr., and Dorothy Smith. His grandmother—Bessie Taylor—introduced him as a boy to worship in a black Baptist church. He enjoyed the service so much that he said he wanted to be a minister. During his high school years, he began expressing "Afrocentric" sentiments, insisting on his right to wear a mustache, despite school rules, as a reflection of black identity.

To prepare for the priesthood, he attended St. Pius X Seminary in Kentucky and received a BA degree in philosophy in 1970. Sent by his bishop to the Pontifical North American College in Rome, he earned three degrees from the Pontifical University of Saint Thomas Aquinas between 1970 and 1975: the Bachelor of Sacred Theology (S.T.B.), a master's degree in pastoral theology, and a Licentiate of Sacred Theology (S.T.L.).

Stallings was ordained a priest in 1974. His first assignment was as an associate pastor at Our Lady of Peace Church, Washington, D.C. In 1976, at age 28 and two years after ordination, he was named a pastor of St. Teresa of Avila parish in Washington. He was the pastor of this church for 14 years. During Stallings' pastorate, the parish become known for its integration of African American culture and gospel music in the Mass. He was active in the Black Catholic movement and promoted the integration of African American culture into Roman Catholicism.

In 1985, Stallings secretly bought a private home in Anacostia in violation of the archdiocese rule requiring priests to live in the parish rectory. The Washington Post reported that Stallings had allegedly misused parish funds to renovate his Anacostia house. In 1988, he was transferred to a new position as a diocesan evangelist.

=== Imani Temple ===
In the late 1980s, Stallings made numerous appearances in the news media. He was interviewed on The Oprah Winfrey Show, Larry King Live, The Phil Donahue Show and The Diane Rehm Show. By 1989, Stallings had announced he was leaving to found a new ministry, the Imani Temple African-American Catholic Congregation, breaking with the Holy See. He stated that he left because Roman Catholicism did not serve the African American community or recognize talent.

In 1989, The Washington Post reported that a former altar boy at St. Teresa of Avila Church accused Stallings of sexual misconduct over a period of several months in 1977. Stallings said "I am innocent," declining to answer questions. In a follow-up series of three articles in 1990, Post reporters Bill Dedman and Laura Sessions Stepp reported that concerns about Stallings' association with teenage boys had contributed to his split from the Roman Catholic Church. Stallings' former pastoral assistant, who was 22 at the time, spoke publicly about having an alleged two-year sexual relationship with him.

=== Excommunication, consecration and repudiation ===
In January 1990, Stallings announced on The Phil Donahue Show that he was breaking with papal authority and giving up Roman Catholic teaching on abortion, contraception, homosexuality, and divorce; Stallings considered abortion and contraception matters of individual conscience; rejected homosexual activity as a sin; and welcomed divorced or remarried Christians without an annulment. Thirteen days prior, Stallings attested that Archbishop James Hickey of Washington had ordered him to seek psychiatric treatment for an "excessive ego." Hickey saw Stallings' lifestyle as extravagant and possibly funded by donations to the church. Following the founding of Imani Temple, Hickey formally excommunicated Stallings and any Roman Catholics remaining in the Imani Temple movement.

Stallings was consecrated a bishop on May 12, 1990, by Richard Michael Bridges, a bishop of the American Independent Orthodox Church. He was assisted by Emil Fairfield Rodriguez of the Mexican National Catholic Church and Donald Lawrence Jolly. In 1991, Bridges's group conferred upon Stallings the title of archbishop. That same year, Bridges repudiated Stallings concerning doctrinal differences; and Stallings threatened to excommunicate his chief consecrator for disloyalty.

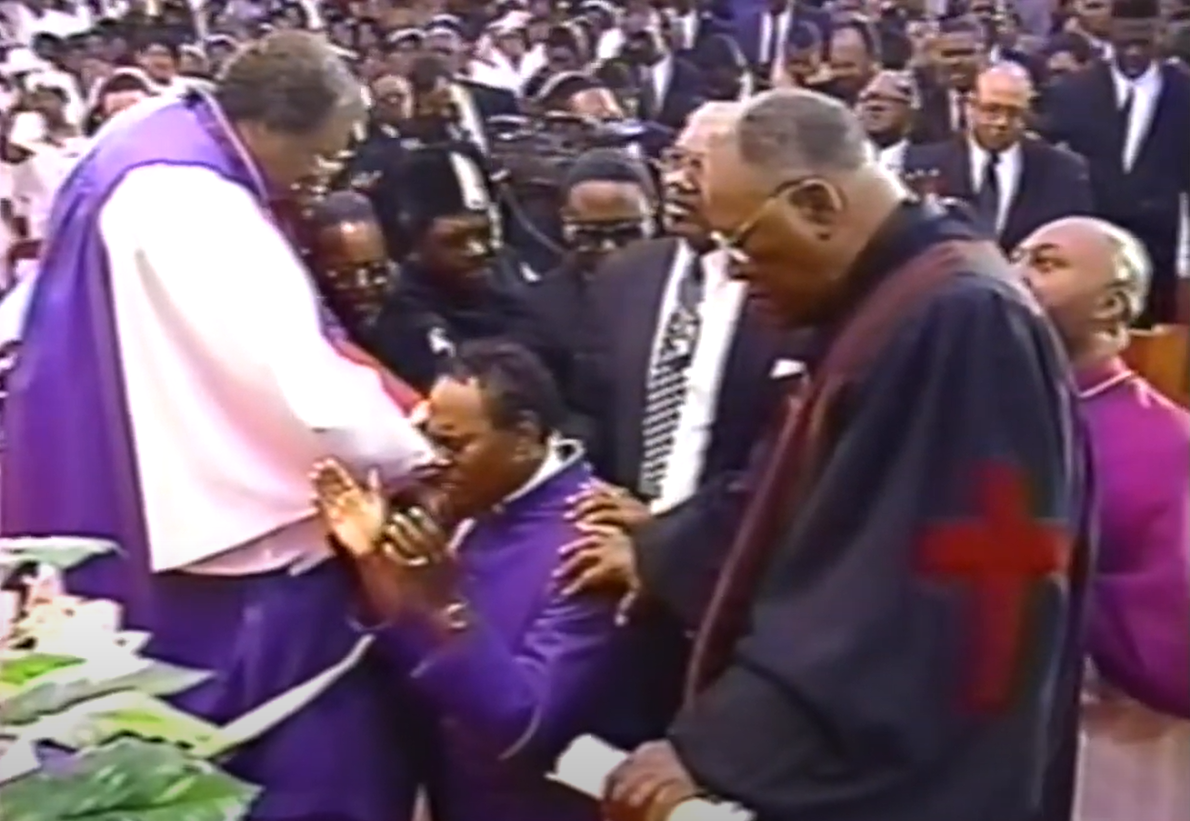
Paul Morton's consecration, with Archbishop Stallings laying hands during the prayer of ordination (1993)

In March 1993, Stallings assisted in consecrating Paul S. Morton as a bishop for the Full Gospel Baptist Church Fellowship.

In 2009, the archdiocese reached a $125,000 settlement with Gamal Awad, who said he was sexually abused at the age of 14 by Stallings and a seminarian in 1984.

=== Marriage and conditional consecration ===
In 2001, Stallings married Sayomi Kamimoto, a 24-year-old native of Okinawa, Japan, in a ceremony in New York City presided over by Sun Myung Moon, the founder of the Unification Church. Emmanuel Milingo—a former Roman Catholic archbishop who was excommunicated—married a woman from South Korea at the same mass ceremony. Members of the Imani Temple were so upset by Stallings' sudden announcement of his upcoming wedding that some left after services in protest of his "close affiliation with and adoption of doctrine of the Unification Church." Stallings would later consider Moon as the true Messiah.

In 2004, Stallings was a key organizer for an event in which Moon was crowned with a "crown of peace." The event was attended by a number of members of the U.S. Congress, a number of whom said that they were misled. It was held at the Dirksen Senate Office Building, the use of which requires a senator's approval. Stallings said the matter of who approved access was "shrouded in mystery." Stallings was national co-president of the American Clergy Leadership Conference, an affiliate of Moon's Unification Church, and active in efforts to widen Moon's influence among black clergy. He regained attention in 2006 due to his association with Milingo and his group Married Priests Now; Milingo conditionally consecrated Stallings, Peter Paul Brennan, and two other Independent Catholic bishops in a ceremony in September of that year, incurring automatic excommunication. Though all were denounced and excommunicated by the Roman Church, however, according to the Catholic understanding of sacramental character, Milingo and the four men were nevertheless considered "valid but illicit." Following this conditional sacrament, Stallings praised his second excommunication from the Roman Church.

=== Denial of Hell ===
Following the January 2024 death of Pentecostal bishop and Christian universalist Carlton Pearson, Stallings denied the existence of an eternal and physical Hell.

== Politics ==
Stallings made his first leap into politics when he announced for the Ward 6 D.C. Council seat in December 1996. Stallings ran under the nationalist-oriented Umoja Party.

== Works ==
- I Am ... Living in the Rhythm of the God Within the Key of G Minor (2003, SKS Press). ISBN 978-0974558608
