= Episcopus vagans =

Christian bishop consecrated irregularly

In Christianity, an episcopus vagans (plural episcopi vagantes; Latin for 'wandering bishops' or 'stray bishops') is a person consecrated, in a "clandestine or irregular way", as a bishop outside the structures and canon law of the established churches; a person regularly consecrated but later excommunicated, and not in communion with any generally recognized diocese; or a person who has in communion within small groups that appear to exist solely for the bishop's sake.

David V. Barrett, in the Encyclopedia of New Religious Movements, specifies that episcopi vagantes are now "those independent bishops who collect several different lines of transmission of apostolic succession, and who will happily (and sometimes for a fee) consecrate anyone who requests it". Those described as wandering bishops often see the term as pejorative. The general term for "wandering" clerics, as were common in the Middle Ages, is clerici vagantes; the general term for those recognising no leader is acephali.

The Oxford Dictionary of the Christian Church mentions as the main lines of succession deriving from episcopi vagantes in the 20th century those founded by Arnold Mathew, Joseph René Vilatte and Leon Chechemian.

== History ==
According to Buchanan, "the real rise of the problem" happened in the 19th century, in the "wake of the Anglo-Catholic movement", "through mischievous activities of a tiny number of independently acting bishops". They exist worldwide, he writes, "mostly without congregations", and "many in different stages of delusion and fantasy, not least in the Episcopal titles they confer on themselves"; "the distinguishing mark" to "specifically identif[y]" an episcopus vagans is "the lack of a true see or the lack of a real church life to oversee".

Paul Halsall, on the Internet History Sourcebooks Project, did not list a single church edifice of independent bishops, in a 1996–1998 New York City building architecture survey of religious communities, which maintain bishops claiming apostolic succession and claim cathedral status but noted there "are now literally hundreds of these 'episcopi vagantes', of lesser or greater spiritual probity. They seem to have a tendency to call living room sanctuaries 'cathedrals';" those buildings were not perceived as cultural symbols and did not meet the survey criteria. David V. Barrett wrote, in A Brief Guide to Secret Religions, that "one hallmark of such bishops is that they often collect as many lineages as they can to strengthen their Episcopal legitimacy—at least in their own eyes", and adds that their groups have more clergy than members.

Barrett wrote that leaders "of some esoteric movements, are also priests or bishops in small non-mainstream Christian Churches"; he explains, this type of "independent or autocephalous" group has "little in common with the Church it developed from, the Old Catholic Church, and even less in common with the Roman Catholic Church" but still claims its authority from apostolic succession.

Buchanan writes that based the criteria of having "a true see" or having "a real church life to oversee", the bishops of most forms of the Continuing Anglican movement are not necessarily classified as vagantes, but "are always in danger of becoming such".

== Theological issues ==
=== Catholic ===
A Latin or Eastern Catholic ordained to the episcopacy without a mandate from the pope is automatically excommunicated and is thereby forbidden to celebrate the sacraments under Catholic canon law. However, in light of the sacramental character of the episcopacy in Catholic theology and of the doctrine of ex opere operato (according to which the efficacy of a sacrament does not depend on the merits of the person who performs or who receives the sacrament) such an ordination is considered "valid but illicit". This means that, although excommunicated and forbidden from carrying out any ministry under the authority of the Catholic Church, an individual thus ordained is regarded as having the full sacramental powers of a bishop, including the power to ordain other bishops.

On the other hand, the view expressed by the International Bishops' Conference of the Old Catholic Church with regard to the ordinations by Arnold Mathew is that the episcopacy exists for service within a specific Christian church and, therefore, that an ordination ceremony that concerns only the individual himself does not make him truly a bishop. The Vatican has not commented on whether it concurs with this interpretation, but it has declared with regard to ordinations of this kind carried out, for example, by Emmanuel Milingo upon Peter Paul Brennan and others, that the Catholic Church "does not recognize and does not intend to recognize in the future those ordinations or any of the ordinations derived from them and therefore the canonical state of the alleged bishops remains that in which they were before the ordination conferred by Mr Milingo".

=== Eastern Orthodox ===
Vlassios Pheidas, on an official Church of Greece site, uses the canonical language of the Eastern Orthodox tradition, to describe the conditions in ecclesial praxis when sacraments, including holy orders, are real, valid, and efficacious. He notes language is itself part of the ecclesiological problem.

If […] divine grace is granted to all, […] then it stands to reason that it is bestowed also in those believers outside the [Eastern] Orthodox Church, even if such persons belong to a heresy of schism. Thus, the sacraments performed outside the Church are not only real (υποστατά), but also valid (έγκυρα), because they only lack the efficacy (ενέργεια) of the bestowed divine grace, which is operative through the Holy Spirit only within the [Eastern] Orthodox Church.

[...]

Through such a teaching […] one finds himself face to face with the […] principle of "extra Ecclesia nulla salus", which strictly determines the canonical limits of the Church. Thus, the [Eastern] Orthodox Church, while accepting the canonical possibility of recognising the existence (υποστατόν) of sacraments performed outside herself, it questions their validity (έγκυρον) and certainly rejects their efficacy (ενεργόν). It is already well-known that in the ecclesial praxis, the Orthodox Church moves, according to the specific circumstances, between canonical "acribeia" and ecclesial economy, recognising by economy the validity (κύρος) of the sacraments of those ecclesiastical bodies. Yet, such a practice of economy does not overthrow the canonical "acribeia", which also remains in force and expresses the exclusive character of orthodox ecclesiology.

This observation is really important, because it reveals that the canonical recognition (αναγνώρισις) of the validity of sacraments performed outside the [Eastern] Orthodox Church: (a) is done by economy, (b) covers only specific cases in certain given instances, and (c) refers to the validity of the sacraments only of those who join the [Eastern] Orthodox Church, and not of the ecclesiastical bodies to which belong those who join the [Eastern] Orthodox Church. There is, […] a variety of opinions or reservations concerning this question. No one, […] could propose or support the view that the mutual recognition of the validity of sacraments among the Churches is an ecclesiastical act consistent with orthodox ecclesiology, or an act which is not rejected by the orthodox canonical tradition. […]

[…]

[…] the mutual recognition of the validity of certain sacraments, […] is for an [Eastern] Orthodox an act of inconsistency, when it is assessed with orthodox ecclesiological principles. These ecclesiological principles manifest in a strict fashion the organic unity of the orthodox ecclesial body and differentiate those who do not belong to its body as either schismatics or heretics.

The relation of schismatics or heretics to the body of the [Eastern] Orthodox Church is strictly defined by the canonical tradition. However, orthodox canonical tradition and praxis appraises and classifies these ecclesiastical bodies into various categories, […] in which some form of ecclesiality is recognised. This type of ecclesiality is not easily determined, because the orthodox tradition […] does not recognise the efficacy of the divine grace outside the canonical boundaries of the [Eastern] Orthodox Church.

This applies to the validity and efficacy of the ordination of bishops and the other sacraments, not only of the Independent Catholic churches, but also of all other Christian churches, including the Roman Catholic Church, Oriental Orthodoxy and the Assyrian Church of the East. Through strict adherence to the law superseding economy by their Cyprian understanding, in this instance, there may be questionably valid sacraments outside of the Eastern Orthodox Church, yet they lack any efficacy. However, some mainstream Eastern Orthodox bodies recognize Roman Catholic orders and don't conditionally ordain clergy as each autocephalous church determines the validity and efficacy of another's ordination. There have also been several canonically disputed or independent Eastern Orthodox clergy received into the mainstream or canonical Eastern Orthodox Church in certain instances—also without conditional ordination, whose predecessors were either once part of or remained outside of canonical Eastern Orthodoxy—in contrast with Pheidas' statement on economy.

The Ecumenical Patriarchate of Constantinople likewise teaches that through "extreme oikonomia [economy]", those who are baptized in the Oriental Orthodox, Roman Catholic, Lutheran, Old Catholic, Moravian, Anglican, Methodist, Reformed, Presbyterian, Church of the Brethren, Assemblies of God, or Baptist traditions can be received into the Eastern Orthodox Church through the sacrament of Chrismation and not through re-baptism.

The predominant view, however, continues to reject those raised to the episcopacy outside of the mainstream or canonical Eastern Orthodox Church as valid bishops in holy orders.

=== Oriental Orthodox ===
Alongside Catholicism, the Oriental Orthodox Churches teach that ordination confers an imperishable character.

=== Lutheran ===
The Concordia Theological Monthly stated that episcopi vagantes are a concern in Lutheranism. The Lutheran priest Arthur Carl Piepkorn wrote that Gustavus Adolphus Glinz and Friedrich Heiler were consecrated bishops in 1930 by Pierre Gaston Vigué. Heiler then ordained several men as priests who sent on to serve in Lutheran parishes. Episcopi vagantes, according to Piepkorn, approach clergy with a claim to be aligned with Lutheran doctrine and the promise of "incontestably valid and apostolic" priestly ordination or episcopal consecration.

=== Anglican ===
Anglican bishop Colin Buchanan, in the Historical Dictionary of Anglicanism, says that the Anglican Communion has held an Augustinian view of orders, by which "the validity of Episcopal ordinations (to whichever order) is based solely upon the historic succession in which the ordaining bishop stands, irrespective of their contemporary ecclesial context". He describes the circumstances of Archbishop Matthew Parker's consecration as one of the reasons why this theory is "generally held". Parker was chosen by Queen Elizabeth I to be the first Church of England Archbishop of Canterbury after the death of the previous office holder, Cardinal Reginald Pole, the last Roman Catholic Archbishop of Canterbury. Buchanan notes the Roman Catholic Church also focuses on issues of intention and not just breaks in historical succession. He does not explain whether intention has an ecclesiological role, for Anglicans, in conferring or receiving sacraments.

According to the Church of England's canon law, "no person who has been admitted to the order of bishop, priest, or deacon can ever be divested of the character of his order". The Anglican understanding can be summarised as: "once a bishop, always a bishop". In the 39 Articles of Religion, the 26th article suggests the sacraments cannot be invalided by unworthy ministers. Anglican theologian Gerald Bray argued: "If it were, no ministry would be valid, because all have sinned and come short of the glory of God. The validity of a sacrament does not lie in the spiritual state of the minister, which is usually unknown and probably unknowable, but in the promises that the sacrament contains".

The American Episcopal Church's An Episcopal Dictionary of the Church states:

In the same way, medieval scholastics held that confirmation and ordination conferred indelible character. Contemporary Anglican theology appears to reject this view in the case of Confirmation, recognizing no separate character of Confirmation apart from the baptismal character. Although the Episcopal Church makes no such specific claim about ordination, it acts as though ordination were indelible. One who has abandoned or renounced the ordained ministry, or even been deposed from it, is not reordained if he or she is reinstated. Instead, the person is formally restored to the order already held.

== Particular consecrations ==
=== Old Catholics and Old Roman Catholics ===
Arnold Mathew, according to Buchanan, "lapsed into the vagaries of an episcopus vagans". Stephen Edmonds, in the Oxford Dictionary of National Biography, wrote that in 1910 Mathew's wife separated from him; that same year, he declared himself and his church seceded from the Union of Utrecht. Within a few months, on 2 November 1911, he was excommunicated by the Roman Catholic Church. He later sued The Times for libel based on the words "pseudo-bishop" used to describe him in the newspaper's translation from the Latin text "pseudo-episcopus", and, lost his case in 1913.

Henry R.T. Brandreth wrote, in Episcopi Vagantes and the Anglican Church, "[o]ne of the most regrettable features of Mathew's episcopate was the founding of the Order of Corporate Reunion (OCR) in 1908. This claimed to be a revival of Frederick George Lee's movement, but was in fact unconnected with it". Brandreth thought it "seems still to exist in a shadowy underground way" in 1947, but disconnected. Colin Holden, in Ritualist on a Tricycle, places Mathew and his OCR into perspective, he wrote Mathew was an episcopus vagans, lived in a cottage provided for him, and performed his conditional OCR acts, sometimes called according to Holden "bedroom ordinations", in his cottage. Mathew questioned the validity of Anglican ordinations and became involved with the OCR, in 1911 according to Edmonds, and he openly advertised his offer to reordain Anglican clergy who requested it. This angered the Church of England.

In 1912, D. J. Scannell O'Neill wrote in The Fortnightly Review that London "seems to have more than her due share of bishops" and enumerates what he refers to as "these hireling shepherds". He also announces that one of them, Mathew, revived the OCR and published The Torch, a monthly review, advocating the reconstruction of Western Christianity and reunion with Eastern Christianity. The Torch stated "that the ordinations of the Church of England are not recognized by any church claiming to be Catholic" so the promoters involved Mathew to conditionally ordain group members who are "clergy of the Established Church" and "sign a profession of the Catholic Faith". It stipulated Mathew's services were not a system of simony and given without simoniac expectations. The group sought to enroll "earnest-minded Catholics who sincerely desire to help forward the work of [c]orporate [r]eunion with the Holy See". Nigel Yates, in Anglican Ritualism in Victorian Britain, 1830-1910, described it as "an even more bizarre scheme to promote a Catholic Uniate Church in Britain" than Lee and Ambrose Lisle March Phillipps de Lisle's Association for the Promotion of the Unity of Christendom. It was editorialized by O'Neill that the "most charitable construction to be placed on this latest move of Mathew is that he is not mentally sound. Being an Irishman, it is strange that he has not sufficient humor to see the absurdity of falling away from the Catholic Church in order to assist others to unite with the Holy See". (Note: The Torch, no date or page cited by O'Neill. Date given as 19 June 1912 by Persson, but cited without page number or article title.) Edmonds reports that "anything between 4 and 265 was suggested" as to how many took up his offer of reordination.

=== Eastern Orthodox ===
Within the Eastern Orthodox Church, Aftimios Ofiesh was consecrated by Archbishop Evodkim Meschersky. He later, with Metropolitan Platon of the present-day Orthodox Church in America, established the American Orthodox Catholic Church. Through Ofiesh and the American Orthodox Catholic Church, men such as Sophronios Beshara, Ignatius Nichols (considered also an Independent Old Catholic wandering bishop), and Joseph Zuk were consecrated.

Beshara continued to lead the American Orthodox Catholic Church—whose canonical status was disputed and rejected—and Nichols was deposed, continuing to work with Independent Catholics and consecrating others. Notably, one of the many men consecrated by Nichols was Bishop Alexander Turner, who was received into the Greek Orthodox Church of Antioch after an eight-year probationary period. He would be one of the principal founders of the Antiochian Western Rite Vicariate. Zuk would later become a bishop of the Ukrainian Orthodox Church of the USA, which would later join under the Ecumenical Patriarchate. Christopher Contogeorge, consecrated by Beshara in the American Orthodox Catholic Church, would also serve in the Greek Orthodox Archdiocese of America and as exarch for the Greek Orthodox Church of Alexandria.

Though Philaret Denysenko was defrocked and excommunicated by the Russian Orthodox Church; and though he established the Kyiv Patriarchate as an attempted autocephalous Ukrainian church; he would be reinstated and recognized as a bishop by the Ecumenical Patriarchate alongside clergy consecrated by him including Epiphanius of Kyiv of the Orthodox Church of Ukraine.

== See also ==
- Acephali
- Apostolic succession
- Clerici vagantes
- Defrocking
- Independent Catholicism
- Old Believers
- Old Calendarists
- Independent Sacramental Movement
- Spiritual Christianity
