= Thomas Seccombe =

English writer

Thomas Seccombe (1866–1923) was a miscellaneous English writer and, from 1891 to 1901, assistant editor of the Dictionary of National Biography, in which he wrote over 700 entries. A son of physician and episcopus vagans John Thomas Seccombe, he was educated at Felsted and Balliol College, Oxford, taking a first in Modern History in 1889.

== Works ==
- (editor) Twelve Bad Men: Original Studies of Eminent Scoundrels (1894)
- The Age of Johnson (1899)
- The Age of Shakespeare (with John William Allen (1865–1944), 1903)
- Bookman History of English Literature (with W. Robertson Nicoll, 1905–6)
- In Praise of Oxford (1910)
- Scott Centenary Articles (with W. P. Ker, George Gordon, W. H. Hutton, Arthur McDowall, and R. S. Rait, 1932)
- The Dictionary of National Biography (assistant editor)
