= Clerical marriage =

Practice of allowing Christian clergy to marry

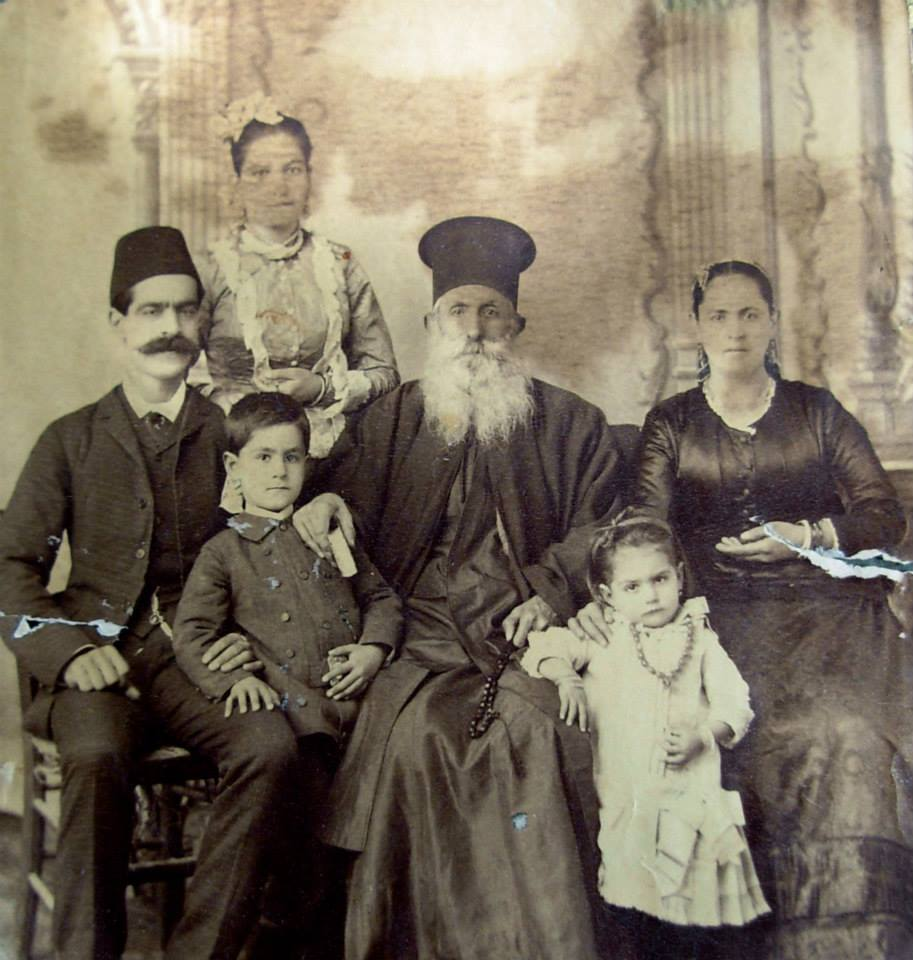
Married Eastern Orthodox priest from Jerusalem with his family (three generations), c. 1893

Clerical marriage is the practice of allowing Christian clergy (those who have already been ordained) to marry. This practice is distinct from allowing married persons to become clergy. Clerical marriage is admitted among Protestants, including both Lutherans and Anglicans.

Many Eastern Churches (Assyrian Church of the East, Eastern Orthodox, Oriental Orthodox, and Eastern Catholic), have married priests, i.e. they allow married men to be ordained, but they do not allow clerical marriage after ordination. Eastern Lutheran clergy are permitted to marry after being ordained, and married Eastern Lutherans are eligible to become clergy. Within the lands of the Eastern Christendom, priests' children often became priests and marry within their social group, establishing a tightly knit hereditary caste among some Eastern Christian communities.

The Latin Catholic Church as a rule requires clerical celibacy for the priesthood since the Gregorian Reform in the late 11th century under the influence of Bernard of Clairvaux, but Eastern Catholic Churches do not require clerical celibacy for the priesthood and the Latin Catholic Church occasionally relaxes the discipline in special cases, such as the conversion of a married Anglican priest who wishes to be ordained a Catholic priest. (Celibacy is, however, a requirement to become a bishop.)

== History ==
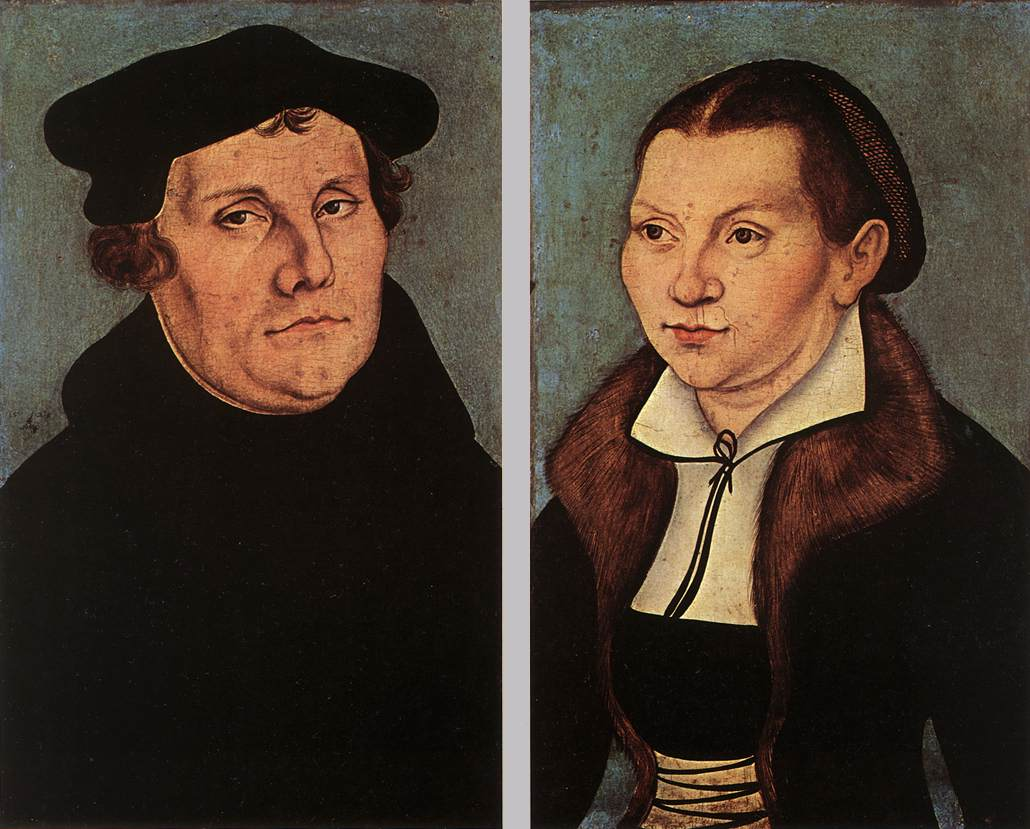
Marriage reform: cleric Martin Luther married Katharina von Bora in 1525.

One of the final drafts of the Six articles (1539), reaffirming clerical celibacy in England

There is no dispute among theologians that at least some of the apostles were married or had been married: a mother-in-law of Peter is mentioned in the account in Matthew 8:14, Mark 1:29–34, Luke 4:38–41 of the beginning of Jesus' ministry. 1 Timothy 3:2 says: "an overseer (Greek ἐπίσκοπος) must be ... the husband of one wife". This has been interpreted in various ways, including that the overseer was not allowed to remarry if his wife died. (Note: While rejecting this interpretation, Baptist scholar Benjamin L. Merkle considers it a possible interpretation, one that has several strengths and fits in with the value that the early church attached to celibacy after the divorce or death of a spouse.)

Evidence for the view that continence was expected of clergy in the early Church is given by the Protestant historian Philip Schaff, who points out that all marriages contracted by clerics in Holy Orders were declared null and void in 530 by Roman Emperor Justinian I, who also declared the children of such marriages illegitimate.

Schaff also quotes the account that "In the Fifth and Sixth Centuries the law of the celibate was observed by all the Churches of the West, thanks to the Councils and to the Popes. In the Seventh and down to the end of the Tenth Century, as a matter of fact the law of celibacy was little observed in a great part of the Western Church, but as a matter of law the Roman Pontiffs and the Councils were constant in their proclamation of its obligation." This report is confirmed by others too. "Despite six hundred years of decrees, canons, and increasingly harsh penalties, the Latin clergy still did, more or less illegally, what their Greek counterparts were encouraged to do by law—they lived with their wives and raised families. In practice, ordination was not an impediment to marriage; therefore some priests did marry even after ordination." "The tenth century is claimed to be the high point of clerical marriage in the Latin communion. Most rural priests were married and many urban clergy and bishops had wives and children." Then at the Second Lateran Council of 1139 the Roman Church declared that Holy Orders were not merely a prohibitive but a diriment canonical impediment to marriage, therefore making a marriage by priests invalid and not merely forbidden.

The great East–West Schism between the Church of Rome and the four Apostolic sees of the Orthodox Communion (Constantinople, Alexandria Egypt, Antioch Syria, and Jerusalem) took place in 1054. As stated above, the majority of Roman Church priests at that time were married. Therefore, when some churches that followed Western rites and traditions were brought back into communion with the Orthodox Churches beginning in the 20th century, their right to have married clergy, provided they were married before ordination, was restored.

The practice of clerical marriage was initiated in the West by the followers of Martin Luther, who himself, a priest and former monk, married Katharina von Bora, a former nun, in 1525. It has not been introduced in the East. In the Church of England, however, the Catholic tradition of clerical celibacy continued after the Break with Rome. Under Henry VIII, the Six Articles prohibited the marriage of clergy and this continued until the passage under Edward VI of the Clergy Marriage Act 1548, opening the way for Anglican priests to marry.

== Present-day practice ==
Generally speaking, in modern Christianity, Protestant and some independent Catholic churches allow for ordained clergy to marry after ordination. However, in recent times, a few exceptional cases can be found in some Orthodox churches in which ordained clergy have been granted the right to marry after ordination.

=== Protestant Churches ===
Following the example of Martin Luther, who, though an ordained priest, married in 1525, Protestant denominations permit an unmarried ordained pastor to marry. They thus admit clerical marriage, not merely the appointment of already married persons as pastors. But in view of 1 Timothy 3:2 and 3:12, some do not admit a second marriage by a widowed pastor.

In these denominations there is generally no requirement that a pastor be already married nor prohibition against marrying after "answering the call". Being married is commonly welcomed, in which case the pastor's marriage is expected to serve as a model of a functioning Christian marriage, and the pastor's spouse often serves an unofficial leadership role in the congregation. For this reason, some Protestant churches will not accept a divorced person for this position. In denominations that ordain both men and women, a married couple might serve as co-pastors.

Certain denominations require a prospective pastor to be married before he can be ordained, based on the view (drawn from 1 Timothy 3 and Titus 1) that a man must demonstrate the ability to run a household before he can be entrusted with the church. Even in these strictest groups, a widower may still serve. This again concerns marriage before appointment as pastor, not clerical marriage.

Some Protestant clergy and their children have played an essential role in literature, philosophy, science, and education in Early Modern Europe.

=== Eastern Churches ===
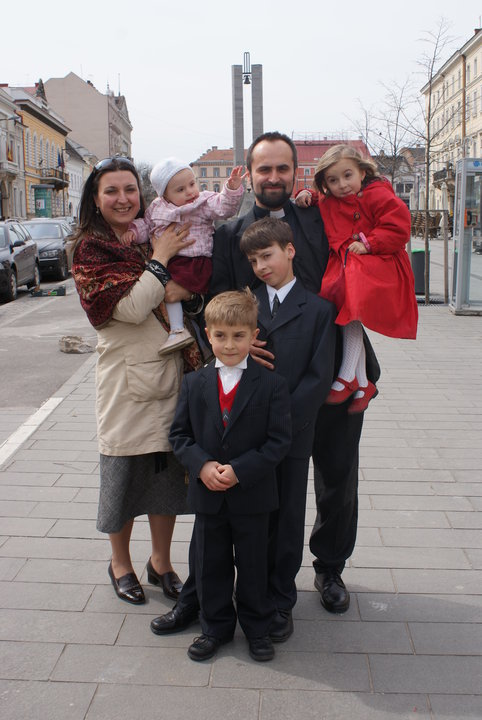
Married Romanian Eastern Catholic priest with his family

The Assyrian, Eastern Orthodox and Oriental Orthodox Churches, as well as many of the Eastern Catholic Churches, permit married men to be ordained. Traditionally however, they do not permit clergy to marry after ordination. From ancient times they have had both married and celibate clergy (see Monasticism). Those who opt for married life must marry before becoming priests, deacons (with a few exceptions), or, in some strict traditions, subdeacons.

The vast majority of Orthodox parish clergy are married men, which is one of the major differences between the Orthodox and Catholic Churches; however, they must marry before being ordained. Since the marriage takes place while they are still laymen and not yet clergy, the marriage is not a clerical marriage, even if it occurs while they are attending the seminary. Clerical marriage is thus not admitted in the Orthodox Church, unlike in the Protestant Churches. In the Russian Orthodox Church, the clergy, over time, formed a hereditary caste of priests. Marrying outside of these priestly families was strictly forbidden; indeed, some bishops did not even tolerate their clergy marrying outside of the priestly families of their diocese. In general, Eastern Catholic Churches have always allowed ordination of married men as priests and deacons. Within the lands of the Ukrainian Greek Catholic Church, the second largest Eastern Catholic Church, priests' children often became priests and married within their social group, establishing a tightly knit hereditary caste. Traditionally, the rejection of clerical marriage has meant that a married deacon or priest whose wife dies could not remarry but must embrace celibacy. However, in recent times, some bishops have relaxed this rule and allowed exceptions. One way to do this is to laicize the widowed priest so that his subsequent marriage will be that of a layman (and hence not an instance of clerical marriage) and then allow him to apply for re-ordination.

Subdeacons (or hypodeacons, the highest of the clerical minor orders) are often included with clerics in major orders (like deacons and priests) in early canons that prohibit clerical marriage, such as Apostolic Canon 26. In light of these canons, several different approaches are used today to allow subdeacons to marry. One approach has been to bless acolytes or readers to vest and act as subdeacons temporarily or permanently, thus creating a new distinction between a 'blessed subdeacon'—who may not touch the altar or assume other prerogatives of ordained subdeacons outside services—and an 'ordained subdeacon'. Another approach is to simply delay the formal ordination of the subdeacon, if, for example, a likely candidate for the subdiaconate has stated an intention to marry but has not yet done so. Finally, sometimes the canons are simply ignored, thereby permitting even formally ordained subdeacons to marry.

Generally, if a deacon or priest divorces his wife, he may not continue in ministry, although there are also exceptions to this rule, such as if the divorce is deemed to be the fault of the wife.

Bishops in the Orthodox Churches are elected from among those clergy who are not married, whether celibate (as the monastic clergy must be) or widowed. If a widowed priest is elected bishop, he must take monastic vows before he can be consecrated.

=== Catholic Church ===
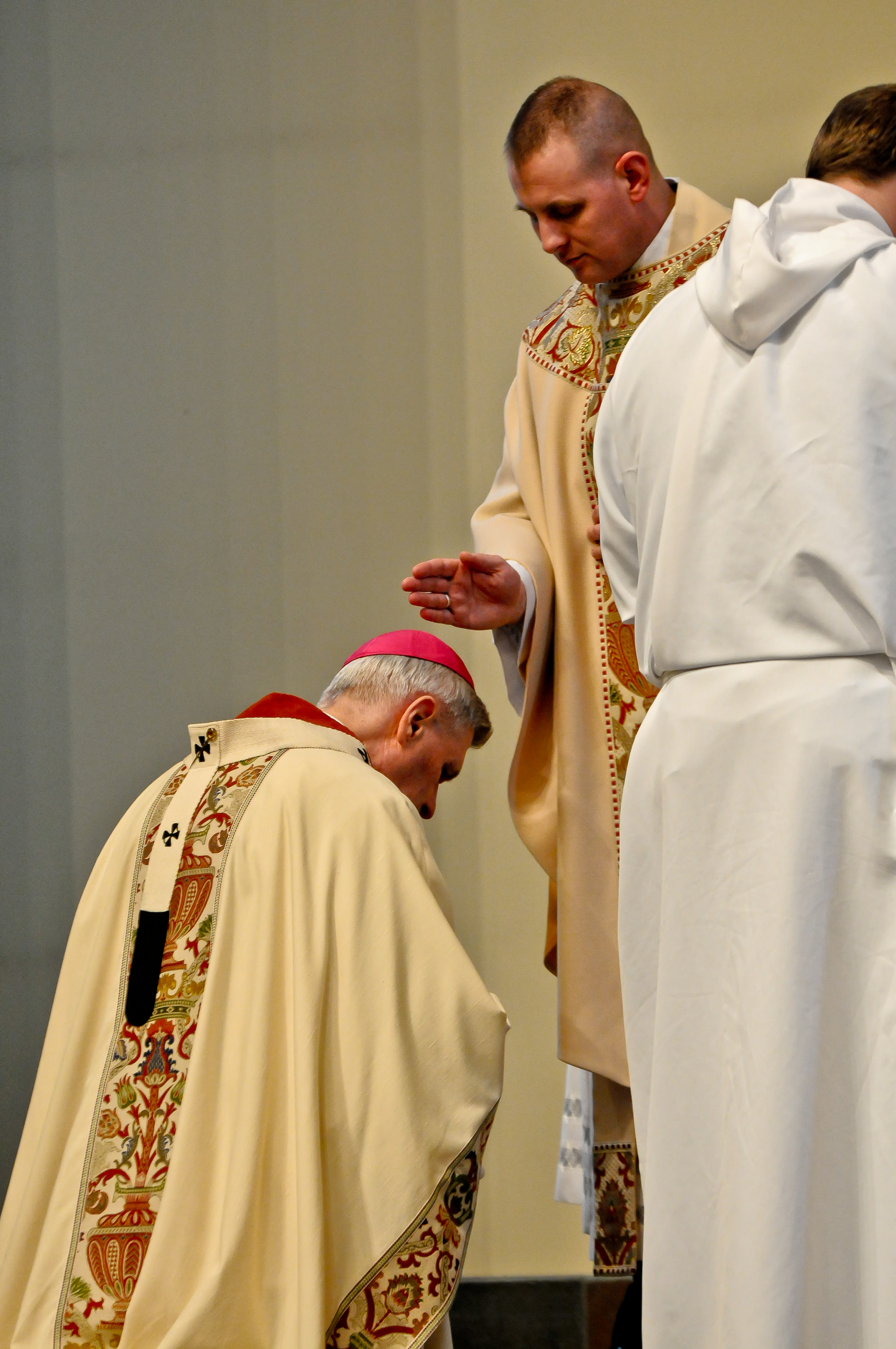
A married former Anglican gives his first blessing as a Catholic priest.

Like the Eastern Churches, the Catholic Church does not allow clerical marriage, although many of the Eastern Catholic Churches do allow the ordination of married men as priests.

The Second Vatican Council commended celibacy as a gift "to be embraced and esteemed", but acknowledged that within the Eastern Catholic Churches there are married priests "of [the] highest merit". Priests who are both married and ordained were invited by the Council "to persevere in their holy vocation so that they may fully and generously continue to expend themselves for the sake of the flock commended to them".

Within the Catholic Church, the Latin Church generally follows the discipline of clerical celibacy, which means that, as a rule, only unmarried or widowed men are accepted as candidates for ordination. An exception to this practice arises in the case of married non-Catholic clergymen who become Catholic and seek to serve as priests. The Holy See may grant dispensations from the usual rule of celibacy to allow such men to be ordained. For example, some married former Anglican priests and Lutheran ministers have been ordained to the priesthood after being received into the Church. The establishment of personal ordinariates for former Anglicans beginning in 2011 has added to such requests.

As in the Orthodox Churches, some Catholic priests receive dispensation from the obligation of celibacy through laicization, which may occur either at the request of the priest or as a punishment for a grave offense. Any subsequent marriage undertaken by the laicized former priest is thus considered to be the marriage of a layman, and not an instance of clerical marriage. In contrast to the Orthodox practice, however, such a married former priest may not apply to be restored to the priestly ministry while his wife is still living.

==== Lack of enforcement for celibacy policy ====
Despite the Latin Church's historical practice of priestly celibacy, there have been Catholic priests throughout the centuries who have simulated marriage through the practice of concubinage. Repeatedly throughout church history, violations of the Catholic celibacy policy have not been grounds for defrocking.

The Vatican, it was revealed in February 2019, secretly enacted rules to protect the clerical status of Catholic clergy who violated their vow of celibacy. One example was shown in the Diocese of Greensburg in Pennsylvania, where a priest in the 1950s maintained his clerical status despite having "married" a 17-year-old girl (whom he had impregnated) by forging the signature of another priest on a marriage certificate only to "divorce" the girl months later. In 2012, Kevin Lee, a priest in Australia, revealed that he had maintained his clerical status after being secretly "married" for a full year and that church leaders were aware of his secret "marriage", but disregarded the celibacy policy. The same year, former Los Angeles Auxiliary Bishop Gabino Zavala, who did not resign either from his post as Auxiliary Bishop or from the Catholic clergy until revelations that he fathered two children were made public, was implicated by the Los Angeles Times for having "more than a passing relationship" with the mother of his two children, who also had two separate pregnancies.

== See also ==
- International Federation of Married Catholic Priests
- Western Ukrainian Clergy
- Clerical celibacy
- Married Priests Now!
- Children of the Ordained
- Ecclesiastical differences between the Catholic Church and the Eastern Orthodox Church § Celibacy of the priestly order
- Augsburg Confession, Article XXIII: Of the Marriage of Priests
- Priest shortage in the Catholic Church
- Synod of Bishops for the Pan-Amazon region
