= BK Tooling v Scope Precision Engineering =

South African legal case

BK Tooling (Edms) Bpk v Scope Precision Engineering (Edms) Bpk, an important case in South African contract law, was heard and decided in the Appellate Division on 16 September 1977 and 15 September 1978 respectively. The case dealt with remedies for the breach of a reciprocal contract in cases where the creditor has been prevented from performing fully his obligations by the failure of the other party's necessary co-operation. The court held that the creditor may in such circumstances claim performance, but that his claim will be subject to a reduction by the costs he saves in not having fully to make his counterperformance.

The court also discussed the principles applicable to the exceptio non-adimpleti contractus and held that, where there has been incomplete performance by the creditor (in this case the plaintiff), the debtor (defendant) is entitled to claim compensation. Where there has been no resiling, the creditor may institute a claim for a reduced contract price. A court, in the exercise of its discretion, may permit a relaxation of the strict principle of reciprocity where the other party has utilised the partial performance.

== Judgment ==
The court accepted that, when a creditor in a reciprocal contract is prevented from making fully his own counter-performance by the failure of the other party's necessary co-operation, he may, despite his own incomplete performance, claim performance by the other party. This, however, will be subject (basically as also in other legal systems) to reduction of the performance claimed by the costs saved by the creditor in not having to perform fully his own obligation.

The court considered a few aspects of the principle of reciprocity and its application by means of the exceptio non-adimpleti contractus:

1. In contracts whereby reciprocal obligations are created, the question of whether the obligations are so closely linked that the principle of reciprocity applies is basically a matter of interpretation. If, however, no other intention appears, the principle applies by operation of law to certain well-known contracts, such as, for example, the contract of sale and locatio conductio operis.
2. The sequence of performance and counter-performance also depends on the contractual provisions. If, however, another intention does not appear, the contractor, in locatio conductio operis for example, must first perform.
3. On the ground that withholding the thing sold was regarded already in the Corpus Juris as analogous to the holding of a pledge, one would expect that the exceptio would only apply as a defence until performance was actually made. The right of withholding (the converse of the exceptio) is therefore essentially a means of enforcing the counter-performance. It can fulfil a function similar to retention moneys in a building contract. On the other hand, it follows that, as long as performance remains possible and the contract is not cancelled, the other party can still perform. Indeed, this possibility should be related to the doctrine of mora and purgatio morae.
4. If the right of withholding is seen as analogous to the holding of a pledge, this would entail that a party's own performance could be withheld until the counter-performance is fully rendered. In the case of locatio conductio operis, it is all the more the case that the contractor must fully perform before he is entitled to the contract price.
5. According to Voet, the onus is on the plaintiff, when the exceptio is raised against him, to prove that he has in fact performed his side of the contract. Since then, this has apparently never been doubted as far as South African law is concerned.

The court found that it was clear from the decisions in Hauman v Nortje, Breslin v Hichens and Van Rensburg v Straughan that the judges had proceeded on the common assumption that, on the ground of general principles, the employer had a right of withholding in regard to his own performance until the contractor had strictly and fully made his counterperformance: "a potent weapon to ensure that the contract is specifically performed." There was also agreement in the decisions that, on the ground of considerations of fairness, a contractor should sometimes, despite the principle of reciprocity, be permitted still to claim compensation for an incomplete performance.

As this could amount to the employer's right to strict compliance being ended, it was extremely important to determine when the employer, by way of exception, is no longer entitled to his right of withholding. In the three cases above, there were to be found at least three points of view, divergent in principle. The point of view of CG Maasdorp JA, in Van Rensburg, belongs more to cases in which there has been a resiling, while those in Hauman of Lord De Villiers CJ and Innes JA apply to cases where there has been no resiling.

The court found that the whole basis of the relaxation of the principle of reciprocity and the recognition of the possibility of instituting a claim for a reduced contract price rests on considerations of fairness, and that, clearly, these considerations may in particular circumstances prescribe that the contractor should still be compensated, even if he knows that he has not fully complied with his obligations. As an equitable solution, the point of view of De Villiers was found to be too narrow. It was determined that that of Innes—that the court, in the exercise of its discretion, allows a relaxation of the strict principle of reciprocity where the other party has utilised the partial performance—provides a far more supple and satisfactory solution. As such, the court held that the latter must henceforth be accepted and applied.

The court emphasised that, according to Innes, the coming into being of the discretionary power of relaxing the principle of reciprocity has no connection whatever with the degree of shortcoming of the incomplete performance. The decisive fact for coming into being is the utilisation of the incomplete performance by the employer, be the shortcoming big or small. The extent of the shortcoming is, at the most, one of the circumstances which may be weighed up in considering the question of fairness which is involved in the exercise of the discretion.

It would be desirable in the future simply to talk of a contractual claim for a reduced contract price, and to avoid names such as quantum meruit and the language of enrichment liability. It would lead to less confusion and greater clarity, and would also fit in, in the normal case, with the amount whereby the contract price is reduced being equivalent, as De Villiers put it, to "such sum as would enable the employer to complete the work in exact accordance with the contract." or, as Innes put it, "the cost of remedying the defects."

If the contractor does not succeed in convincing the Court that he has fully complied with his side of the contract, and he wishes then to claim a reduced contract price, he will have to prove

1. that the employer is utilising the incomplete performance;
2. that circumstances exist which make it equitable for the court to exercise its discretion in his favour; and
3. what the reduced contract price should be: that is, what it will cost to bring his performance in order for the purpose of determining by how much the contract price should be reduced.

In regard to possible consequential damages caused by the shortcoming already suffered, and possible damages as the result of the mora of the contractor, the onus of proof will, on the grounds of general principles, still rest on the employer. The employer will probably have to institute a counter-claim.

The decision in the Transvaal Provincial Division in Scope Precision Engineering (Edms) Bpk v BK Tooling (Edms) Bpk was thus varied.

== See also ==
- Contract
- South African contract law
- Breach of contract
- Principle of reciprocity
- Exceptio non-adimpleti contractus
