= Thomas Wimberley Mossman =

Church of England priest (1826-1885)

Thomas Wimberley Mossman (1826 - 6 July 1885) was a Church of England priest, novelist, translator, episcopus vagans and ritualist leader associated with the Order of Corporate Reunion (OCR).

== Biography ==
He was born in Skipton, North Yorkshire. Ordained priest on 26 May 1850, following studies at St. Edmund Hall, Oxford, he became curate of Donington on Bain (of which his uncle was non-resident rector) as deacon in 1849. He was curate of Panton, Lincolnshire in 1852, vicar of Ranby, Lincolnshire in 1854, and rector of the united benefices of East Torrington and West Torrington in Lincolnshire in 1859. Mossman was the primary English translator of the extensive biblical commentaries of the Flemish Roman Catholic exegete and priest, Cornelius a Lapide (1567-1637).

At West Torrington, Mossman founded the Brotherhood of the Holy Redeemer in 1866 for poor students wishing to study for ordination: "This Religious Order has been instituted with the object of enabling a few Catholic-minded men to form themselves into a Community, wherein they may study and prepare for Holy Orders under the guidance of a Parish Priest." This order collapsed not long after its founding on account of a failure to achieve episcopal approbation.

Mossman assumed the title Bishop of Selby in the Order of Corporate Reunion, an organization founded to re-ordain Church of England clergy with holy orders considered valid by the Holy See, in order to promote recognition by and reunion with the Roman Catholic Church. For these activities, he was expelled from the Society of the Holy Cross (SSC) in 1879. He was a close associate of OCR rector Frederick George Lee and John Thomas Seccombe.

In 1852 Mossman married Mary Jane Ellis, daughter of Captain Dixie Ellis; together, they had seven children, including four sons and three daughters. He received an honorary doctorate from the University of the South in 1881. Mossman became a Roman Catholic during his final illness in 1885, and was received into that communion by his friend Cardinal Henry Edward Manning.

== Bibliography ==
- A Glossary of the Principal Words Used in a Figurative, Typical, or Mystical Sense in the Holy Scriptures (London: Joseph Masters, 1854)
- Sermons (1857)
- The Followers of the Lamb: A Sermon Preached at S. Michael's, Wakefield, on September 30th, 1866, being the Sunday within the Octave of the Dedication Festival of That Church (1867)
- Ritualism versus Protestantism: A Report of the Public Discussion Recently Held at Torrington, between the Rev. T. Booth, Free Methodist Minister, Louth, and the Rev. T.W. Mossman, B.A., Vicar of West Torrington, Lincolnshire (1867)
- The Primacy of S. Peter (London: Bull, Simmons and Co., 1870)
- A History of the Catholic Church of Jesus Christ from the Death of Saint John to the Middle of the Second Century, including an Account of the Original Organisation of the Christian Ministry and the Growth of Episcopacy (London: Longmans, 1873)
- Epiphanius: The History of His Childhood and Youth, Told by Himself (London: J. T. Hayes, 1874) (novel)
- Freedom for the Church of God: An Earnest and Affectionate Appeal to My High Church Brethren (London: J.T. Hayes, 1876)
- The Great Commentary of Cornelius à Lapide (London)
  - volume i. (Matt. i–ix) (1876)
  - volume ii. (Matt. x–xxi) (1876)
  - volume iii. (Matt. xxii–xxviii, and St. Mark's Gospel complete) (1881)
  - volume iv. (John i–xi) (1886)
  - volume v. (John xii–xxi, and Epistles i. ii. and iii.) (1886)
  - St. Luke's Gospel (1908)
- Peter Pyper (pseudonym), Mr. Gray and His Neighbours (London: John Hodges, 1876) (novel)
  - volume one
  - volume two
- The Keys of the Kingdom of Heaven: A Sermon (1878)
- A Letter on the Burials Question from the Rector of Torrington, Lincolnshire to His Parishioners (1880)
- The Relations Which at Present Exist between Church and State in England: A Letter to the Right Hon. W. E. Gladstone, First Lord of the Treasury and Chancellor of the Exchequer (London: John Hodges, 1883)
- A Latin Letter to His Holiness Pope Leo XIII (London: J. Hodges, 1884)
