= Benjamin Merkle =

Benjamin Merkle may refer to:

- Benjamin L. Merkle (born 1971), New Testament scholar
- Benjamin R. Merkle (born 1972), president of New Saint Andrews College
