= John Thomas Seccombe =

English doctor and translator

John Thomas Seccombe (1834 - January 27, 1895) was an English medical doctor, translator, and episcopus vagans associated with Frederick George Lee and Thomas Wimberley Mossman in the Order of Corporate Reunion.

Seccombe received the M.D. from the University of St Andrews in 1862, and was a member of the Royal College of Surgeons; he was also fellow of the Royal Astronomical Society and a member of the Odd Fellows. Seccombe married twice, first to Elizabeth Margaret Clout; his eldest son Thomas Seccombe was an assistant editor of the Dictionary of National Biography. He had five further children with his second wife, Ellen Bates. In addition to medical activities and correspondence with Louis Pasteur, he was considered an expert on campanology and local antiquarian matters, and he served as a Justice of the Peace for Norfolk from 1886 to 1895.

Henry R. T. Brandreth contends that Seccombe, originally an Anglican layman, had become an Orthodox Christian in the early 1860s in London. He may have been consecrated to the episcopate in 1867 by Jules Ferrette, "Bishop of Iona" in the Ancient British Church. Brandreth identifies Seccombe as "the principal mover in inaugurating the Order of Corporate Reunion, or at least in laying down the line in which it was to follow." Seccombe assumed the name and title "Lawrence, Bishop of Caerleon" after supposed consecration as a bishop in 1877 in Italy, and worked with Lee and Mossman to reordain clergy of the Church of England with a view to establishing a body with unquestionably valid holy orders that could be received into the Roman Catholic Church.

Seccombe is believed to have assisted Welsh nationalist Richard Williams Morgan in the consecration of Charles Isaac Stevens (1835–1917), second patriarch of the Ancient British Church (1889–1917) and primus of the Free Protestant Episcopal Church of England (1900–1917).

== Bibliography ==
- Κατηχησις. The Great Catechism of the Holy Catholic, Apostolic and Orthodox Church (London: Simpkin, Marshall & Co., 1867)
- The Holy Canons of the Seven Œcumenic Synods Translated from the Original Greek (London: Simpkin, Marshall & Co., 1867)
- Science, Theism and Revelation, Considered in Relation to Mr. Mill's Essay on Nature, Religion and Atheism (London: Simpkin, Marshall & Co., 1875)
- "The Church of Terrington St. Clement" in Norfolk Archaeology (Norwich: Agas H. Goose, 1895), Vol. 12, pp. 1–12.
