= West Torrington =

Small hamlet in the East Lindsey district of Lincolnshire, England

Coordinates: 53.323653°N 0.296606°W

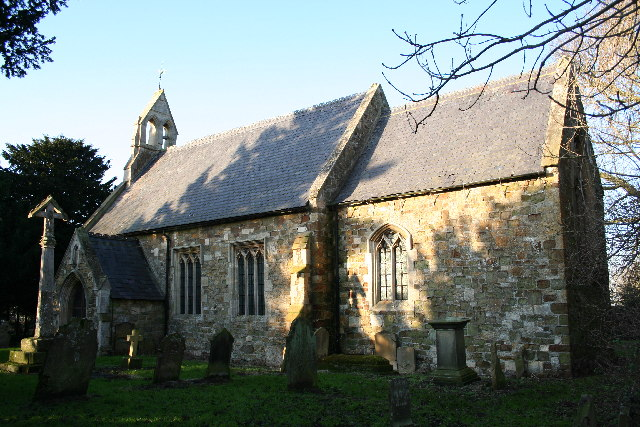
- The Church of St Mary, West Torrington

- Location within Lincolnshire
- Population: 128 (2011)
- OS grid reference: TF135821
  - London: 130 mi (210 km) S
- District: East Lindsey
- Shire county: Lincolnshire
- Region: East Midlands
- Country: England
- Sovereign state: United Kingdom
- Post town: Market Rasen
- Postcode district: LN8
- Police: Lincolnshire
- Fire: Lincolnshire
- Ambulance: East Midlands
- UK Parliament: Gainsborough (UK Parliament constituency)

West Torrington is a small hamlet in the East Lindsey district of Lincolnshire, England. It is situated on the edge of Bleasby Moor and 3 miles (4.8 km) north from Wragby. The 2001 Census recorded a West Torrington population of 69, increasing to 128 at the 2011 census.

The village is a setting in Sebastian Faulks' 2005 novel Human Traces.

== The Church of St Mary ==
The village church, the Church of St Mary, is a Grade II listed building. Its churchyard cross is a Scheduled Ancient Monument. St Mary's is known as Gilbert of Sempringham's other Church. He was the vicar here from 1123 to 1189 after his father, Jocelin, gave him both the vacant churches of Sempringham and West Torrington:

"Gilbert was a lover of truth and justice, chastity and sobriety, and a diligent cultivator of the other virtues: wherefore he was revered and praised by all and obtained their favour and regard. Even Jocelin now rejoiced in the goodness of his son, he began to cherish him with fatherly affection, and ministered to his needs out of his own riches" He presented him to the vacant churches of Sempringham and West Torrington which he had built on his own demesne 'in the custom of his country".

Thomas Wimberley Mossman (1826–1885) was the vicar of West Torrington from 1859 to 1885. He was responsible for the restoration of the church, using parts of the earlier medieval church on the same site and was an important and controversial figure in the Oxford Movement, a correspondent of Cardinal Newman, founder of Brotherhood training poor men for the priesthood, noted historian, active Liberal politician and crucial figure in the early Order of Corporate Reunion and Oecumenical movement. His gravestone, placed on the south side of the churchyard next to the churchyard cross is grade II listed.

In 2020, a campaign was launched by villagers to save the village church, The Church of St Mary, for use as a multi-purpose community & heritage hub. It had been closed for worship in 2011, placed on the market in 2012 but had failed to sell. It was placed on the market again in September 2020. The village formed a community group in 2020, which is now a registered charity to support the village needs and undertake the work needed to bid for the church on the village's behalf. At the time of writing (February 2021) the church is under offer to the village.

== The Manor of West Torrington ==
In the early 17th century the manor belonged to George St Poll of Snarford. In his will of 1612, he left the manor, along with several others, to his wife Frances. By 1618, Frances had remarried and she and her new husband, the Earl of Warwick, granted the manor to her first husband's other heir, another George St Poll.

The ’Great Torrington’ estate in Lincolnshire was purchased by Sir Robert Ainslie and his brother George in 1789. Sir Robert Ainslie was at the time the ambassador to the Ottoman Empire and living in Constantinople. George Ainslie was a general in the British army and was Lieutenant Governor of the Scilly Isles. The Ainslie Baronetcy of Great Torrington was created for Sir Robert. General George Ainslie died in 1804 and Robert in 1812 at which point West Torrington passed to George's son, Robert Sharpe Ainslie. Ainslie however did not live in the village, preferring London.

The estate was sold after Robert Sharpe Ainslie's death in 1858. Roger Sharpley, a farmer from Great Carlton near Louth purchased the Torrington part of Ainslie's estate for 56,200l at a sale in Stamford on 18 November 1858.

Roger Sharpley died in 1866 and his son Anthony, who was living in Ivy Cottage in West Torrington at that point, became Lord of the Manor, he is listed as such in the 1876 Post Office Directory. In 1877 a notice appeared in the Stamford Mercury that the West Torrington manor and lordship would be up for sale as part of the Estate of John Booth Sharpley, who was Anthony's uncle and had died in 1872. Anthony himself died at the age of 42 on 20 March 1879.

Edmund Turnor bought the manor from the Sharpleys, he is lord of the manor in 1889. In 1905 his nephew Christopher is lord. Christopher H Turnor of Stoke Rochford is still lord of the manor in the 1913 Kelly's Directory. In 1917, rents were low and landowners in Lincolnshire with more than one residence sold off some of their land. Turnor, who lived mainly at Stoke Rochford Hall, sold his Panton estate in August. West Torrington was not part of the sale and Turnor continued to appear as lord of the manor in later directories. C. H. Turnor died in August 1940 and his nephew Major Herbert Broke Turnor inherited. Major Turnor's daughter Rosemary, married to Alastair McCorquodale, inherited her father's estates. She died in 2015. She had two children: Sarah and Neil Edmund McCorquodale.
