= Church economy =

Church economy is either

- An Eastern Orthodox bishop's discretionary power to dispense with rules that parish priests must otherwise rigidly follow; see economy (Eastern Orthodoxy); or
- Church economics. (disambiguation)
