= Frederick Lee (priest) =

English cleric and author, (1832–1902)

Frederick George Lee (6 January 1832 in Thame, Oxfordshire – 22 January 1902 at Lambeth, London) was a priest of the Church of England and a religious author. He co-founded the Order of Corporate Reunion.

== Biography ==
Lee was trained in Cuddesdon Theological College and ordained to priesthood in 1856 by the Bishop of Oxford, Samuel Wilberforce. Lee became, together with Ambrose de Lisle and others, a co-founder of the Association for the Promotion of the Unity of Christendom (APUC) in 1857. In Aberdeen, he had difficulties with the bishop concerning his ritualistic practices; he later became vicar of All Saints' Lambeth (York Street/Leake Street), London.

In 1874, Lee, John Thomas Seccombe, and Thomas Wimberley Mossman founded a clandestine Anglo-Papalist society, the Order of Corporate Reunion, to continue the work of the APUC and to restore an apostolic succession recognised by the Roman Catholic Church through re-ordinations, as a means for reunion. Lee is believed to have been secretly consecrated as a bishop by some Roman Catholic prelates whose names were kept secret until 2000. Lee styled himself Bishop of Dorchester for a while and performed some ordinations, but later became disillusioned and believed that he made a mistake.

In the late 1880s, Lee was a member of the Order of the White Rose, the club that sparked the Neo-Jacobite Revival in the United Kingdom. On 11 December 1901, Lee was received into the Roman Catholic Church, shortly before his death.

In addition to his published sermons, books, and literary work, Lee edited numerous periodicals during his career, including The Union Newspaper (1856–1862), The Scottish Miscellany (1860–1861), The Union Review (1863–1869), The Church News (1867–1869), The Church Herald (1870), The Lambeth Review (1872), The Reunion Magazine (1877–1879, four numbers issued irregularly).

== Works ==
- Poems, 1850, 1854 (2nd ed.)
- The Martyrs of Vienne and Lyons: A Prize Poem Recited in the Theatre, Oxford, June 28, 1854
- Our Village and Its Story, with a Postscript: Verses, 1855
- The Progress of the Church: A Sermon, 1857
- Until the Day Break: A Sermon Preached in Substance at the Mission Church of S. Saviour, Wellclose Square, S. George's-in-the-East, Diocese of London, 1857
- Death, Judgment, Hell, and Heaven: Four Advent Sermons, 1858
- Refrain from These Men: A Sermon, 1859
- The Cheyne Case: A Letter to Adam Urquhart, 1860
- The Gospel Message: A Series of Original Sermons (editor, 1860)
- A Statement of Facts, with Regard to His Resignation of the Incumbency of St. John's, Aberdeen, 1861
- Clinton Maynard: A Tale of the World, the Flesh, and the Devil, 1862
- Frederick Lee, ed. (1854). The Communion Office, for the Use of the Church of Scotland. D. Chalmers. [i. e. Episcopal Church of Scotland
- Prayers for the Reunion of Christendom (edit.), 1863
- The Message of Reconciliation: Four Advent Sermons, 1864
- Sermons on the Reunion of Christendom (edit.), 1864
- Directorium Anglicanum, 1865 (2nd ed.), 1878 (4th ed.) Also online from Archive.org
- Paraphrastica expositio articulorum Confessionis Anglicanae, 1865 (editor)
- Manual of devotions for the blessed sacrament. London: J.T. Hayes. 1866.
- Notitia Liturgica, 1866
- Morning and Evening Prayers Specially Intended for Children, together with Devotions for the Holy Sacrifice, 1866
- The King's Highway, 1866, 1872 (2nd ed.)
- Altar Service Book, 3 vol., 1867
- Essays on the Reunion of Christendom (edit.), 1867
- Mary, the Mother of God, 1868
- Sermons, Parochial and Occasional, 1868
- Petronilla, and Other Poems, 1869
- The "Sour Grapes" of Dis-union: A Sermon Preached in Substance at All Saints' Church, Lambeth, 1869
- The Validity of the Holy Orders of the Church of England Maintained and Vindicated: Both Theologically and Historically, with Foot-notes, Tables of Consecrations, and Appendices. J.T. Hayes. 1869.
- The Beauty of Holiness: Ten Lectures on External Religious Observances, 1860, 1869 (4th ed.)
- Confidence in God: A Sermon, 1871
- Our Duty to the Departed: A Sermon, 1871
- A Dictionary of Ritual and Other Ecclesiastical Terms, 1871
- The Abolition and Rejection of the Athanasian Creed: A Letter, 1872
- The Christian Doctrine of Prayer for the Departed, 1872
- Rest in Death: A Funeral Sermon on the Decease of the Rev. John Purchas, 1872
- Manuale Clericorum, 1874
- The Bells of Botteville Tower and Other Poems, 1874
- The Other World, Or Glimpses of the Supernatural, 1875
  - volume one
  - volume two
- Memorials of R. S. Hawker (edit.), 1876
- A Glossary of Liturgical and Ecclesiastical Terms, 1877
- Pastoral Letter by the Rector, Provincials, and Provosts of the Order of Corporate Reunion, 1877
- The Repeal of the Public Worship Regulation Act: A Letter, 1877
- More Glimpses of the World Unseen, 1878
- Historical Sketches of the Reformation, 1879
- The Words from the Cross: Seven Sermons, 1879
- The Church under Queen Elizabeth, 1880
  - volume one
  - volume two
  - "new and cheaper edition" 1897
- Hymns for Several Occasions, together with a Litany for the Faithful Departed, 1880
- Order out of Chaos: Three Sermons Preached at All Saints', Lambeth, 1881
- Reginald Barentyne, or Liberty without Limit: A Tale of the Times, 1881, 1883 (2nd ed.)
- The History, Description and Antiquities of the Prebendal Church of the Blessed Virgin Mary of Thame. Mitchell and Hughes. 1883.
- From Crown to Crown: A Tale of the Early Church, 1885
- Glimpses in the Twilight, 1885
- King Edward the Sixth, Supreme Head, 1886
- On Fads and Fadmongers, 1887
- Immodesty in Art: An Expostulation and Suggestion, 1887
- Reginald Pole: Cardinal Archbishop of Canterbury: An Historical Sketch with an Introductory Prologue and Practical Epilogue, 1888
- A Manual of Politics, 1889
- The Sinless Conception of the Mother of God, 1891
- Sights and Shadows, 1894
- De Profundis: Various Verses, 1899
- The Ecclesiastical Situation in 1899, from a Tractarian Standpoint, 1899
