= Canon law of the Eastern Orthodox Church =

The canon law of the Eastern Orthodox Church consists of the ecclesiastical regulations recognised by the authorities of the Eastern Orthodox Church, together with the discipline, study, and practice of Eastern Orthodox jurisprudence.

In the Eastern Orthodox Church, canon law is a behavioural standard that aims to apply dogma to practical situations in the daily life of Eastern Orthodox Christians. According to Mihai Vasile, unlike the canon law of the Catholic Church, Eastern Orthodox canon law is corrective rather than prescriptive, which means it is formulated in response to certain questions, challenges, or situations.

Eastern Orthodox canon law is the formalised part of the divine law, and ultimately aims to promote the "spiritual perfection" of church members.

The canon law of the Eastern Orthodox Church is uncodified; its corpus has never been organised or harmonised into a formal code of ecclesiastical law. Consequently, some canons of Eastern Orthodoxy contradict each other, such as those related to the reception of heretics in the Church and the validity of their sacraments.

== Definition ==
Eastern Orthodox canon law is "a standard for behavior" and "the attempt to apply dogma to practical situation in the daily life of each [Eastern Orthodox] Christian". Eastern Orthodox canon law is "the formalized part of divine law".

Viscuso writes that the Eastern Orthodox canon law expresses two realities. Theologically, it is the expression of "God's truth given the time and circumstances"; ecclesiologically, it is the expression of the Eastern Orthodox Church's "pastoral life" and the Eastern Orthodox Church's history. He says Eastern Orthodox canon law "is incarnational; the truth is being applied to or incarnated in specific circumstances of history."

== Sources ==
Eastern Orthodox canon law has three sources:

- the Bible
- Church legislations (both written rules and oral traditions)
- ecclesiastical customs

Eastern Orthodox believe that the Bible contains no "detailed system of Church organization"; the role of the Bible in Eastern Orthodox canon law is that it "embodies principles of Christian doctrine from which rules may be extrapolated for solving disciplinary problems within the Church–but only the Church itself may do that". Church legislations are composed of the local councils and the Ecumenical councils. Ecclesiastical customs are not the Holy Tradition, because ecclesiastical customs are a source for Church discipline whereas the Holy Tradition is a source for dogma. In order for a custom to be part of E. O. canon law, it "must have been observed for a long time, it must have been freely subscribed to, and it must be in conformity with principles of faith and order."

=== Canons ===
In the Eastern Orthodox Church, canons are "ecclesiastical norms issued by the Church through the collective voice of the bishops gathered in ecumenical or local synods, speaking through the inspiration of the Holy Spirit and in agreement with Christ's teaching and the dogmas of the Church. In addition, the Fathers of the Church issued canons or wrote letters that eventually came to be considered entirely or partially canonical. [...] A special place in [Eastern Orthodox] Canon Law is given to the [eighty-five] Canons of the Holy Apostles, attributed to the Apostles and collected in different works." All Eastern Orthodox Christians must mandatorily obey the canons.

Most Eastern Orthodox canons are the disciplinary, or penitential, canons; those canons primarily concern wrongdoings and sins. Other types of canons are those which deal with administrative and dogmatic matters. Many of the administrative canons are not very different from secular laws and regulations, because those canons were issued as a result of interactions between the Church and the State.

Canons which concern administrative or disciplinary matters – which are most canons – are not considered to be infallible, and can therefore be changed or reinterpreted by an ecumenical council.

Some canons are considered as infallible and therefore unchangeable: those are "council definitions which speak about an article of the Christian faith", as well as "[s]ome canons of a moral and ethical character [...] whose meaning is absolute and eternal and whose violation can in no way be justified" like the canons forbidding simony.

Some Eastern Orthodox theologians refer to the Eastern Orthodox canons as "holy canons".

=== Other legislations ===
The canon 2 of the in Trullo council establishes that the official canonical sources are: the Apostles, ecumenical and local councils, and Patristic writings. However, along with those, at various points in time the Eastern Orthodox Church has given canonical authority to numerous other sources: "civil legislations, rulings of patriarchs, acts of synods, canonical commentaries, canonical works in various forms including nomokanons, canonical responses, and others."

Along with the canons, autocephalous Eastern Orthodox Churches, "as well as other branches of the Church, issued their own canonical decrees, which mainly deal with the organization, the relationships and customs of the local churches." Those autocephalous Churches also issued decrees on the life of the Eastern Orthodox Church, as well as on those autocephalous churches' particular aspects of their order and discipline. Those legislations also part of Eastern Orthodox canon law.

The Tradition of the Eastern Orthodox Church also contributed to the corpus of ecclesiastical norms of Eastern Orthodox canon law, by providing truths of faith that eventually became universally accepted.

In Eastern Orthodox canon law, a canonical epistle is a commentary from a bishop on some issue which was given the status of canon law.

=== Hierarchy ===
There is a hierarchy among the sources of Eastern Orthodox canon law.

Canons are considered as the "ecclesiastical enactment of the highest authorities in the Church" as well as "revealed truth of Christ and Scriptures, sometimes mediated by spiritual fathers' experience"; there is a hierarchy among them. Canons issued by ecumenical councils are the most important ones; they are followed in importance by those issued by local councils; the last canons in importance are those issued by Church Fathers.

As for the rules and decrees issued by individual Eastern Orthodox churches, they have a local, not universal application; therefore, they are considered as "advisory rules."

The 85 Canons of the Holy Apostles hold a "special place" in Eastern Orthodox canon law.

== Non-codification ==
The canon law of the Eastern Orthodox Church is not codified; the corpus of Eastern Orthodox canon law "was never streamlined or organized into a formal code of ecclesiastical law (as in the Roman Catholic Church)." Some hierarchs, priests and theologians have encouraged a codification in the past, but their will "did not go beyond the level of desire". Some canons of the Eastern Orthodox canon law contradict each others, such as those related to the reception of heretics in the Church and the validity of their sacraments.

Since there is no universal codification of Eastern Orthodox canon law, a great importance is given to the local legislation of each Eastern Orthodox Church. Eastern Orthodox Christians consider the canon 39 of the Quinisext council of 691 ("For our God-bearing fathers also declared that the customs of each church should be preserved") has recognised the right of each local Church to have its own special laws or regulations. However, those laws or regulations must always reflect the spirit of the Eastern Orthodox Church's universal law as found in the canons.

== History ==
Most canons of the Eastern Orthodox canon law were issued as a response to some specific dogmatic or moral question, or to deviation, which happened in the history of the Eastern Orthodox Church; the very existence of those canons as well as their particular formulation is due to some specific controversies in History.

The first canon of the Council of Chalcedon states it is imperative for the whole Eastern Orthodox Church to obey all previously formulated canons.

Legislations taken from patristic writings were first introduced into the legislation of the Eastern Orthodox Church through the work of the 6th-century Patriarch John Scholasticus of Constantinople, in his influential collection of ecclesiastical canons called the Synagoge of Ecclesiastical Canons Divided into 50 Titles. In this collection divided into 50 titles according to ecclesiastical hierarchy, Scholasticus included: all the canons of the Eastern Ecumenical and local councils, the 85 Apostolic canons, the canons of the Synod of Serdica, and the 68 canons from St. Basil which were derived from his second and third canonical epistles.

Canon 1 of the Nicea II council "provides recognition of canonical sources." This canon states that fidelity is to be observed toward all previous canons. In the second canon of the same council, it is stated it is required for any bishop at his consecration to solemnly vow his allegiance to the canons.

The presence of a canon in an Eastern Orthodox canon collection does not mean that said canon was in force at the time it was put in the collection. This is because some canonical collections are made to record institutions and practice which had ceased to exist a long time ago. "For example, certain later Byzantine canonical collections speak of the order of penitents (mourners, listeners, prostraters, and those that stand together with) or of the African Church as if these realities of the Early Church continued to exist later in the Middle Ages."

In the late Byzantine period, i.e. from twelfth to fifteenth century, "there were systematic approach to translate the canons into a contemporary application." In contrast, in the modern age the Eastern Orthodox Church "has no appropriated its receive formal corpus of canon law, generally understood as the canons of ecumenical concils, local councils, and those drawn from patristic writings."

Mihai claims the canons and rules which compose Eastern Orthodox canon law were passed on and preserved without being changed through generations.

== Compilations, core corpus ==
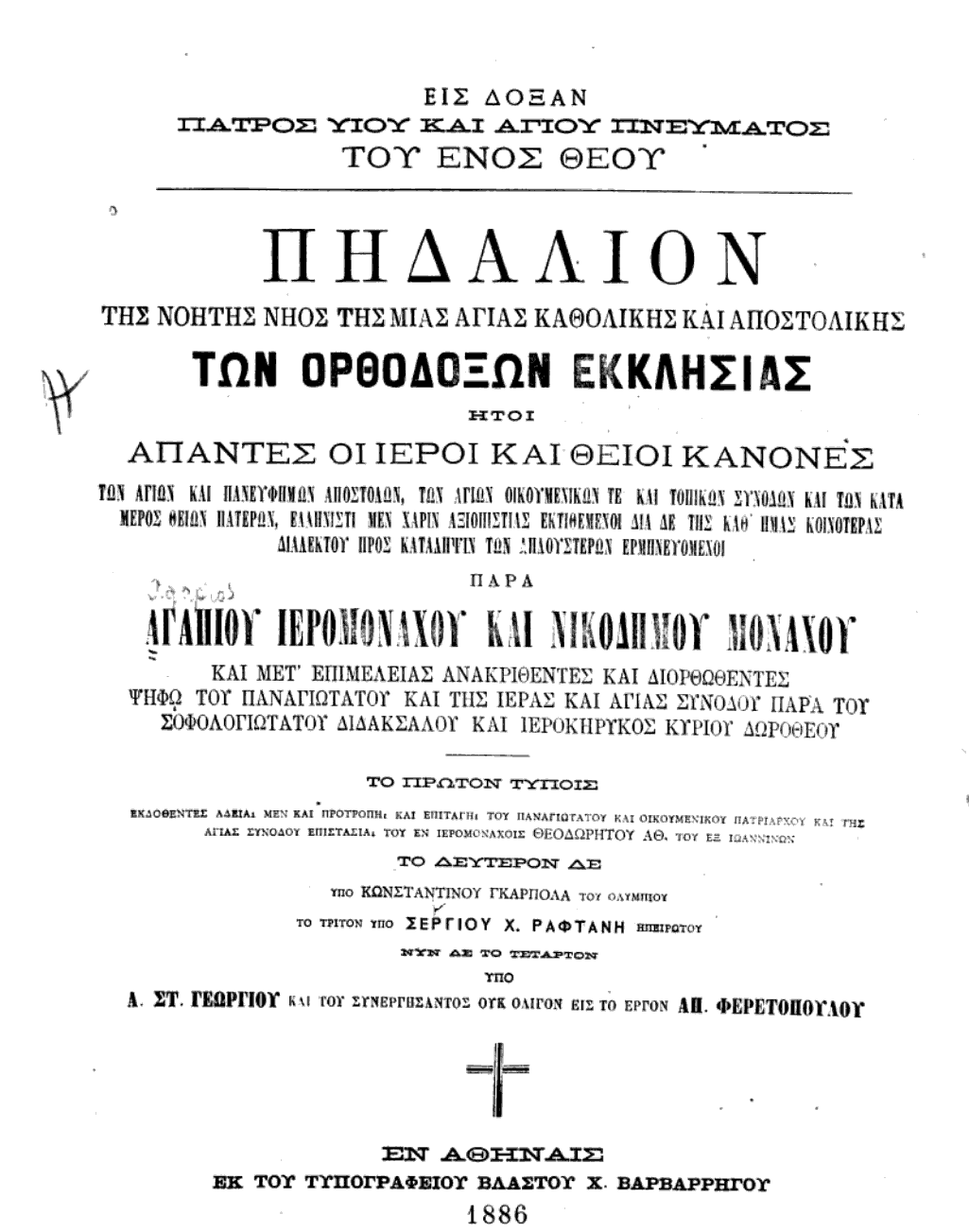
Title page of a 1886 edition of The Rudder, a famous Eastern Orthodox collection of canons.

The canons of the Eastern Orthodox canon law "were issued by the Ecumenical Councils, by regional councils (subsequently ratified by Ecumenical Councils), and by the Fathers of the Church." Those canons were collected and interpreted in The Rudder (19th century) as well as in other collections of canons.

The Rudder was written by St. Nicodemus and St. Agepius, and was first published in 1800. It was later adopted by Patriarch Neophytos VII of Constantinople and his Endemic synod as an official canon law collection. It is currently the most widely used canon law collection in the Greek-speaking Eastern Orthodox Churches.

The general consensus accepts that the core corpus of Eastern Orthodox canon law is a corpus formed in 883: a nomocanon by Photios. This nomocanon of 883 is composed of: the Nomocanon in 14 articles, material taken from the Quinisext Council, edicts from the Nicea II council and of the 861 and 879 synods of Constantinople, and the Epistle of St. Tarasios.

=== List of sources of canons ===
Sources for the canons of the Eastern Orthodox canon law are, according to Mihai:

- Canons of the ecumenical councils
  - Nicaea I (325): 20 canons
  - Constantinople I (381): 7 canons
  - Ephesus (431): 8 canons
  - Chalcedon (341): 30 canons
  - Quinisext council (691): 102 canons
  - Nicaea II (787): 22 canons
- Canons of local councils
  - Carthage (256): 1 canon (Note: Approved by canon 2 of the Quinisext council and the canon 1 of the Nicea II council, according to Mihai p. 36-7.)
  - Ancyra (314): 25 canons
  - Neocaesarea (324 [sic, likely 314]): 15 canons (Note: Approved by canon 2 of the Nicea II council ("c. 2 VII"), according to Mihai p. 36; very likely a typographical error for canon 2 of the Quinisext council ("c. 2 VI").)
  - Gangra (340): 21 canons
  - Antioch (341): 25 canons
  - Laodicea (380): 60 canons
  - Sardica (343): 21 canons
  - Constantinople (394): 1 canons
  - Carthage II (419): 133, 138 or 141 canons depending on the source
  - Council of Constantinople (861): 17 canons
  - Fourth Council of Constantinople (879–880): 3 canons
- Canons of the Church Fathers
  - Dionysius of Alexandria (195–265): 4 canons (Note: Approved by canon 2 of the Quinisext council, according to Mihai p. 37.)
  - Gregory of Neocaesarea (213–270): 11 canons
  - Peter of Alexandria (?–311): 15 canons
  - Athanasius the Great of Alexandria (295-373): 3 canons
  - Basil of Caesarea (330–379): 92 canons
  - Timothy of Alexandria (?–385): 18 canons
  - Gregory the Theologian (?–390): 1 canon
  - Gregory of Nyssa (?–395): 8 canons
  - Amphilochius of Iconium (?–404): 1 canon
  - Theophilus of Alexandria (?–412): 14 canons
  - Cyril of Alexandria (?–444): 5 canons
  - Gennadius of Constantinople (?–471): 1 canon
  - John of Constantinople (?–595): 34, 49, or 65 canons depending on the source (Note: Approved by the Patriarchal synods, according to Mihai p. 37-8.)
  - Tarasius of Constantinople (?–828): 1 canon
  - Theodore of Studium (759–827): 17 canons
  - Nicephorus of Constantinople (?–828): 49 canons
  - Nicholas, Patriarch of Constantinople (?–1111): 11 canons
- Canons attributed to the Apostles
  - Canons of the Holy Apostles: 85 canons

== Juridical specificities ==
In Eastern Orthodox canon law, the canons are considered as "of the Church", therefore they cannot be considered as "positive laws" in a juridical sense. The canons in use in the Eastern Orthodox Church are not exhaustive, as they do not cover every possible aspect of the faith and life of the Church.

The nature of E.O. canon law is corrective, not prescriptive; this means E.O. canon law "responds to situations once they have occurred and have affected the value of the Church, rather than anticipating situations before they arrive." Eastern Orthodox canon law is reactive, not proactive. This means that canons were issued in response to "situations and behaviors that deviated from the norms, not for future or potential situations." Through the passage of time, some new sins have come to exist for which there is no canon. It is possible a canonist, "through careful interpretation and association", could recommend an existing canon for a sin of this type; for example, an already existing canon condemning the self-mutilation of one's body may be applied to tattoos or piercings. The interpretation of the canons must be made according to the "mind (intention)" of the Eastern Orthodox Church, and not according to the interpreter's opinion.

The dispenser of the canon(s) can be a bishop, a priest, or a spiritual father.

There are no precedents in Eastern Orthodox canon law. Moreover, each decision in Eastern Orthodox canon law is unique and often private, because of the application of akriveia or economia.

The success of the application of Eastern Orthodox canon law depends on how much the sinner accepts the canon law's corrective measures; the more the sinner accepts, the more successful the application is.

== Penances ==
"Knowing that love rather than fear is the basis of human behavior," E.O. canon law seeks "to personalize penances to suit both the gravity of the sin and the attitude of the penitent."

In Eastern Orthodox canon law, there exists two notions: akriveia and economia. Akriveia, which is harshness, "is the strict application (sometimes even extension) of the penance given to an unrepentant and habitual offender." Economia, which is sweetness, "is a judicious relaxation of the penance when the sinner shows remorse and repentance."

Disciplinary canons are subject to interpretation and to the use of akriveia or economia, because they were given in "for specific situations and in specific contexts that could change over time". In contrast, dogmatic canons are not subject to interpretation or to akriveia or economia. This is because dogmatic canons are considered as "unchangeable, immutable truths of faith".

== Subjects ==
The subjects of Eastern Orthodox canon law are:

the sources of [Eastern Orthodox] canon law, church order, the foundation of new [Eastern] Orthodox churches, the canonization of saints, the ecclesiastical calendar, control for the execution of justice, the ecclesiastical court, marriage regulations, reception of converts from other confessions, the church’s relations with civil authorities, the correlation of church law with civil law, finances, and ownership relations. [Eastern Orthodox canon law] includes the subjects and methods of other theological disciplines: critical analysis (church history), doctrinal teaching (dogmatics), canons of the holy fathers (patristics), baptism, and reception into the church (liturgics).

== Interpretation ==
Eastern Orthodox canons are accepted within the church as not being self-explanatory; the canons cannot be interpreted without taking into account their doctrinal context and praxis, as well as the tradition of piety.

== Goals ==
Eastern Orthodox Christians believe that when Jesus Christ assigned the Eastern Orthodox Church—a society of mortal humans—with the task of saving souls, he obliged the church to have a canon law as a necessary mean for its survival. Eastern Orthodox Christians believe the goal of their canon law is to assist the Eastern Orthodox Church to organise itself, to supervise the orthodoxy of its members, and to prevent factionalism within the Eastern Orthodox Church. In brief, Eastern Orthodox Christians believe Jesus Christ obliged the Eastern Orthodox Church to give itself a set of rules in order for it to survive.

== Comparisons ==
=== Civil law ===
In contrast to what happens in civil law, in Eastern Orthodox canon law "the penalties for canonical transgressions are medicinal and directed towards the spiritual state of the violator as well as the well-being of the Body of Christ, the Church". This is "evidenced by the drastic step of isolating a spiritually destructive member through excommunication."

The sources between Eastern Orthodox canon law and civil law are different; the source for civil law is the secular powers (the ruler, the parliament, or the elected legislative body), while Eastern Orthodox canon law is made by the E. O. Church and the source for E. O. canon law is the will of God. The differences between secular and Eastern Orthodox canon law are also in purpose because the purpose of Eastern Orthodox canon law is humanity's salvation, in time because Eastern Orthodox canon law extends beyond this life into the next life, in scope because Eastern Orthodox canon law includes one's conscience, and in place because Eastern Orthodox canon law applies to the universal Church. Moreover, the philosophy also differs: the Eastern Orthodox canon law's matter is the soul of and sins, while civil law's matter is the breaking of the law. Another difference is that contrarily to secular law, the principle of E. O. canon law is "voluntary obedience and not forced constraints"; the punishments for violating E. O. canon law "are to be voluntarily accepted and followed: they are not forced."

=== Other Christian canon laws ===
According to Mihai Vasile, interpretation of Eastern Orthodox canon law "is based neither on legalism (as in the Roman Catholic Church) nor on logic (as in Protestant churches), but on both intellectual and mystical approaches to God." According to Lewis J. Patsavos, another distinction from Catholic canon law is that the Eastern Orthodox tradition is corrective rather than prescriptive; rather than anticipate a particular situation or hypothetical issue, the canon law of Eastern Orthodoxy is developed in response to events, questions, or circumstances as they arise.

== See also ==
- Ancient church orders
- Collections of ancient canons
- Kormchaia
- Syntagma Canonum
- Stoglav
- Tomos (Eastern Orthodox Church)
- Eastern Orthodox Church organization
- Canonical territory
- Canon law of the Anglican Communion
- Byzantine law
- Typikon
