= Married Priests Now! =

Group advocating for legal priest marriage

Married Priests Now! (MPN!) is an advocacy group founded and formerly led by Emmanuel Milingo, a former Catholic bishop from Zambia. MPN is a liberal Catholic organization calling for relaxing the rules concerning marriage in the Latin Church's priesthood. Milingo has said that "There is no more important healing than the reconciliation of 150,000 married priests with the 'Mother Church', and the healing of a Church in crisis through renewing marriage and family."

== Automatic excommunication ==
Milingo gained international attention in September 2006 when he illicitly ordained four married men (George Augustus Stallings Jr. of Washington, D.C.; Peter Paul Brennan of New York City; Patrick Trujillo of Newark, New Jersey; and Joseph Gouthro of Las Vegas, Nevada) as bishops. Milingo organized two meetings in the fall of 2006 of many married Catholic priests from the US, Europe, South America, and Africa in New Jersey. Partly in response to Milingo's initiative a meeting was held in Rome to discuss whether to change the rule of celibacy. It was decided not to change the rule. Due to Milingo’s excommunication and his connection with the non-Catholic religious leader Sun Myung Moon, two groups of former Catholic priests who are pushing for a married priesthood, issued warnings against MPN.

== Policy of laicizations ==
Archbishop Alain Paul Lebeaupin warned in 2009 that Catholic priests who had joined Married Priests Now! could be laicized by the church, which would add a new penalty to Milingo's latae sententiae excommunication. On December 17, 2009, the Holy See announced that Milingo had been laicized, calling him "Mister Milingo".

== See also ==
- International Federation of Married Catholic Priests
- Call to Disobedience
