= Mexican Catholic Apostolic Church =

Independent Catholic denomination in Mexico

- Iglesia Católica Apostólica Mexicana
- Abbreviation: ICAM
- Classification: Western Christian
- Orientation: Independent Old Catholic
- Polity: Episcopal
- Primas: José Camargo Melo
- Associations: Worldwide Communion of Catholic Apostolic National Churches
- Region: Mexico
- Founder: José Joaquín Pérez Budar
- Origin: 1925; Mexico City, Mexico
- Separated from: Catholic Church in Mexico

The Mexican Catholic Apostolic Church (Spanish: Iglesia Católica Apostólica Mexicana (ICAM)) is an Independent Old Catholic denomination founded in 1925, by separating from the Catholic Church. It was created to bolster revolution with the support of the Regional Confederation of Mexican Workers (CROM) and Mexican President Plutarco Elías Calles' approval. (Note: Pérez attested that the source of the idea to found a national church was Bishop Eduardo Sanchez Camacho.) Its development was marked by several internal crises, followed by consequent splits and mergers. Since 1993, it has been officially listed in the Mexican Federal Registry of Religious Associations.

== Name ==
The church is identified in Spanish as both Iglesia Ortodoxa Católica Apostólica Mexicana (Spanish for Mexican Orthodox Apostolic Catholic Church) and Iglesia Católica Apostólica Mexicana (Spanish for Mexican Catholic Apostolic Church); (Note: Although after his consecration by Carfora, Pérez styled himself Patriarch of the Iglesia Ortodoxa Católica Apostólica Mexicana, Ramirez notes that some official documents do not include the term orthodoxa.) in English it also known as the Old Mexican Roman Catholic Church, and the Mexican National Catholic Church.

== History ==
President Álvaro Obregón and his successor Calles, as well as other politicians, wanted the revolutionary government to restrict and terminate the Catholic Church in Mexico. In February 1925, armed intruders calling themselves the "Knights of the Order of Guadalupe" occupied the church of María de la Soledad in Mexico City where José Joaquín Pérez Budar, a Freemason and former Catholic priest, proclaimed himself the future patriarch of a new national church; (Note: According to Peter Anson, in Bishops at large, an episcopus vagans, Joseph René Vilatte, sponsored schismatic clergy in the 1910s "as a nucleus of a national church" in Mexico. Vilatteville was a precursor of Mexican schisms. Although Pérez's 1925 ICAM was dismissed as a "comic opera reformation," Matthew Butler notes, in The Americas, that previously other schisms had been attempted, such as that of Venustiano Carranza's revolutionaries, and Vilatteville was built in Chihuahua about 15 years before. It is unclear from Butler if Vilatteville influenced Mexican schisms, but Butler noted that Pérez was consecrated by Carfora. Other groups also conducted operations in Mexico. Anthony J. Cross wrote that before the First Vatican Council, the Protestant Episcopal Church in the United States of America "had supported dissident Catholics in Mexico" and its "reform mission", with its links to the Anglo-Continental Society, was "closely related to the growth of American influence and empire." According to Cross, there were "a number of Anglican reform mission interventions in Roman Catholic heartlands" among the 19th century culture wars that were being fought in Germany, Haiti, Italy, Mexico, Portugal, Spain, and Switzerland.) Parishioners attacked the interlopers and rioted the next day; similar riots were incited when other churches in Mexico were occupied by armed intruders that month. (Note: Separatist priests in Coahuila, Hidalgo, Jalisco, State of Mexico, Oaxaca, Puebla, Querétaro, San Luis Potosí, Tabasco, and Veracruz participated in the schism but every bishops and archbishops rejected ICAM.) These armed intruders occupying churches induced a fear of anti-Catholic persecution that led to the formation of the National League for the Defense of Religious Liberty (LNDLR) a militant Catholic defense organization.

Official favoritism of a national church enraged revolutionaries who saw this as a "violation of state laicidad" with potential to cause division in the revolution, so Calles stopped his support of ICAM after about 3 months. Nevertheless, the government failed in 1925 to orchestrate Pérez's consecration by a visiting Eastern Orthodox bishop, (Note: According to Butler, Pérez initially sought consecration through the Anglican Church of Mexico but Butler does not provide details.) but in 1926, North American Old Roman Catholic Church Bishop Carmel Henry Carfora consecrated Pérez, Antonio Benicio López Sierra, and Macario López Valdez as bishops. In 1927, López Sierra established an ICAM church in San Antonio, Texas, (Note: By 1929 Pérez expelled López Sierra after he was accused of embezzlement and rape of a woman inside a church building.) where Archbishop Arthur Jerome Drossaerts, of the Roman Catholic Archdiocese of San Antonio, called the cismáticos (Spanish for schismatics) "designing proselytizers of the sects supported by Calles and the Mexican government, that archenemy of all Christianity;" and in 1929, López Valdes established an ICAM church in Los Angeles, California. Pérez moved his cathedral to San Antonio in March 1930 but in April 1931, Pérez returned to Mexico City.

== Beliefs ==
The ICAM supports clerical marriage, rituals in the vernacular, Communion under both kinds, individual Biblical interpretation, veneration of saints and Mary the mother of Jesus, but opposed the Roman Catholic dogma of papal infallibility, denied eternal damnation, rejected the sacrament of Penance, and had an "experimental commitment to liturgical innovation".

== Expansion technique ==
The government confiscated and nationalized all Catholic Church assets in 1859 and, prior to the 1992 legislation of an amendment to the 1917 Constitution of Mexico, religious institutions were not permitted to own property in Mexico; "the Catholic Church was prevented from conducting any legal transactions in Mexico." Other legal anticlerical restrictions included mandatory civil registration of clergy. When the Calles Law took effect in July 1926, the Catholic Church suspended all public worship and within days the Cristero rebellion began.

Butler described it as Mexican Gallicanism. According to Ramirez, throughout Mexico the population was Catholic but hardly understood the distinction between the Catholic Church and ICAM. ICAM priests searched in several Mexican states for neglected or abandoned church buildings and lobbied local authorities to devolve those church buildings to the ICAM's use. With the understanding that the law provided for the formation of local committees to govern the use of church buildings, local authorities gathered residents in a public place to facilitate the devolution of church buildings, according to Ramirez, and ICAM priests

1. contrasted that
  - the leadership of the Catholic Church openly defied the Calles government and systematically violated law and order
  - the leadership of ICAM was respectful faithful of law and government
2. contrasted that
  - the Catholic Church was characterized as the "Roman Church" which was obedient to a pope – a foreign spiritual leader who lived in Rome, to which considerable Peter's pence is given annually
  - the ICAM was characterized as the "Mexican Church" which was obedient to a patriarch – a Mexican spiritual leader who lived in Mexico
3. convinced people that ICAM dogmas and rituals were the same as those of the Catholic Church

These local committees voted on the devolution of church buildings and on many occasions, after such votes, riots erupted that ended with casualties. This activity provoked the hostility of Catholics and two ICAM priests were killed.

Calles' successor, Emilio Portes Gil, did not support ICAM.

In June 1929, Dwight Morrow, United States Ambassador to Mexico, mediated a modus vivendi between the Mexican episcopate and the Mexican federal government. Portes Gil signed the modus vivendi and soon the Catholic Church resumed public worship in many church buildings throughout Mexico. The federal modus vivendi and the devolution of church buildings to Catholic Church use disconcerted some state and local authorities.

It is uncertain how long ICAM subsisted, according to Ramirez, about 60 priests were ICAM ministers, and between 1925 and 1937, about 70 church buildings, generally in small villages, were returned to ICAM use, but most of those buildings were soon closed. (Note: The reported scope and duration of ICAM varies. Ramirez wrote that according to some research, ICAM had the use of only a few church buildings; they were administered by only 13 priests, of whom 7 reconciled with the Catholic Church and 3 were never ordained; and lasted approximately one year. According to Bailey, the schism consisted of about six parishes and dematerialized within several months.) Ramirez notes that ICAM subsisted through the Cristero rebellion, spread to the southern United States, and survived the end of the Calles government.

Pérez was unable to maintain discipline among the clergy.

ICAM dwindled in Mexico and San Antonio by 1930. Instead of spreading ICAM, according to Ramirez, Pérez's subordinates coveted his position of patriarch and devised ecclesial intrigues.

== After Pérez ==
Pérez died in 1931, days after his public recantation and reconciliation with the Catholic Church.

José Eduardo Dávila Garza became the leader of ICAM and used the religious name Pope Eduardo I.

While Pérez permitted clerical marriage, Dávila rescinded Pérez's approval and required clerical celibacy.

Dávila has his cathedral in the village of San Pedro.

Dávila petitioned Eastern Orthodox patriarchs in the 1930s to recognize him.

The Mexican Apostolic National Church was a Western Rite Orthodox Church in Mexico whose creation was inspired by the relationship between the Soviet Union and the Russian Orthodox Church.

After Pérez died, the individual parishes continued to exist essentially independently,

The entire diocese of this national church was subsumed into the created Orthodox Church in America Exarchate of Mexico in 1972.

== Opinion ==
Ramirez speculated that the ICAM could have succeeded in a scenario where Calles became the head of ICAM, like King Henry VIII of England, because the Mexican Secretariat of the Interior already controlled church buildings and regulated the registration of priests.
