= Association for the Promotion of the Unity of Christendom =

The Association for the Promotion of the Unity of Christendom (APUC) was originally established by Ambrose Lisle March Phillipps De Lisle in 1857 within England to promote unity among Anglicans, Roman Catholics, and Orthodox Christians. Condemned by Cardinal Nicholas Wiseman and defunct by the early twentieth century, two successor organisations descended from it: the Catholic League and the Order of Corporate Reunion—two Anglo-Papalist societies. Since 2023, a branch of the Order of Corporate Reunion incorporated within the United States by Peter Paul Brennan and others reorganized themselves as APUC. The newly established incarnation of APUC seeks reformation or restoration within Anglicanism, Catholicism, and Eastern Orthodoxy.

== Sources ==
- Purcell, Edmund Sheridan. Life and Letters of Ambrose Phillipps de Lisle. Macmillan and Co., Ltd., London, 1900
