= Emil Fairfield Rodriguez =

Mexican bishop

Bishop Emil Fairfield Rodriguez (1912-2005) was the Primate of the Mexican National Catholic Church.

His church was in East Los Angeles, CA, He was consecrated Bishop by The Most Reverend Carlos Duarte Costa in the 1950s. He consecrated Bishop Otilio Gallo in 1996, and Bishop Gallo consecrated Bishop Parnell in 2002 in Los Angeles, CA. The MNCC joined the Worldwide Communion of Catholic and Apostolic Churches in 2008in Sacatepequez, Guatemala. Patriarch Luis Mendez Castillo presided over this Worldwide meeting of Bishops. He reconsecrated Bishop Parnell, Bishop King and Bishop Connell, subcondicione to give a direct Apostolic succession of the Roman Catholic church and full and perfect communion.
