= International Federation of Married Catholic Priests =

The International Federation of Married Catholic Priests was an association of priests who sought to reform existing celibacy rules within the Catholic priesthood in order to allow clergy to engage in their own marriages. It was dissolved in 2008 and changed to a more common reform-based group with a new name and with members other than priests. An organisation with that name currently exists. Their goals include women's ordination, allowing priests to marry and increased participation of the laity in church affairs.

== See also ==
- Call to Disobedience
- Married Priests Now
