= Akribeia =

Eastern Orthodox canon law term

In the Eastern Orthodox Church, akribeia (Greek: ἀκρίβεια, romanized: akriveia, akribia, akrivia, lit. 'accuracy, exactness, preciseness') is the strict adherence to the letter of the law of the Church.

Akribeia is to be distinguished from economy, which is discretionary deviation from the letter of the law in order to adhere to the spirit of the law.

== Canon law ==
In Eastern Orthodox canon law, there are two notions: akriveia and economia. Akriveia, which is harshness, "is the strict application (sometimes even extension) of the penance given to an unrepentant and habitual offender." Economia, which is sweetness, "is a judicious relaxation of the penance when the sinner shows remorse and repentance."

== See also ==
- Antinomianism
- Canon law of the Eastern Orthodox Church
- Legalism (theology)
- Oikonomia (leniency, opposite of akribeia)
