= Order of Corporate Reunion =

Ecumenical association of clergy and laity of Anglican origin

- Christian, Ecumenical, and Fraternal Order of Corporate Reunion
- Emblem of the Order of Corporate Reunion
- Abbreviation: OCR
- Established: 1877; 149 years ago
- Founder: Frederick George Lee, Thomas Wimberley Mossman, John Thomas Seccombe
- Type: Ecumenical association
- Purpose: Reordination
- Headquarters: United Kingdom
- Origins: Oxford Movement
- Prelate: John Kersey
- Superior-General: Robert Chung
- Key people: Federick George Lee; Luigi Nazari di Calabiana; Arnold Harris Mathew; Hugh George de Willmott Newman; Peter Paul Brennan
- Secessions: Order of Corporate Reunion (1911-1912); Order of Corporate Reunion (1998); Order of Corporate Reunion (2016); Association for the Promotion of the Unity of Christendom (2023)
- Website: https://www.ocr1874.org

The Order of Corporate Reunion (OCR), officially the Christian, Ecumenical, and Fraternal Order of Corporate Reunion, was an ecumenical association of clergy and laity of Anglican origin. The OCR was initially founded by Frederick George Lee, Thomas Wimberley Mossman, and John Thomas Seccombe between 1874-1877 in London. Established as an Anglo-Papalist society to continue the work of the Association for the Promotion of the Unity of Christendom, its founders sought to restore an apostolic succession recognized by the Catholic Church through reordinations as a means for reunion.

The founders of the Order of Corporate Reunion claimed to have been consecrated as bishops. However, they did not state in public the names of their consecrators. Over a century after their deaths it was revealed that bishops Luigi Nazari di Calabiana allegedly consecrated Mossman; Domenico Agostini allegedly consecrated Lee alongside Armenian Catholic abbot-bishop Ignazio Ghiurekian; and Seccombe was allegedly consecrated by Jules Ferrette of the Ancient British Church.

Following the deaths of its founders, the order fell dormant until it was revived between 1911-1912 by Arnold Harris Mathew. Prominent members and leaders of the revived order and its successive organizations were believed to have included Hugh George de Willmott Newman and Peter Paul Brennan. As of 2016, the revived Order of Corporate Reunion's leadership has been disputed among at least 3 separate organizations. In 2023, the organization associated with the Apostolic Episcopal Church received a registered trademark with the United States Patent and Trademark Office.

== History ==
=== Foundation and dormancy ===
Following the dissolution of the Association for the Promotion of the Unity of Christendom, the Order of Corporate Reunion was established in response to Apostolicae curae, which declared all Anglican ordinations "absolutely null and utterly void". Its founders were Frederick George Lee, Thomas Wimberley Mossman, and John Thomas Seccombe. Its founders claimed to have been consecrated as bishops through clergy from the Latin and Armenian Catholic churches, and the Ancient British Church.

During the initial existence of the Order of Corporate Reunion, Bertil Person claims that Richard Williams Morgan and Charles Isaac Stevens were both consecrated within the OCR on 6 March 1879. Morgan had been previously consecrated by Jules Ferrette of the Ancient British Church. According to Church of England priest Henry R. T. Brandreth, however, "it is very unlikely, however, that any of the OCR bishops performed a consecration" of Stevens.

According to one claimed successor of the original OCR, following Arnold Mathew's controversy with the Old Catholic Churches of Utrecht; he was conditionally ordained and consecrated in November 1909 by Frederick Cornwallis Conybeare. Conybeare was allegedly consecrated in 1894 by Lee, Mossman, and Seccombe. In 1908, Lee's son claimed that his father conditionally consecrated Mossman and Seccombe; this was disputed by others and considered inconsistent with an explicit statement by Frederick George Lee.

Becoming later disillusioned with the OCR and believing that he had made a mistake, Lee was received into the Catholic Church, shortly before his death. Mossman and Seccombe were also received into the Catholic Church, yet neither of the three were formally recognized as bishops. Following their deaths, the original order fell dormant until its revival between 1911 and 1912.

=== Revivals and schisms ===
Arnold Mathew—a former Roman Catholic, Anglican, and Old Catholic turned Independent or Old Roman Catholic bishop—re-established the OCR. According to Brandreth, it "seems still to exist in a shadowy underground way" in 1947, but disconnected. Colin Holden, through Ritualist on a Tricycle, placed Mathew and his attempted revival of the OCR into perspective, writing that Mathew was an episcopus vagans, lived in a cottage provided for him, and performed his conditional OCR acts in this cottage—sometimes called according to Holden, "bedroom ordinations".

Mathew questioned the validity of Anglican holy orders and became involved with the members of the order—in 1911 according to Edmonds—and he openly advertised his offer to reordain Anglican clergy who requested it, which angered the Church of England. Questioning the validity of Anglican orders, Mathew, in his newspaper The Torch, stated "that the ordinations of the Church of England are not recognized by any church claiming to be Catholic".

According to D. J. Scannell O'Neill's observations of Mathew, the Old Roman Catholic Church of Great Britain, and his revival of the OCR, the "most charitable construction to be placed on this latest move of Mathew is that he is not mentally sound. Being an Irishman, it is strange that he has not sufficient humor to see the absurdity of falling away from the Catholic Church in order to assist others to unite with the Holy See". It was reported that "anything between 4 and 265 was suggested" as to how many took up his offer of reordination through the OCR.

According to one successor body of Mathew's revived OCR, the order grew in the United States of America through the conditional consecration of Ignatius Nichols—a former bishop of the American Orthodox Catholic Church led by Aftimios Ofiesh. This OCR's membership would later claim the membership of Hugh George de Willmott Newman of the Catholicate of the West. Newman would also later become the head of this order, according to the successive claimant.

In 1998, another branch of the OCR was established by Diederik Quatannens; his leadership was succeeded by Bertil Persson. After Persson's retirement, this division of the order was then led by Archbishop Peter Paul Brennan of the Old Catholic Confederation, who died in 2016. During Brennan's primacy, this branch of the OCR was incorporated in Missouri.

Following Brennan's death, Independent Catholic bishop Michael Kline—registered agent of the Missouri corporation—claimed to have been entrusted as Brennan's successor of the revived and branched order by an appointment from Francis Spataro—a former prelate of the OCR—during Brennan's incapacitation; he claimed this appointment after Brennan's alleged silence following personal requests to succeed him; and in 2017, Spataro and other clergy from the Apostolic Episcopal Church formally restated their positions.

In 2019, Spataro reversed his earlier position and appointment of Kline; and he would also consider himself retired from all religious affiliations. In the United Kingdom, the Apostolic Episcopal Church's OCR branch repudiated Kline and his successors' claims in the early 2020s, citing "legally invalid" appointments and lack of documentation. This branch, incorporated in California as Order of Corporate Reunion Corp. and the UK as The Order of Corporate Reunion, has been led by John Kersey—also a claimant successor to the defunct Catholicate of the West, dispenser of the Vilatte orders, and other self-styled nobility.

Upon the retirement of Kline as disputed prelate over the Order of Corporate Reunion in 2021, Dario Calderelli was appointed by him as successor; Kline would later retract his retirement. In 2022, Kline retired again and Richard Cumming was appointed the leader of the branch incorporated in the United States by Brennan, Kline, Persson and Spataro; he would later be deposed by Kline. In 2023, this branch led by Richard Cumming reorganized itself as its predecessor—the Association for the Promotion of the Unity of Christendom. That same year, the branch associated with the John Kersey and the Apostolic Episcopal Church received a registered trademark with the United States Patent and Trademark Office.

== See also ==
- John Edward Bazille-Corbin
