= Benjamin L. Merkle =

American New Testament scholar (born 1971)

Benjamin Lee Merkle (born 1971) is an American New Testament scholar. He is Associate Professor of New Testament and Greek at Southeastern Baptist Theological Seminary. Merkle studied at Kuyper College, Westminster Seminary California, and Southern Baptist Theological Seminary. He served as Professor of New Testament at Malaysia Baptist Theological Seminary before coming to SEBTS.

Merkle specializes in the issue of eldership, and has written The Elder and Overseer: One Office in the Early Church (2003), 40 Questions about Elders and Deacons (2008), and Why Elders? A Biblical and Practical Guide for Church Members (2009). He argues that elders and bishops are the same in the New Testament and "normally function in plurality in a local church."

Merkle also argues for gender distinctions on the basis of 1 Corinthians 11.

== Works ==
=== Books ===
- Merkle, Benjamin L. (2003). The Elder and Overseer: one office in the early church. Studies in biblical literature. Vol. 57. New York: Peter Lang. ISBN 9780820462349. OCLC 50192542.
- ——— (2008). 40 Questions about Elders and Deacons. Grand Rapids, MI: Kregel Publications. ISBN 9780825433641. OCLC 172980402.
- ——— (2009). Why elders? : a biblical and practical guide for church members. Grand Rapids, MI: Kregel Publications. ISBN 9780825433511. OCLC 320434753.
- ——— (2016). Ephesians. Exegetical Guide to the Greek New Testament. Nashville, TN: B&H Publishing Group. ISBN 9781433676116. OCLC 929590220.
- ———; Plummer, Robert L. (2017). Greek for Life: strategies for learning, retaining, and reviving New Testament Greek. Grand Rapids, MI: Baker Academic. ISBN 9780801093203. OCLC 961153121.

=== Edited by ===
- ———; Schreiner, Thomas R., eds. (2014). Shepherding God's Flock: biblical leadership in the New Testament and beyond. Grand Rapids, MI: Kregel Publications. ISBN 9780825442568. OCLC 881313167.
