= Corpus Juris =

Legal term meaning body of law

The legal term Corpus Juris means "body of law".

It was originally used by the Romans for several of their collections of all the laws in a certain field—see Corpus Juris Civilis—and was later adopted by medieval jurists in assembling the Corpus Juris Canonici.

Later the term was used for comprehensive collections of laws in the US, as in Corpus Juris Secundum. The term is commonly used to refer to the entire body of law of a country, jurisdiction, or court, such as "the corpus juris of the Supreme Court of the United States."

The phrase has been used in the European Union to describe the possibility of a European Legal Area, a European Public Prosecutor and a European Criminal Code. Eurosceptics in the United Kingdom attacked the plans, which they saw as a threat to the criminal law traditions of some member states, such as jury trials by independent juries, habeas corpus, and prohibitions against double jeopardy.

== See also ==
- Acquis
- Regulæ Juris
