= Economy (religion) =

Term with multiple meanings in Christian theology

In the Eastern Orthodox Church, Catholic Church, and in the teachings of the Church Fathers which undergirds the theology of those communions, economy or oeconomy (Greek: οἰκονομία, oikonomia) has several meanings. The basic meaning of the word is "handling" or "disposition" or "management" of a thing, or more literally "housekeeping", usually assuming or implying good or prudent handling (as opposed to poor handling) of the matter at hand. In short, economia is a discretionary deviation from the letter of the law in order to adhere to the spirit of the law and charity. This is in contrast to legalism, or akribia (Greek: ακριβεια), which is strict adherence to the letter of the law of the church.

== Eastern Orthodoxy ==
=== Divine economy ===
The divine economy, in Eastern Orthodoxy, not only refers to God's actions to bring about the world's salvation and redemption, but to all of God's dealings with, and interactions with, the world, including the Creation.

According to Lossky, theology (literally, "words about God" or "teaching about God") was concerned with all that pertains to God alone, in himself, i.e. the teaching on the Trinity, the divine attributes, and so on; but it was not concerned with anything pertaining to the creation or the redemption. Lossky writes: "The distinction between οικονομια [economy] and θεολογια [theology] [...] remains common to most of the Greek Fathers and to all of the Byzantine tradition. θεολογια [...] means, in the fourth century, everything which can be said of God considered in Himself, outside of His creative and redemptive economy. To reach this 'theology' properly so-called, one therefore must go beyond [...] God as Creator of the universe, in order to be able to extricate the notion of the Trinity from the cosmological implications proper to the 'economy.' "

=== Ecclesiastical economy ===
The Ecumenical Patriarchate considers that through "extreme oikonomia [economy]", those who are baptized in the Oriental Orthodox, Roman Catholic, Lutheran, Old Catholic, Moravian, Anglican, Methodist, Reformed, Presbyterian, Church of the Brethren, Assemblies of God, or Baptist traditions can be received into the Eastern Orthodox Church through the sacrament of Chrismation and not through re-baptism.

=== Canon law ===
In the canon law of the Eastern Orthodox Church, the notions of akriveia and economia (economy) also exist. Akriveia, which is harshness, "is the strict application (sometimes even extension) of the penance given to an unrepentant and habitual offender." Economia, which is sweetness, "is a judicious relaxation of the penance when the sinner shows remorse and repentance."

== Catholicism ==
According to the Catechism of the Catholic Church:

The Fathers of the Church distinguish between theology (theologia) and economy (oikonomia). "Theology" refers to the mystery of God's inmost life within the Blessed Trinity and "economy" to all the works by which God reveals himself and communicates his life. Through the oikonomia the theologia is revealed to us; but conversely, the theologia illuminates the whole oikonomia. God's works reveal who he is in himself; the mystery of his inmost being enlightens our understanding of all his works. So it is, analogously, among human persons. A person discloses himself in his actions, and the better we know a person, the better we understand his actions.

== See also ==
- The Economy of God
- Economy of Salvation
- Dispensation (Catholic Church)
