= Peter Paul Brennan =

American Old Catholic archbishop (1941-2016)

The Most Reverend Peter Paul Brennan
- Archbishop of the Old Catholic Confederation
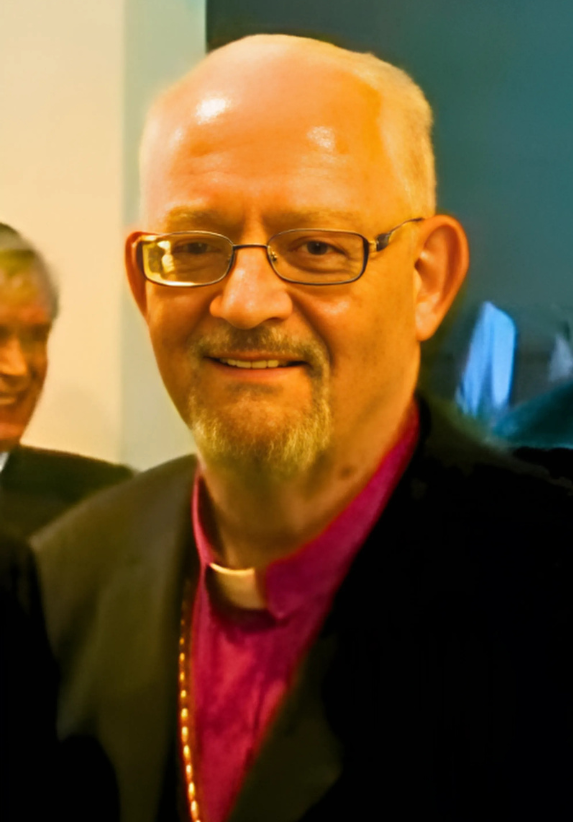
- Brennan in 2014
- Church: African Orthodox Church, Ecumenical Catholic Diocese of the Americas

Orders
- Consecration: September 24, 2006 by Emmanuel Milingo

Personal details
- Born: November 1, 1941 New York State
- Died: August 1, 2016 (aged 74)
- Denomination: Independent Catholicism

Peter Paul Brennan (November 1, 1941 – August 1, 2016) was an American bishop. He was archbishop of the Old Catholic Confederation and primate of the Ecumenical Catholic Diocese of the Americas—presently named the Good Shepherd Companions. He was also a bishop of the African Orthodox Church, prelate of the Order of Corporate Reunion, and president of Married Priests Now!—founded by excommunicated Roman Catholic archbishop Emmanuel Milingo.

== Biography ==
Brennan was born on November 1, 1941, in New York State; in his adulthood, he attended St. John's Atonement Seminary, which closed in 1967. He also attended St. Pius X Seminary and Immaculate Conception Seminary, and graduated with a M.A. in education from Manhattan College. Leaving the Roman Catholic Church and pursuing ordination after marriage, Brennan was ordained a priest in 1972 through the Old Roman Catholic Church by Richard Arthur Marchenna.

In 1978, he was consecrated as a bishop within the African Orthodox Church founded by George Alexander McGuire; he was then conditionally consecrated variously after. By 1984, Brennan led the Ecumenical Catholic Diocese of the Americas which remarries divorced individuals, practices open communion, ordains women, and affirms and ordains lesbian, gay, bisexual and transgender individuals into holy orders. The Ecumenical Catholic Diocese of the Americas would then become the Good Shepherd Companions, an Independent Old Catholic network of house churches. In 2006, he was consecrated a bishop "sub conditione", with four other married priests including George Augustus Stallings, by Emmanuel Milingo—then Roman Catholic archbishop of Lusaka in Zambia. As these episcopal ordinations were done without papal approval, Milingo was excommunicated and eventually laicized.

Regarding Brennan's consecration by Milingo, the Holy See Press Office declared in a carefully worded statement that: "While expressing hope for their conversion, the Church reaffirms what was declared on 26 September 2006, namely that she does not recognize these ordinations, nor does she intend to recognize them, or any subsequent ordinations based on them, in the future. Hence the canonical status of the supposed bishops remains as it was prior to the ordination conferred by Archbishop Milingo."

This denial of canonical status meant that though Brennan had no authority to exercise any ministry in the Roman Catholic Church, he was still a valid bishop, along with the other bishops excommunicated by Rome. As of November 2006, Roman canon lawyers stated such ceremonies were valid. The Reverend Ciro Benedettini of the Holy See Press Office, who was responsible for publicly issuing the press conference communique on Milingo, told reporters that any ordinations or consecrations that the excommunicated Milingo had performed prior to his laicization were "illicit but valid", while any following would be invalid.

On June 11, 2011, the Pontifical Council for Legislative Texts issued a statement about illicitly ordained bishops, pointing out the canons which provide for an automatic latae sententiae excommunication for both the ordaining bishop and those ordained. Bishop Juan Ignacio Arrieta, secretary of the council, explained that the statement applied to the bishops ordained by Milingo as well as to more recent cases in the Chinese Patriotic Association.

After the resignation of Bertil Persson as leader of the Order of Corporate Reunion, Brennan succeeded as prelate. Brennan died on August 1, 2016, and was subsequently succeeded by Michael Kline and John Kersey as disputed prelates of the Order of Corporate Reunion.
