= Christianity in Russia =

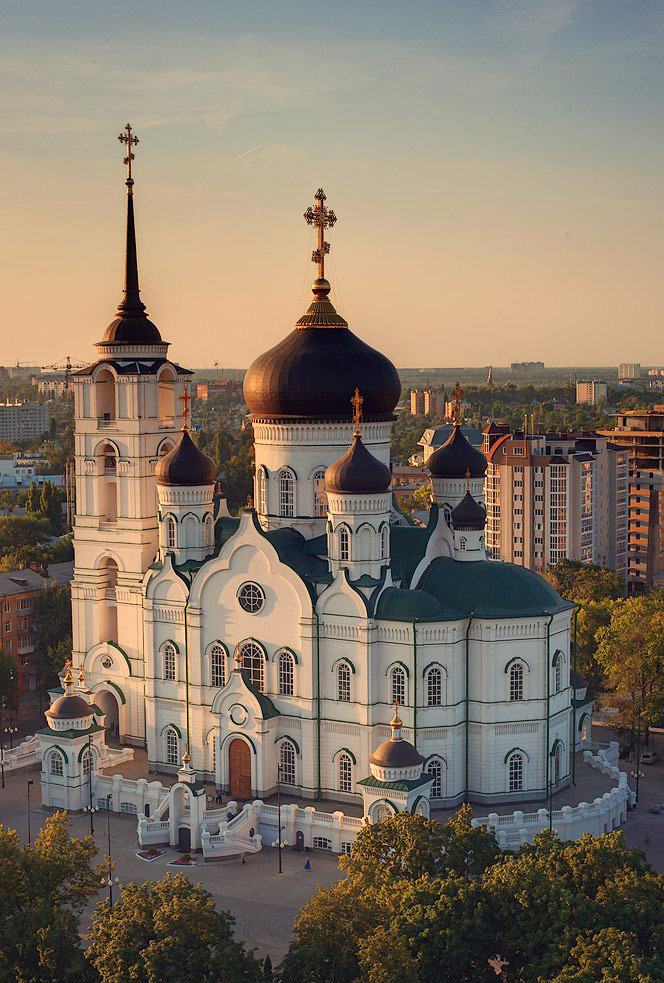
Russian Orthodox Annunciation Cathedral in Voronezh.

Christianity in Russia is the most widely professed religion in the country. The largest tradition is the Russian Orthodox Church. According to official sources, there are 170 eparchies of the Russian Orthodox Church, 145 of which are grouped in metropolitanates. There are from 500,000 to one million Old Believers, who represent an older form of Russian Orthodox Christianity, and who separated from the Orthodox Church in the 17th century as a protest against Patriarch Nikon's church reforms.

The Catholic Church estimates that there are from 600,000 to 1.5 million Catholics in the country, exceeding government estimates of about 140,000. There is one Catholic Archdiocese, Mother of God at Moscow, with three suffragan dioceses (Saint Clement at Saratov, Saint Joseph at Irkutsk, Transfiguration at Novosibirsk) and the Apostolic Prefecture of Yuzhno-Sakhalinsk. According to the Slavic Center for Law and Justice, Protestants make up the second or third largest group of Christians in Russia, with approximately 3,500 organizations and more than 1 million followers. A large number of missionaries operating in the country are from Protestant denominations.

Christianity was the religious self-identification of 47.1% of the Russian population in 2012. Other polls give different results: In the same year 2020 the Levada Center estimated that 63% of Russians were Christians; in 2020 the Public Opinion Foundation estimated that 63% of the population was Christian; in 2011 the Pew Research Center estimated that 71% of Russians were Christians; in 2011 Ipsos MORI estimated that 69% of Russians were Christians; and in 2021 the Russian Public Opinion Research Center (VCIOM) estimated that ~67% of Russians were Christians.

The Russian "law on non-governmental organizations" that took effect in April 2007 requires non-governmental organizations (NGOs), including Evangelical churches, to register with state agencies, list their funding sources, and provide records of all meetings. Since 2016, they also face increased restrictions on public and private evangelism as a result of the Yarovaya law.

== Demographics ==
Christianity in Russia as of 2012 (Sreda Arena Atlas)
Russian Orthodoxy	86.7%
Other Orthodox	3.2%
Old Believers	0.6%
Roman Catholic	0.2%
Pentecostalism	0.2%
Protestantism	0.4%
Nondenominational Christianity	7.6%

Church of the Savior on Blood in Saint Petersburg

In accordance with some reference books, Christian Orthodoxy is professed by about 75% of Russia's believers.

In 2012, the first large-scale survey of religions in Russia was done by Sreda Arena. Results showed that 66,840,000 people in the country (47.4% of the total population) identified as Christians.

This includes:

- 41.1%—58,800,000 members of the Russian Orthodox Church;
- 4.1%—5,900,000 people identifying as Christians without belonging to any church;
- 1.5%—2,100,000 people believing in Orthodox Christianity without belonging to any Orthodox church or belonging to non-Russian churches;
- 0.3%—400,000 Old Believers;
- 0.2%—300,000 Protestants;
- 0.1%—140,000 members of the Catholic Church;
- 0.1%—140,000 Pentecostals

According to research done in 2020 by the International Religious Demography Project and published on the World Religion Database, 82.19% of Russians identify as Christians.

This group is divided into the following:

- 0.19% unaffiliated Christians
- 79.28% Orthodox
- 0.48% Catholics
- 1.03% Protestants
- 1.31% Independents

Regarding the total number of Christians in Russia by 2020, the Pew Research Center counted 102,4 million people (69,9% of the population), while over the previous decade their number decreased by 8,6 mln, mainly due to the growth of the non-religious population.

In 2025, the Russian Public Opinion Research Center (VCIOM) found that 67% of Russians identified as Orthodox Christians, 1% as Protestants and less than 1% as Catholics.

According to the All-Russian Public Opinion Research Center, the number of young Russians identifying as Orthodox Christians nearly doubled between 2021 and 2025, from 25% in 2021 to 45% in 2025.

== Eastern Orthodoxy ==
=== Russian Orthodox Church ===
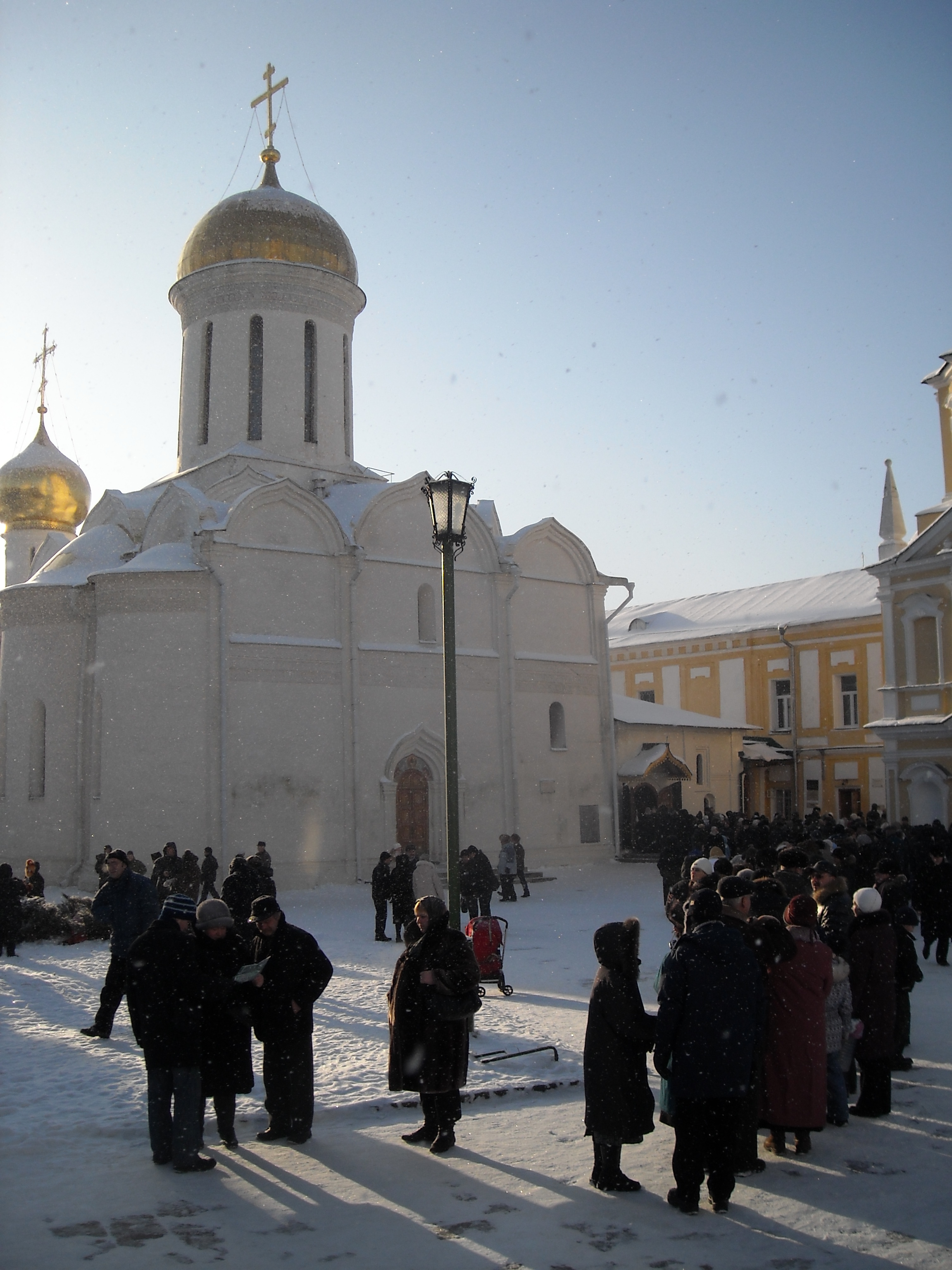
Holy Trinity Cathedral in Sergiev Posad

In terms of their ethnicity, Orthodox are not only the majority of believers of the Russians and many other indigenous peoples of Russia (Karelians, Mari, Mordvins, Komi, Chuvash, Ossetians, Khakassians, Yakuts and others), but also large diasporas of Belarusians, Georgians, Moldovans and Ukrainians in Russia. Among some non-Orthodox Russian peoples there are ethnoreligious groups professing Orthodoxy, such as: Kryashens among the Tatars, Mozdok Kabardins and Western Buryats.

The Russian Orthodox Church is organized in a hierarchical structure. Each church and its attendees constitute a parish (prikhod). All parishes in a geographical region belong to an eparchy (eparkhiya—equivalent to a Western diocese). Eparchies are governed by bishops (episkope or archierey). There are around 130 Russian Orthodox eparchies worldwide. As of February 2, 2010, the Russian Orthodox Church (Moscow Patriarchate) has 160 dioceses including 30,142 parishes served by 207 bishops, 28,434 priests and 3,625 deacons. There are 788 monasteries, including 386 for men and 402 for women.

Some eparchies are organized into exarchates, or autonomous churches. These include the Belarusian, Latvian, Moldovan and Estonian Orthodox churches. The Chinese and Japanese Orthodox Churches were granted full autonomy by the Moscow Patriarchate, but this autonomy is not universally recognized. Smaller eparchies are usually governed by a single bishop. Larger eparchies, exarchates, and autonomous churches are governed by Metropolitan archbishops and sometimes have one or more bishops assigned to them. The highest level of authority in the Church is represented by the Patriarch of Moscow and All Russia, head of the Holy Synod of the Russian Orthodox Church. The Holy Synod is the governing body of the Church between the Bishops' Councils.

According to Saint Tikhon's Orthodox University and other researchers, up to several hundred thousands of Orthodox believers were repressed for their faith in the Soviet period.

=== Old Believers ===
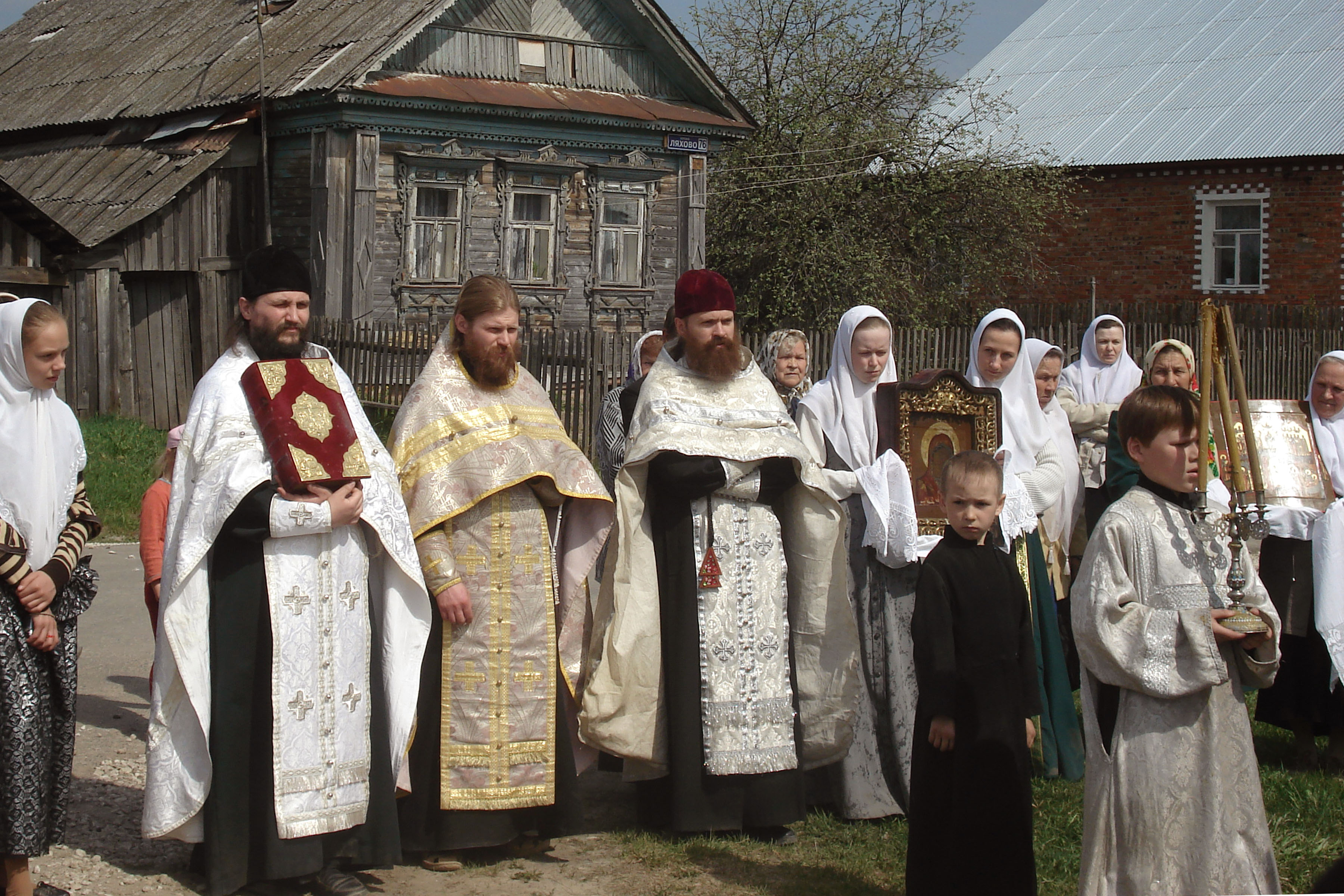
The communal Old Believers' service for the Bright Easter Week, Moscow Oblast

Old Believers or Old Orthodox are Russian Orthodox Christians who maintain the liturgical and ritual practices of the Eastern Orthodox Church as they were before the reforms of Patriarch Nikon of Moscow. They split from the mainstream Russian Orthodox Church in the 17th century.

In 1971, the Moscow Patriarchate revoked the anathemas placed on the Old Believers in the 17th century, but most Old Believer communities have not returned to Communion with other Orthodox Christians.

As of 2006, the total number of Old Believers is estimated from 500,000 to 1 million, some living in isolated communities to which they fled centuries ago to avoid persecution. An Old Believer parish in the United States has entered into communion with the Russian Orthodox Church Outside Russia. Old-Believer churches in Russia have begun the restoration of their property, although Old Believers face many difficulties in claiming restitution rights for their churches. Moscow has churches for the most important Old Believer branches: Rogozhskaya Zastava (Popovtsy of the Belokrinitskaya hierarchy official center), a cathedral for the Novozybkovskaya hierarchy in Zamoskvorech'ye and Preobrazhenskaya Zastava where Pomortsy and Fedoseevtsy coexist.

Nowadays, Old Believers have four registered all-Russia denominational church bodies, namely the Russian Orthodox Old-Rite Church, the Russian Old-Orthodox Church, the Pomorian Old-Orthodox Church, and the Old-Pomorian Old-Orthodox Church of Fedoseyan Confession.

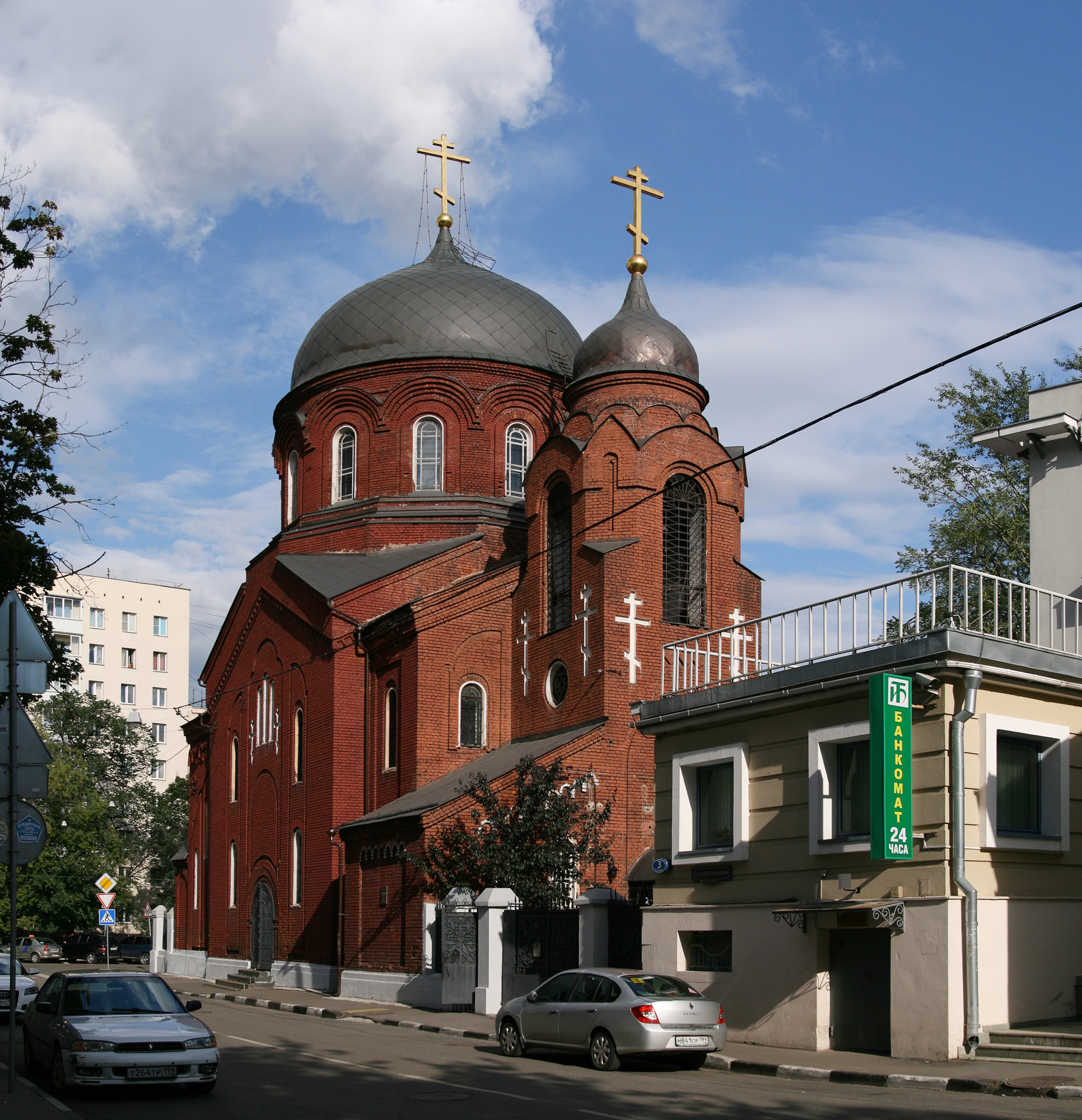
The Church of the Intercession cathedral of the Russian Old-Orthodox Church in Moscow

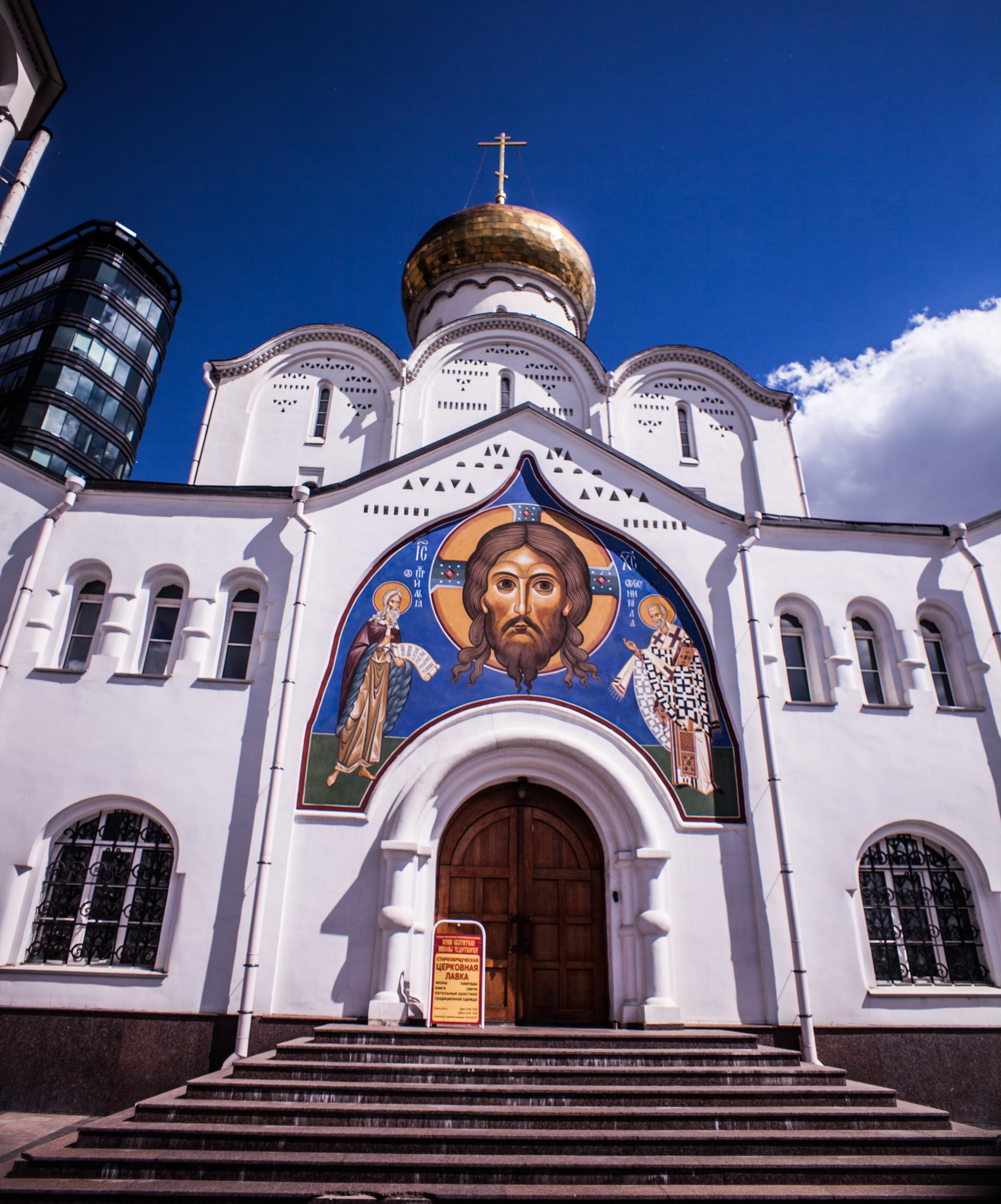
Church of Saint Nicholas on Tverskaya Square, Moscow

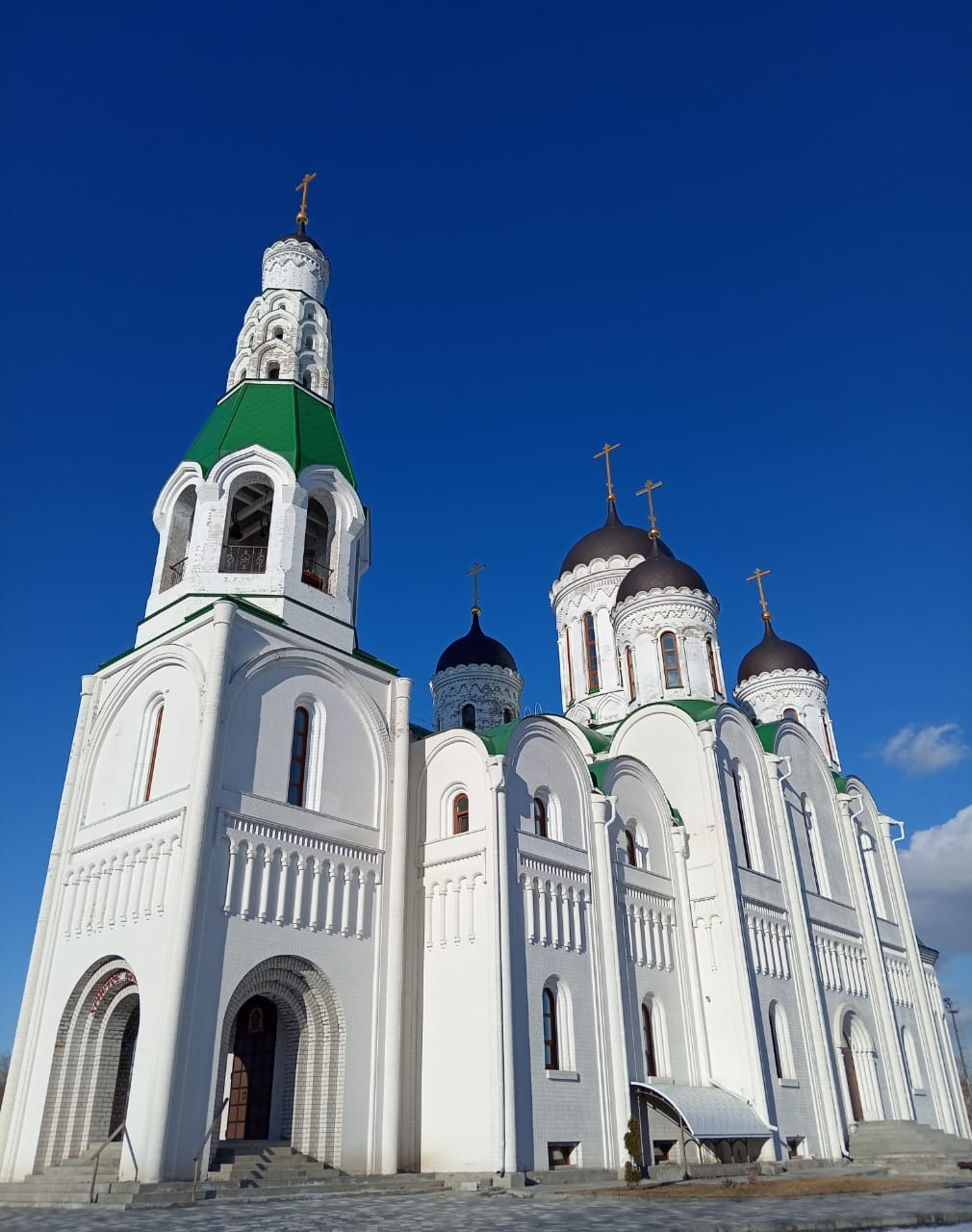
Church of the Intercession in Barnaul

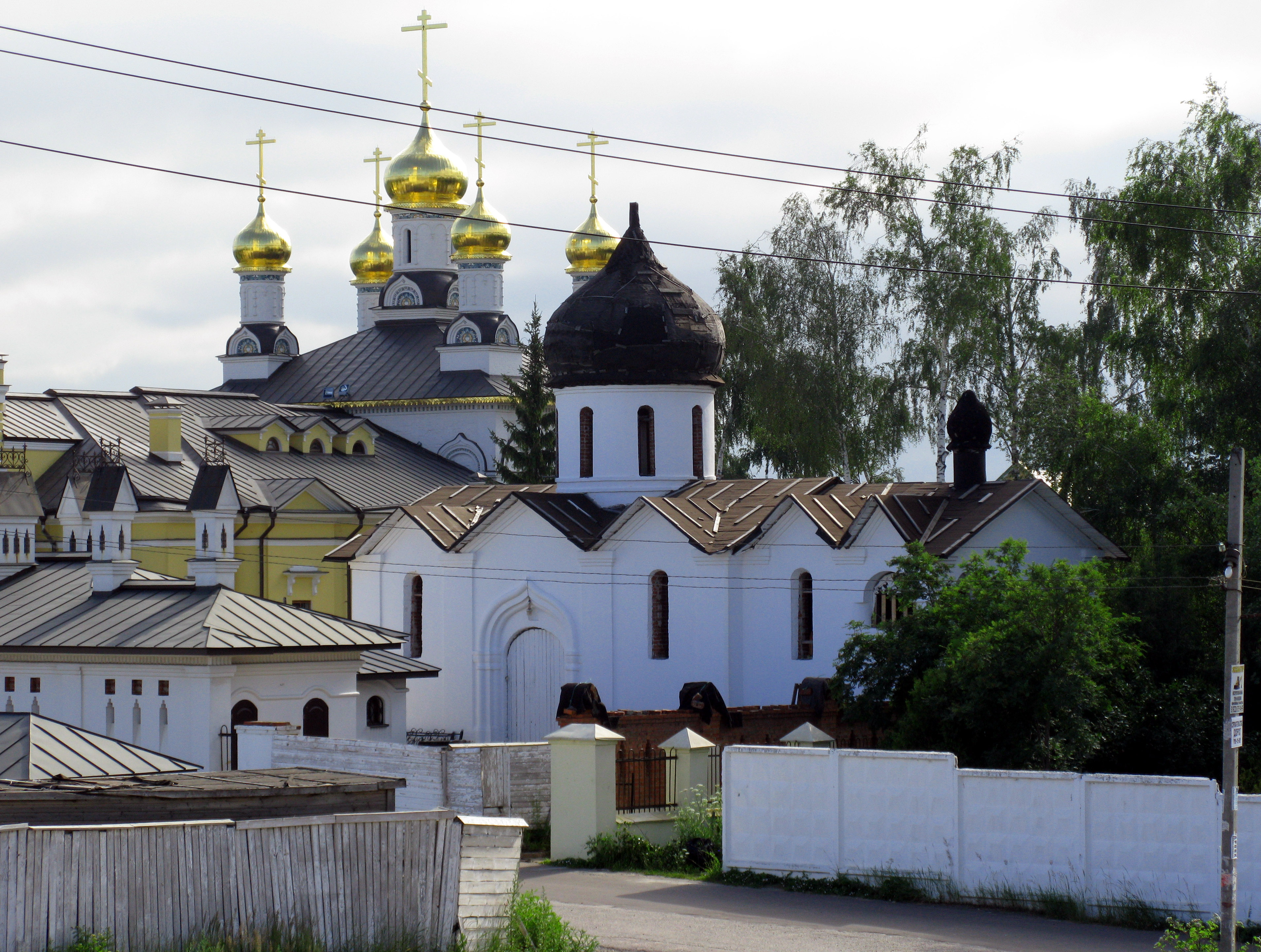
Church of the Archangel Michael in Mikhailovskaya Sloboda

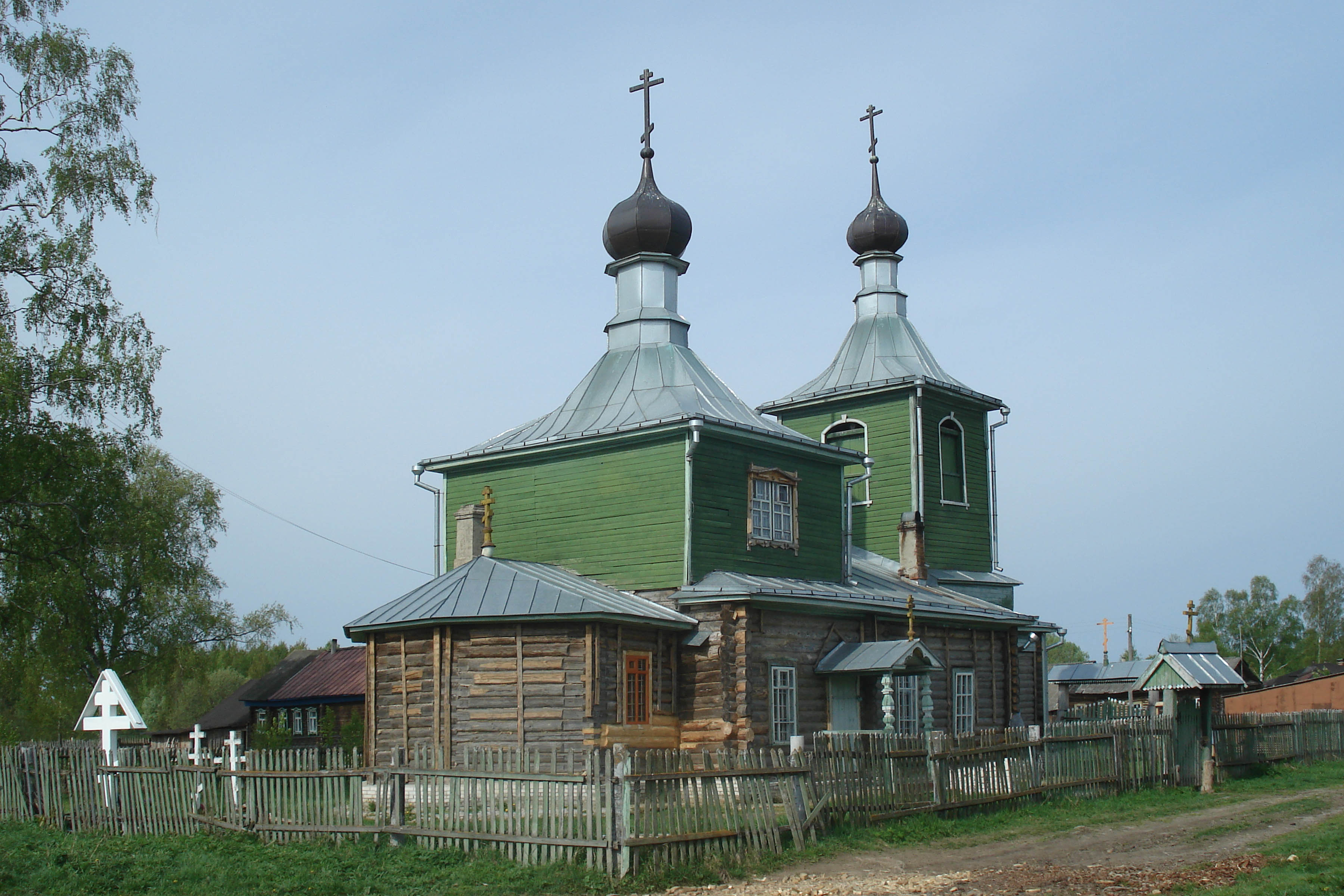
Church of the Dormition of the Theotokos in Rytovo

=== True Orthodoxy ===
True Orthodoxy is groupping of traditionalist Orthodox churches which since the 1920s have severed communion with the mainstream Eastern Orthodox churches, including the Russian, for various reasons, such as the involvement in ecumenism or the collaboration with Communist authorities.

Among True Orthodox bodies, there are the Russian Orthodox Autonomous Church, the Russian True Orthodox Church, the True Russian Orthodox Church, and others.

== Oriental Orthodoxy ==
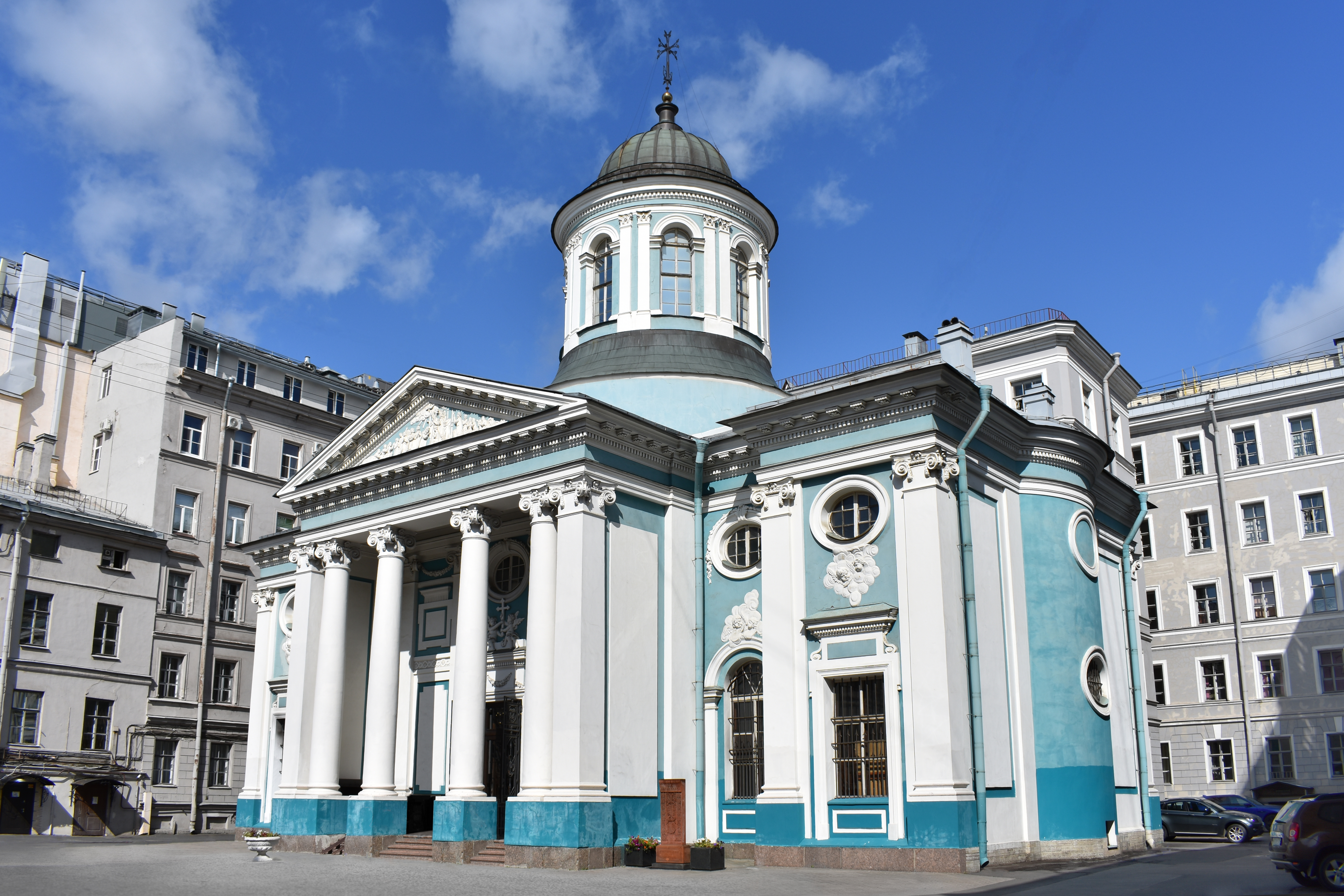
Saint Catherine's Armenian Church in Saint Petersburg

Long historical ties with Armenia have resulted in a significant presence of Armenians in Russia. Most of ethnic Armenians in Russia are adherents of the Armenian Apostolic Church, one of the main churches of the Oriental Orthodoxy, distinctive from Eastern Orthodoxy in terms of miaphysite christology. In spite of some theological differences, relations between Armenian Apostolic Church and the Russian Orthodox Church are very good. There are Armenian eparchies (dioceses), and many churches on the territory of Russia (see: List of Armenian churches in Russia).

== Assyrian Church of the East ==
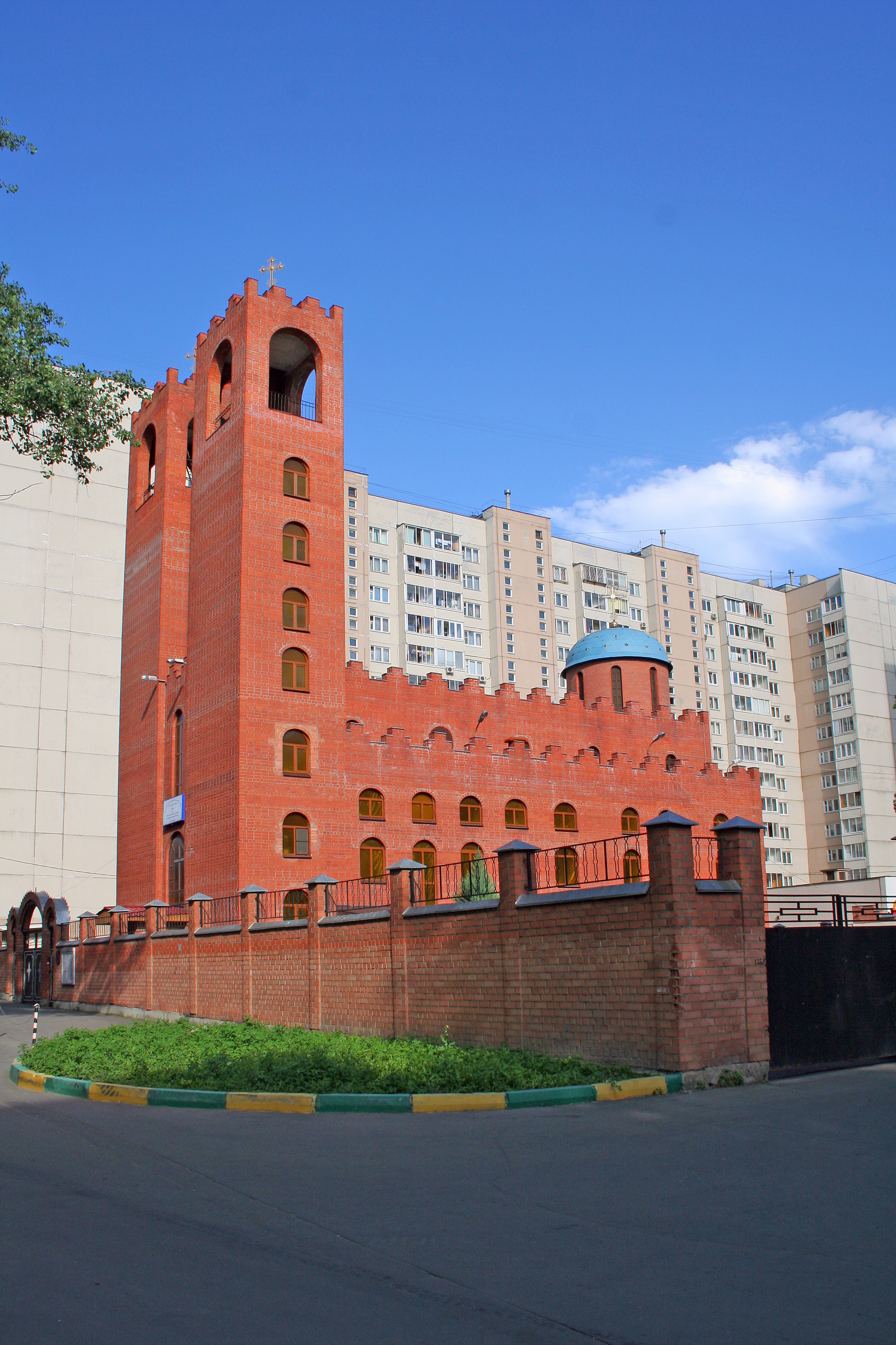
St. Mary Assyrian Church in Moscow

Assyrians in Russia have long lived in the south of the country, as well as in Moscow. Most of them remain faithful to the Assyrian Church of the East and are subordinate to the Bishop of Baghdad, Russia and Georgia. In 1998, the Mat Maryam temple was built in Moscow.

== Catholicism ==
=== Roman Catholicism ===
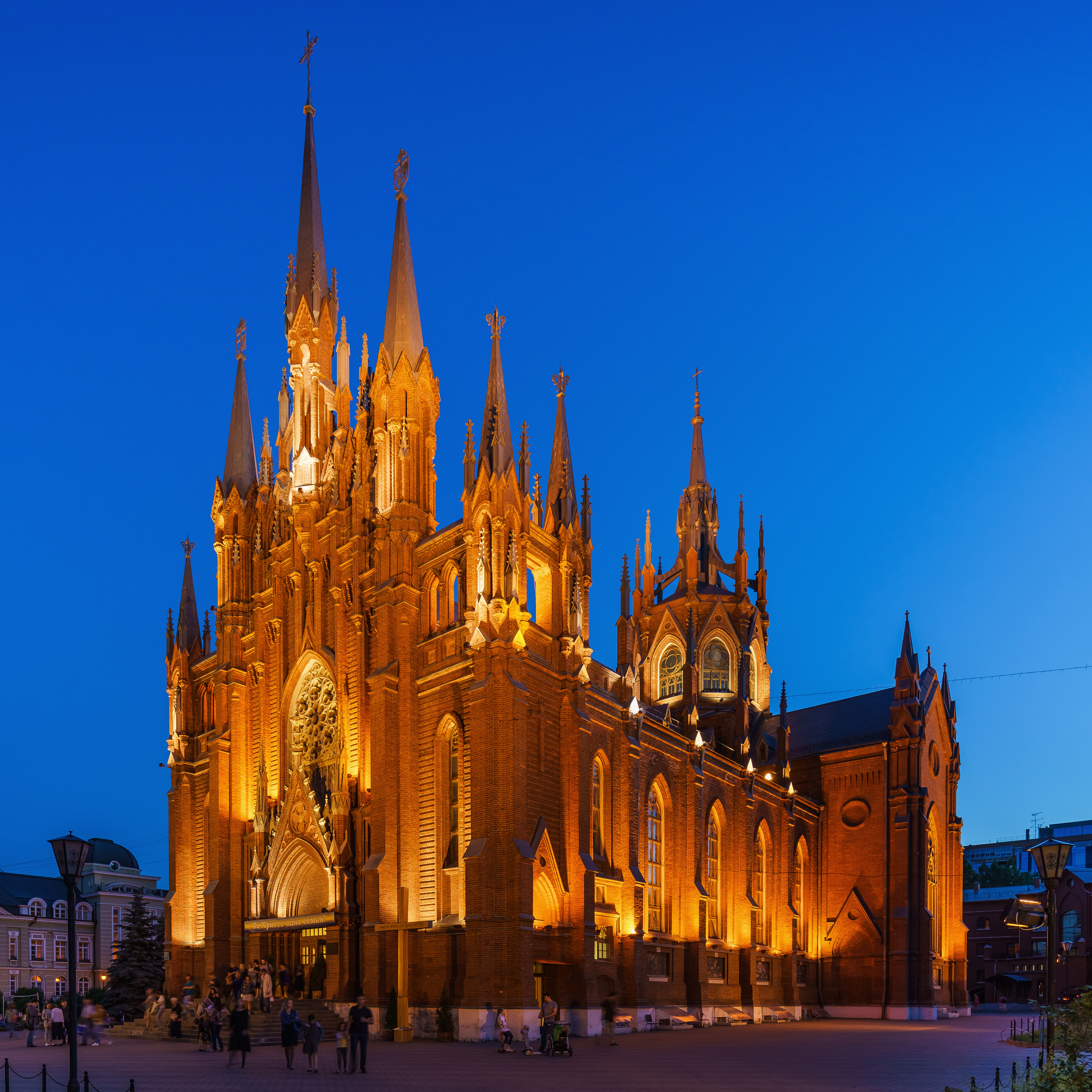
Cathedral of the Immaculate Conception in Moscow

As of 2008, the Catholic Church in Russia had one Archdiocese of Mother of God at Moscow (headed by Archbishop Pavel Pezzi), three dioceses (Saint Clement at Saratov, Saint Joseph at Irkutsk, Transfiguration at Novosibirsk), one Apostolic Exarchate and one Apostolic Prefecture in Yuzhno Sakhalinsk. The Catholic Archbishop of Moscow has voiced his support for religious education in state sponsored schools, citing the examples of other countries.

Relations with the Russian Orthodox church have been difficult for nearly a millennium, and attempts at re-establishing Catholicism have met with opposition. Pope John Paul II expressed a desire to visit Russia, but the Russian Orthodox Church resisted. In April 2002, Bishop Jerry Mazur of Eastern Siberia was stripped of his visa, forcing the appointment of a new bishop for that diocese. In 2002, five foreign Catholic priests were denied visas to return to Russia, construction of a new cathedral was blocked in Pskov, and a church in southern Russia was shot at. On December 25, 2005, Russian Orthodox activists planned to picket outside of Moscow's Catholic Cathedral, but the picket was cancelled. Despite easing of relations with the election of Pope Benedict XVI, there remain issues such as the readiness of the police to protect Catholics and other minorities from persecution.

One thousand Russian Catholics gathered in the Virgin Mary's Immaculate Conception Cathedral in Moscow to watch the funeral of Pope John Paul II in 2005. He had previously given an 18th-century copy of the famous Our Lady of Kazan icon to the Russian Orthodox Church.

=== Eastern Catholicism ===
There are also Byzantine Rite Catholic Church communes in Russia (in Moscow, St. Petersburg, Omsk and Nizhnevartovsk), which are in full communion with, and subject to, the authority of the Pope as defined by Eastern canon law. That tradition is closely connected with the ideas of philosopher and poet Vladimir Sergeyevich Solovyov. In Kaliningrad, there is a parish of the Belarusian Greek Catholic Church.

== Protestantism ==
Ethnicity of Protestants in Russia
1. German background (20.0%)
2. English speaking backgrounds (20.0%)
3. Korean (19.0%)
4. Ukrainian (18.0%)
5. Russian (16.0%)
6. Other (7.00%)

The Kirche Pörschken in New Moscow Village, Bagrationovsky District, Kaliningrad region, a former German Catholic and Lutheran church dating back to 1261—the oldest church in the country and a regional cultural heritage monument—the building is abandoned and falling into ruin.

Baptists, Adventists, Evangelical Christians (particular denomination), Lutherans, Pentecostals, Charismatic and Neo-charismatic movements, Calvinists, Methodists and Holiness movement, Quakers, Messianics and some other Protestant denominations are present in Russia, and some observers believe Russia will experience a Protestant revival in the future. There is particular growth among the Korean and German minorities. Baptists have been historically the largest Protestant group in Russia.

Some Protestants, especially at the provincial level, report government restrictions and obstruction of their activities by local authorities. In April 2007, the European Court of Human Rights obliged Russia to pay €10,000 as non-pecuniary damages for the refusal to register the Moscow branch of the Salvation Army. One Baptist missionary and the minister said, "every religion outside Russian Orthodoxy is considered a cult, including Protestantism."

According to Evangelical Christians Baptists who conducted a bicycle missionary expedition in July – August 2007, they faced serious obstacles and suspicious attitude from local authorities in several regions of Russia. Their services were banned several times in public parks. According to Yuri Sipko, president of the Union of Evangelical Christians-Baptists of Russia, the goal of the tour was to, "fight their way through on foot or on bicycles to reach even the most remote village and the most despairing person in order to convert them." These words are what caused most hostility towards Protestants.

The Russian "law on non-governmental organizations" that took effect in April 2007 requires non-governmental organizations (NGOs), including Evangelical churches, to register with state agencies, list their funding sources, and provide records of all meetings. In June 2016, Russia passed an anti-terrorism law that bans proselytizing and missionary activities. On July 8, 2016, the U.S. Commission on International Religious Freedom (USCIRF) strongly condemned these measures stating, "Under the guise of confronting terrorism, they would grant authorities sweeping powers to curtail civil liberties, including setting broad restrictions on religious practices that would make it very difficult for religious groups to operate." An article in The Christian Post, discussing the ban on proselytizing stated, "Human rights and religious freedom advocates argue that the law 'doesn't do that much to defend from terrorism and only prevents Christians and others who are not Orthodox from preaching and proselytizing.'" In 2017, the USCIRF reclassified Russia as one of the world's worst violators of religious liberty, recommending that the US government deem Russia a "country of particular concern" under the International Religious Freedom Act. Since 2016, Russian Christians face increased restrictions on public and private evangelism as a result of the Yarovaya law.

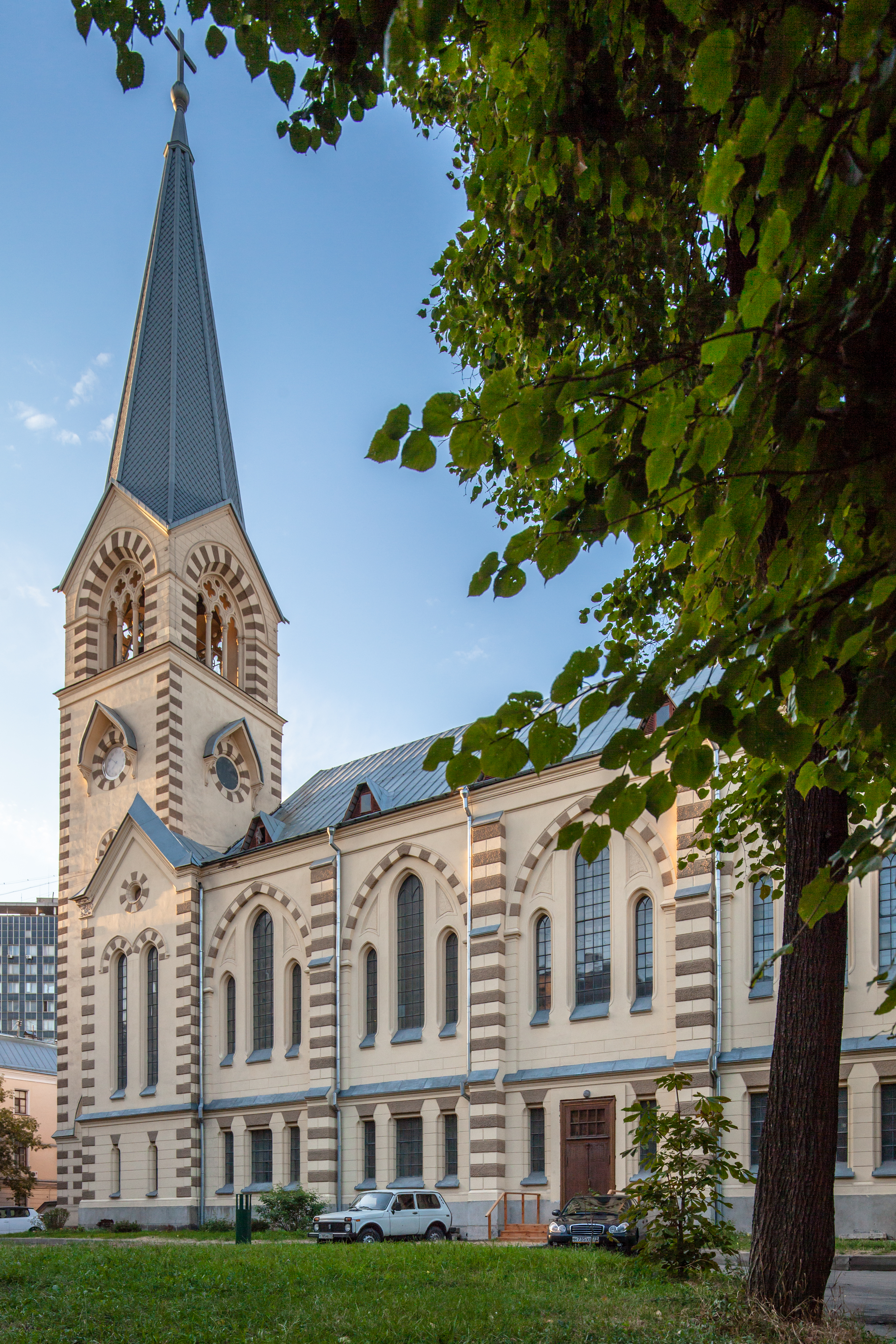
Saints Peter and Paul Lutheran Cathedral in Moscow

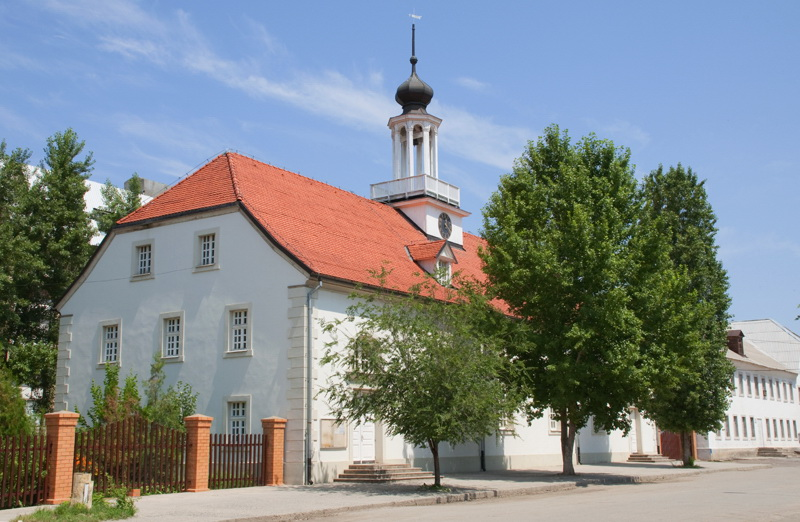
One of the oldest active Protestant church in Russia, Lutheran, previously Moravian, Kirche in Sarepta, Old Sarepta, Volgograd, 1772

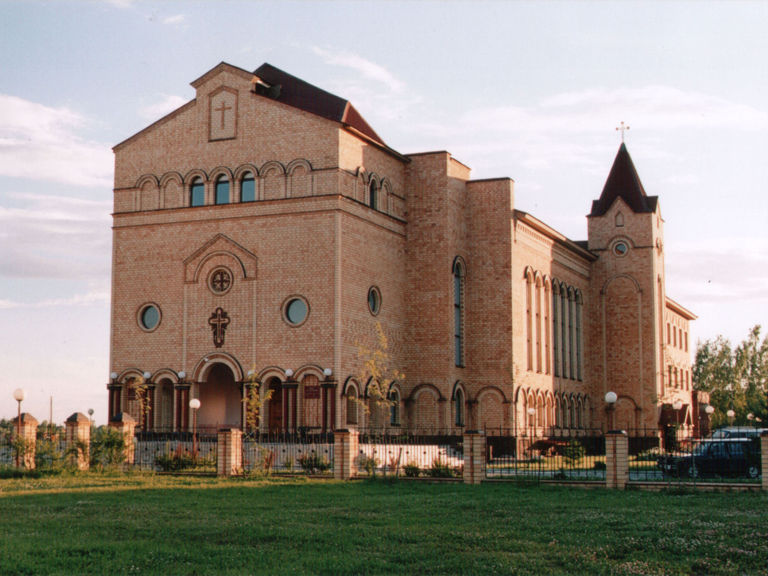
Baptist "The Christ Church" in Veliky Novgorod

== Restorationism ==
Certain Christian denominations consider themselves to have restored primitive Christianity and do not consider themselves part of Protestantism. Some Orthodox scholars view these denominations as 'totalitarian sects'. The largest of these denominations are Jehovah's Witnesses and Latter-day Saints. The Christadelphians, the Disciples of Christ, and the Irvingites (New Apistolics) are represented to a lesser extent.

=== Jehovah's Witnesses ===
Zion's Watch Tower (now called The Watchtower, the primary journal of the Watch Tower Society) had subscribers in Russia as early as 1887. In 1935, the Watch Tower Society unsuccessfully attempted to establish a branch office in the Soviet Union to support members already there. By 1939, thousands of Jehovah's Witnesses were residing in the Baltic states when the Soviet Union absorbed those formerly independent countries. In the 1940s, the Soviet government forcibly dispersed thousands of Witnesses, in a program named Operation North, later described by Dr. N. S. Gordienko, a professor at Herzen University as having "just the opposite of what was expected; they wanted to weaken the organization of Jehovah's Witnesses in the USSR, but in fact, they only strengthened it". In the 1950s and 1960s, Jehovah's Witnesses were tracked, infiltrated, harassed, and persecuted by the Soviet government. By 1971, there were more than 4,500 Witnesses in the Soviet Union. When the denomination was formally recognized in March 1991, the organization reported 15,987 members in Russia. Beginning in 1993, Witness missionaries from Germany were assigned to Russia to support the local members. By 2014, Jehovah's Witnesses reported over 170,000 members in Russia.

On March 23, 2017, the Russian News Agency TASS reported that Russia's Justice Ministry had suspended the activities of the Administrative Center of Jehovah's Witnesses in Russia due to extremist activities. On April 4, 2017 UN Special Rapporteur on Freedom of Opinion and Expression David Kaye, UN Special Rapporteur on Freedoms of Peaceful Assembly and Association Maina Kiai, and UN Special Rapporteur on Freedom of Religion and Belief Ahmed Shaheed condemned Russia's desire to ban Jehovah's Witnesses. However, on April 20, 2017, the Supreme Court of Russia issued a verdict upholding the claim from the country's Justice Ministry that Jehovah's Witnesses' activity violated laws on "extremism". The ruling liquidates the group's Russian headquarters in St. Petersburg and all of its 395 local religious organizations, ordering their property to be seized by the state. According to Forum 18, this is the first time that a court has ruled that a registered national centralized religious organization is "extremist" and banned. Various countries and international organizations have spoken out against Russia's religious abuses of Jehovah's Witnesses. An article in Newsweek stated, "Russia's decision to ban Jehovah's Witnesses in the country shows the 'paranoia' of Vladimir Putin's government, according to the chair of the United States Commission on International Religious Freedom (USCIRF)." The United States Holocaust Memorial Museum also expressed deep concern over Russia's treatment of Jehovah's Witnesses. This oppression continued and expanded through 2024.

=== Latter-day Saints ===
The Church of Jesus Christ of Latter-day Saints had primitive beginnings in the Russian Empire. Joseph Smith called George J. Adams and Orson Hyde as missionaries to Russia in 1843, 13 years after the Church's creation. However, the death of Smith occurred, and Adams and Hyde never traveled to Russia. The first Russian converts were baptized in the nation in 1895. They were then imprisoned after the October Revolution in 1918. The Church had some contact with the Soviet Union, such as Ezra Taft Benson visiting Moscow in 1959 and Yuri Dubinin visiting Utah and the Brigham Young University campus in April 1990. The Book of Mormon was translated into Russian and published in 1981. In 1987, a Finland Mission president had been blessed to begin work in the Baltic states and Russia, that is, during the late Soviet era. They resumed missionary work in Estonia in 1989, and in 1990, from Estonia it went to Russia; thus, the Church was able to reestablish its presence in Russia in 1990, and the Russian government officially recognized the Church in May 1991. Membership grew in the 1990s and early 2000s, and by 2009, the Church reported membership of 19,946 in 129 congregations in Russia. According to the Church's website, no membership statistics are currently available. The Church's proselyting efforts were impacted by the 2019 Yarovaya law; missionaries are now referred to as "volunteers" and cannot speak openly about the Church outside of official Church sites. In 2018, Russell M. Nelson announced at the April General Conference of the Church that a temple would be constructed in a major city in Russia.

=== Irvingites ===
In the 19th century, the restorationist Catholic Apostolic Church (Irvingites) propagated their teachings within the Russian Empire, establishing organized church congregations in St. Petersburg, Riga, and Reval. Representatives appeared in St. Petersburg in the late 1860s; General von Eberg served as a missionary there. The movement had between 100 and 200 adherents. The church gained legal recognition in 1905. Services were conducted in German. The congregation was dissolved in the spring of 1933.

Today, the New Apostolic Church—a branch of the Irvingian movement—has a significant following in Russia.

== Spiritual Christianity ==
Spiritual Christianity is the group of Russian movements, so-called folk Protestants. Their origins are varied: some were influenced by western Protestants, others from disgust of the behavior of official Orthodox priests. The Spiritual Christian movements are Khlysts (virtually extinct), Skoptsy (virtually extinct), Doukhobors, Molokans, and Spiritual Christian Teetotalers–Churikovites. The Tolstoyan movement was close to the Spiritual Christians.

Yehowists, a.k.a. the Message of Zion, is a Russian millenarian movement, closed both to Spiritual Christianity and Judaism, founded in the 1840s.

Former Molokan Prayer House in Rasskazovo

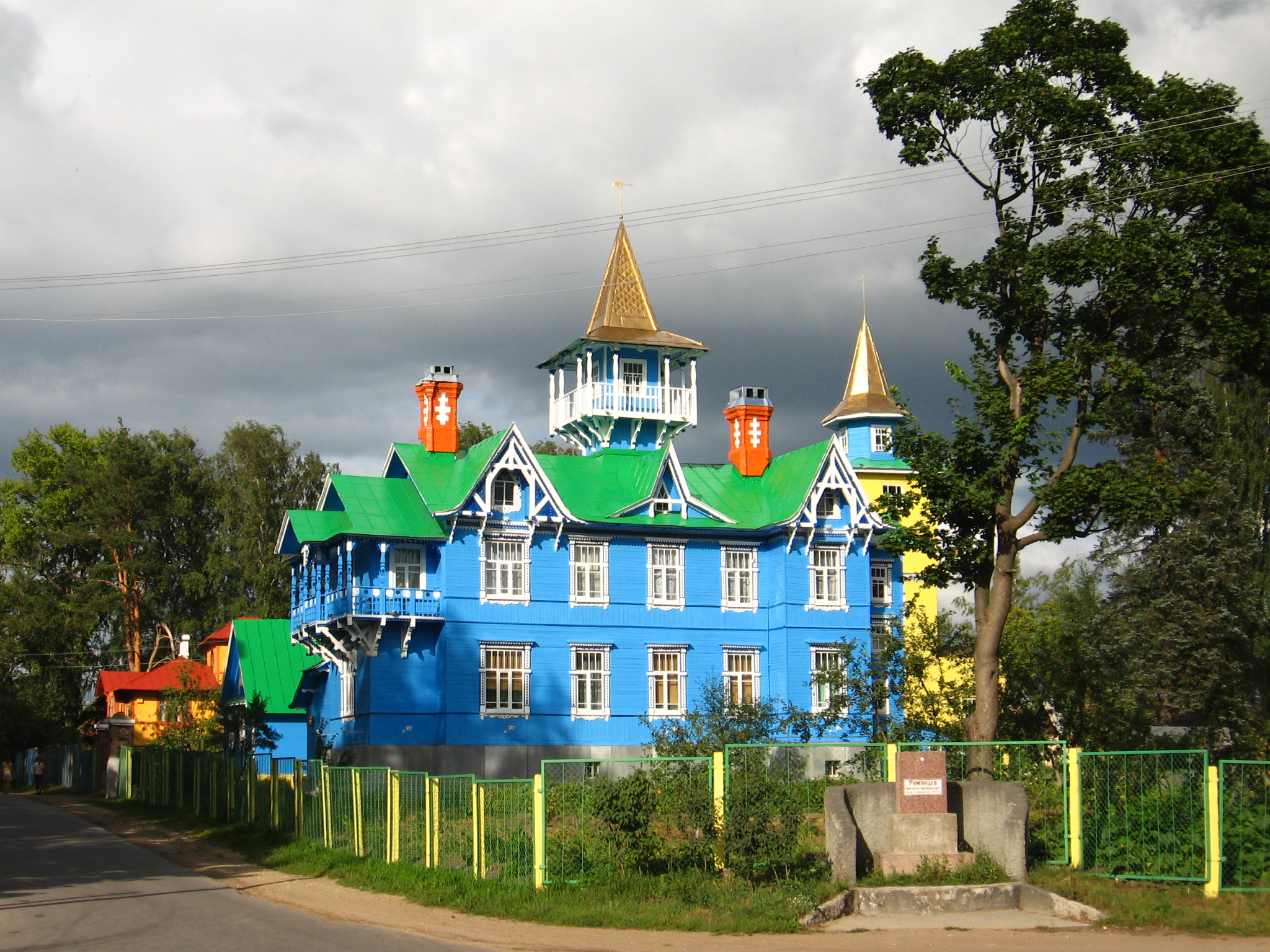
Prayer House of Spiritual Christian Teetotalers in Vyritsa

== Bible translation ==
Translation of the Bible into Russian began in the 16th and 17th centuries. However, the works (by deacon of Posolsky Prikaz Avraamiy Firsov, pastor E. Gluk, and archbishop Methodiy (Smirnov)) were lost during political turbulence and wars.

=== Russian Bible Society ===
Full-scale translation of the Bible into Russian began in 1813, with the establishment of the Russian Bible Society. The complete Bible comprising the Old Testament and New Testament was published in 1876. This work, called the Russian Synodal Bible, is widely used by Protestant communities in Russia and former Soviet countries. From 1813 until 1826, the Russian Bible Society distributed more than 500,000 Bible-related books in 41 languages. During the 19th and 20th centuries, activities of the Society were stopped by reactionary policies of the Russian government, but were restored in 1990–1991 when Soviet regime restrictions eased.

The opening ceremony of the Russian Bible Society in Moscow was visited by representatives of Orthodox, Catholic and Protestant churches, who combined their Bible translation and distribution efforts. The Russian Bible Society produces over 1,000,000 Bible-related books per year. The Society also translates the Bible into the languages and dialects of various ethnic groups throughout Russia.

=== Makarios Bible ===
Mikhail Iakovlevich Glukharev, known as Archimandrite Makarios, was a Russian Orthodox missionary who translated most of the Old Testament between 1839 and 1847, while a contemporary associate named Gerasim Petrovich Pavsky translated Psalms. Makarios was unable to publish his translation, but a journal called Orthodox Review acquired and published the Makarios Bible in installments between 1860 and 1867, under the title An Experiment of Translation Into the Russian Language. The magazines were rediscovered in 1993 in the rare-books section of the Russian National Library, which gave permission for the works to be published. In January 1997, the Watch Tower Society arranged for publication and distribution of the translation throughout Russia.

=== New World Translation ===
In 2002, the Watch Tower Society released the Holy Bible (with New World Translation of the Christian Greek Scriptures) in Russian. The complete New World Translation of the Holy Scriptures in Russian was released in 2007.

== See also ==
- Russian Orthodox Church
- Catholic Church in Russia
- Protestants in Russia
- Russian Synodal Bible
- Ushkovayzet
