= Borisoglebsky (inhabited locality) =

Borisoglebsky (Russian: Борисогле́бский; masculine), Borisoglebskaya (Борисогле́бская; feminine), or Borisoglebskoye (Борисогле́бское; neuter) is the name of several inhabited localities in Russia.

== Modern localities ==
Urban localities

- Borisoglebsky, Yaroslavl Oblast, a work settlement in Borisoglebsky District of Yaroslavl Oblast

Rural localities

- Borisoglebsky, Murmansk Oblast, an inhabited locality in Pechengsky District of Murmansk Oblast
- Borisoglebskoye, Kemerovo Oblast (or Borisoglebsky), a selo in Novovostochnaya Rural Territory of Tyazhinsky District in Kemerovo Oblast; 56°12′N 88°39′E
- Borisoglebskoye, Kostroma Oblast, a selo in Zavrazhnoye Settlement of Kadyysky District in Kostroma Oblast; 57°24′N 43°2′E
- Borisoglebskoye, Oryol Oblast, a selo in Krasnoarmeysky Selsoviet of Sverdlovsky District in Oryol Oblast
- Borisoglebskoye, Vologda Oblast, a village in Vysokovsky Selsoviet of Vologodsky District in Vologda Oblast

== Abolished localities ==
- Borisoglebskaya, a village in Lapshinsky Selsoviet of Vokhomsky District of Kostroma Oblast; abolished on October 6, 2004
