= Prebendary =

Member of clergy

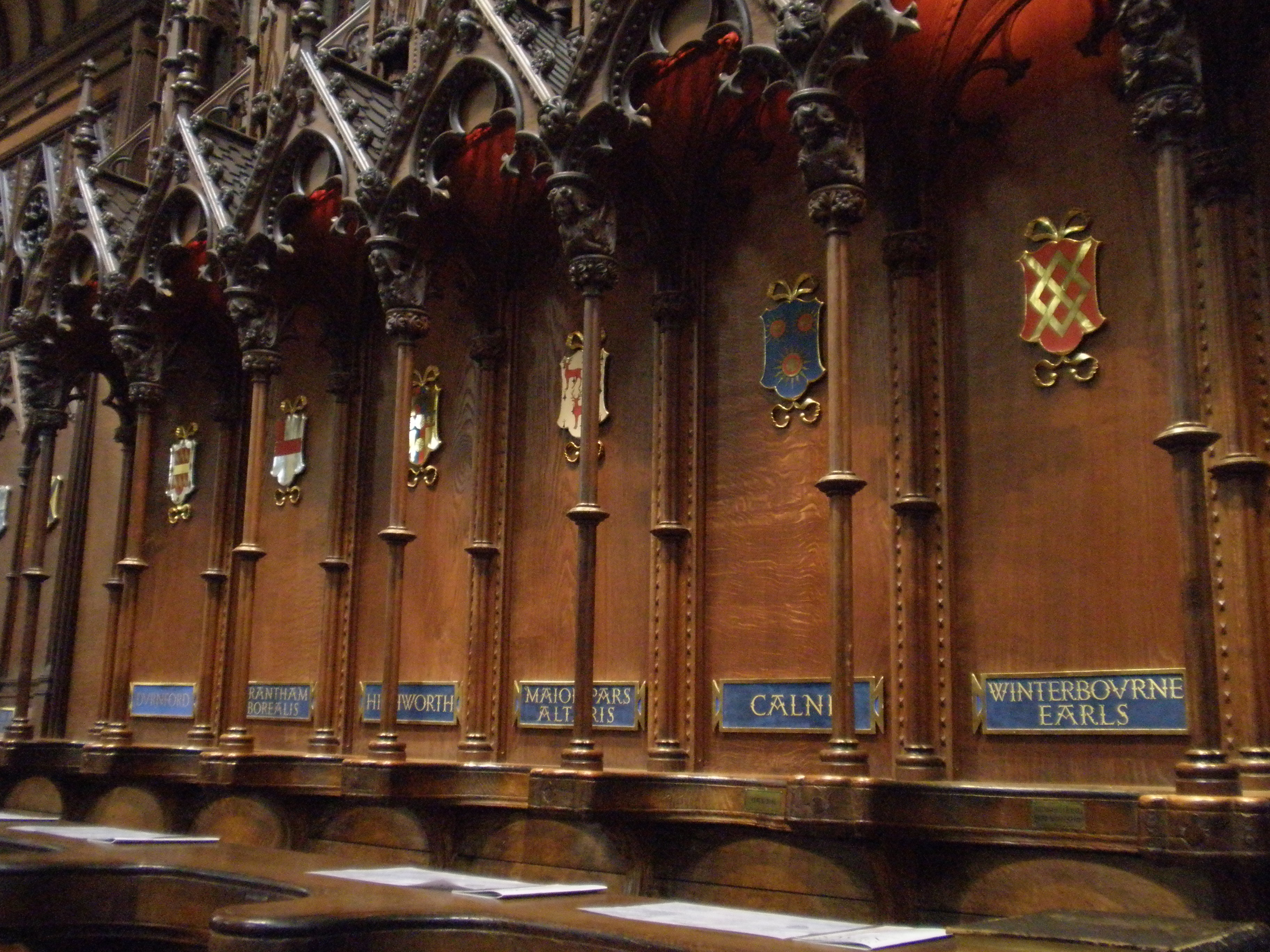
Prebendal stalls in the Choir of Salisbury Cathedral in England

A prebendary is a member of the Catholic or Anglican clergy, a form of canon with a role in the administration of a cathedral or collegiate church. When attending services, prebendaries sit in particular seats, usually at the back of the choir stalls, known as prebendal stalls.

== History ==
At the time of the Domesday Book in 1086, the canons and dignitaries of the cathedrals of England were supported by the produce and other profits from the cathedral estates. In the early 12th century, the endowed prebend was developed as an institution, in possession of which a cathedral official had a fixed and independent income. This made the cathedral canons independent of the bishop, and created posts that attracted the younger sons of the nobility. Part of the endowment was retained in a common fund, known in Latin as communia, which was used to provide bread and money to a canon in residence in addition to the income from his prebend.

Most prebends disappeared in 1547, when nearly all collegiate churches in England and Wales were dissolved by the Dissolution of Colleges Act 1547 (1 Edw. 6. c. 14), as part of the Reformation. The church of St Endellion, Cornwall, is one of the few still extant.

The office of prebendary is retained by certain Church of England dioceses (those of Lichfield, Lincoln, and London being significant examples) as an honorary title for senior parish priests, usually awarded in recognition of long and dedicated service to the diocese. These priests are entitled to be called "Prebendary" (usually shortened to Preb.) and have a role in the administration of the relevant cathedral. Prebendaries have a prebendal stall in certain cathedrals and collegiate churches.

The greater chapter of a cathedral includes both the residentiary canons (full-time senior cathedral clergy) and the prebendaries (and, in London, the Minor Canons). In the Church of England, when a diocesan bishop retires, moves to another diocese or dies, the monarch will summon the greater chapter to elect a successor. This election is ceremonial, as the monarch (following the advice of the prime minister) tells the members of the greater chapter whom they are to elect.

Wells Cathedral and Saint Patrick's Cathedral, Dublin still call their canons "prebendaries". They form the chapter of the cathedral and sit in their prebendal stalls when in residence in the cathedral.

== Prebend ==
The prebend is the form of benefice held by a prebendary; historically, the stipend attached to it was usually drawn from specific sources in the income of a cathedral's estates. In the 21st century, many remaining prebendaries hold an honorary position which does not carry an income with it.
