= Borisoglebsky =

Borisoglebsky (masculine), Borisoglebskaya (feminine), or Borisoglebskoye (neuter) may refer to:

- Borisoglebsky District, name of several districts in Russia
- Borisoglebsky Urban Okrug, the administrative division and the municipal formation which the town of Borisoglebsk, Voronezh Oblast, Russia, is incorporated as
- Borisoglebsky (inhabited locality) (Borisoglebskaya, Borisoglebskoye), name of several inhabited localities in Russia
- Borisoglebskoye airfield, an airfield in the Republic of Tatarstan, Russia
