= Church of St. Nicholas in Tropino =

Church in Yaroslavl, Russia

Coordinates: 57.613101°N 39.891561°E

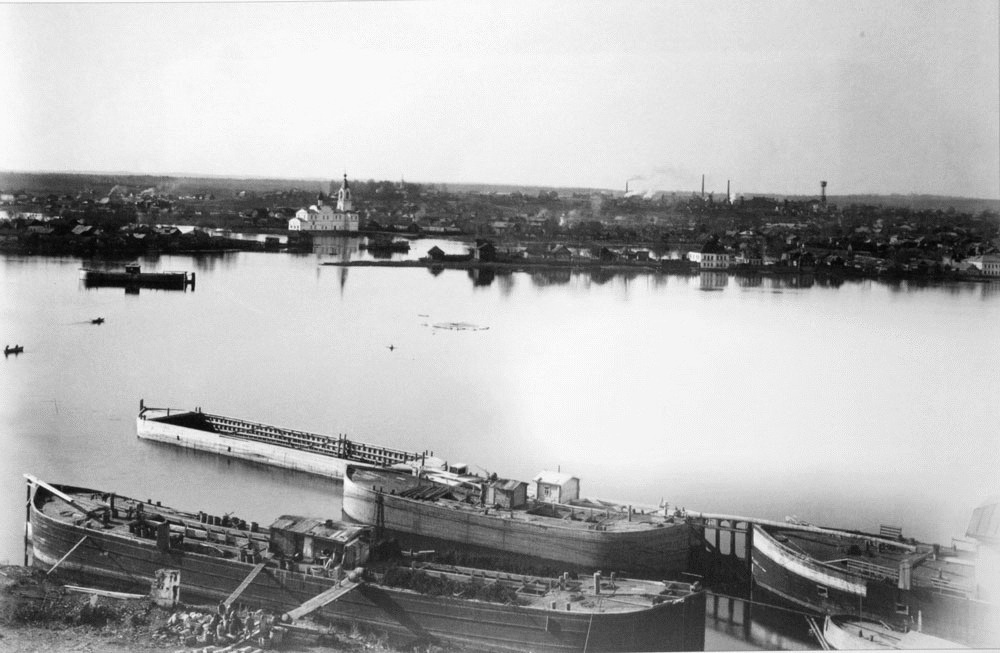
The church during a flood, 1920

The Church of St. Nicholas in Tropino (Николо-Тропинская церковь) is a ruined 17th-century church on the right bank of the Kotorosl River in Yaroslavl. It has been expanded and renovated on several occasions in the 18th and 19th centuries. The site used to be prone to seasonal flooding. A memorial cross near the church marked the spot where Patriarch Nikon died in August 1681. What remains of the old building is currently used for storing fish.

At the beginning of 2024, a plot with the building of the former Nikolo-Tropinsky Church was put up for sale in Yaroslavl.
