= Patriarch Nikon of Moscow =

Seventh Patriarch of Moscow (1605–1681)

Nikon
- Patriarch of Moscow and all Rus'
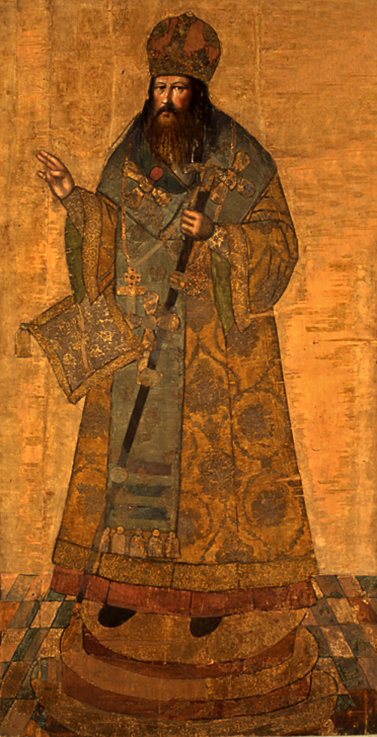
- Patriarch Nikon in painting, c. 1680s
- Church: Russian Orthodox Church
- See: Moscow
- Installed: 1652
- Term ended: 1666
- Predecessor: Patriarch Joseph of Moscow
- Successor: Patriarch Joasaphus II of Moscow

Orders
- Consecration: 1652 by Patriarch Joseph of Moscow & Macarius III Ibn al-Za’im

Personal details
- Born: Никита Минин; 7 May 1605 Veldemanovo near Nizhny Novgorod, Tsardom of Russia
- Died: 17 August 1681 (aged 76) Church of St. Nicholas in Tropino, Yaroslavl, Tsardom of Russia
- Buried: New Jerusalem Monastery

Nikon (Russian: Ни́кон, Old spelling: Нїконъ), born Nikita Minin (Никита Минин; 7 May [O.S. 27 April] 1605 – 17 August [O.S. 7 August] 1681) was the seventh Patriarch of Moscow and all Rus' of the Russian Orthodox Church, serving officially from 1652 to 1666. He was renowned for his eloquence, energy, piety and close ties to Tsar Alexis of Russia. Nikon introduced many reforms, including liturgical reforms that were unpopular among conservatives. These divisions eventually led to a lasting schism known as Raskol (schism) in the Russian Orthodox Church. For many years, he was a dominant political figure, often equaling or even overshadowing the Tsar. In December 1667, Nikon was tried by a synod of church officials, deprived of all his sacerdotal functions, and reduced to the status of a simple monk.

== Early life ==
Son of a Mordvin peasant farmer named Mina, he was born on 7 May 1605 in the village of Veldemanovo, 90 versts (96 km or 60 miles) from Nizhny Novgorod. His mother died soon after he was born, and his father remarried. His stepmother mistreated him. He learned reading and writing with the parish priest. At the age of 12 he ran away from home to Makaryev Monastery where he remained until 1624 as a novice.

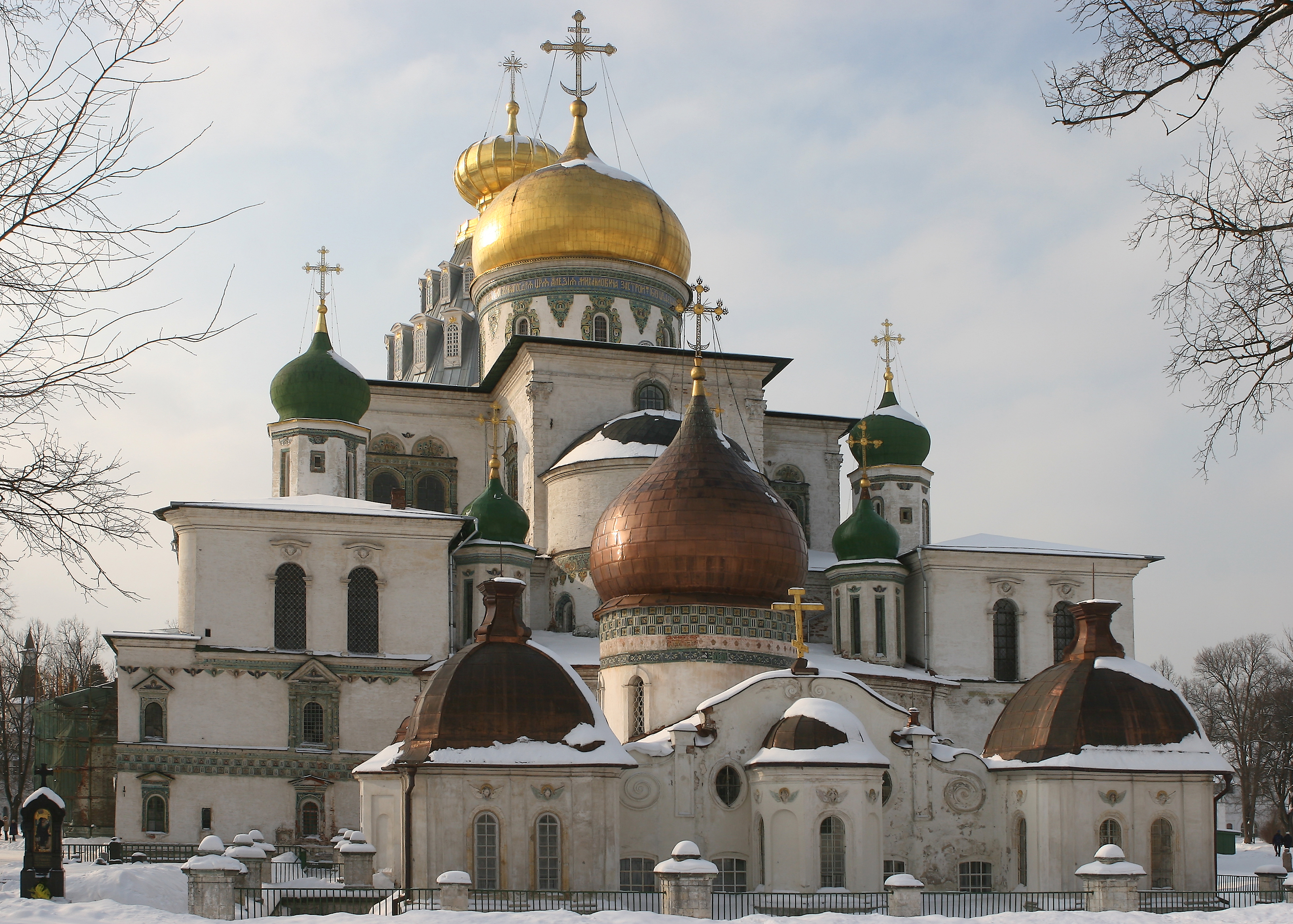
Nikon's residence at the New Jerusalem Cloister is representative of his austere aesthetic views.

Then he returned home due to his parents' insistence, married, and became a parish priest in a nearby village.

His eloquence attracted the attention of some Moscow merchants who were coming to the area because of a famous trade fair held on Makaryev Monastery grounds. Through their efforts he was invited to serve as a priest at a populous parish in the capital.

He served there about ten years. Meanwhile, by 1635, his three little children died. He saw that as a providential sign and decided to become a monk. First he persuaded his wife to take the veil and then withdrew himself to a desolate hermitage on the isle of Anzersky on the White Sea. On becoming a monk he took the name Nikon.

In 1639, he had a quarrel with the father superior, and fled the monastery by boat; a tempest broke out and his boat was cast ashore on Kiy Island, where he would later establish a great monastery. He eventually reached the Kozheozersky Monastery, in the diocese of Novgorod, of which he became abbot in 1643.

== Meeting with the Tsar ==
In his official capacity, he visited Moscow in 1646, and paid homage to the young Tsar Alexei I, as was the custom at the time. Alexei, who was rather pious, was quite impressed with Nikon, and appointed him archimandrite, or prior, of the important Novospassky monastery in Moscow. This monastery was especially associated with the House of Romanovs.

== Zealots of Piety ==
While serving at Novospassky Monastery, Nikon became a member of the circle of the Zealots of Piety. This was a group of ecclesiastical and secular individuals that started in the late 1630s, gathering around Stefan Vonifatiyev, the confessor of Tsar Alexei.

In the wake of the Time of Troubles, the members believed the problems of the time were the manifestation of a wrathful God, angry with the Russian people's lack of religiosity. The group called for the rebirth of the Russian Orthodox faith, and a renewal of the religious piety of the masses. This group included Fyodor Rtishchev, Abbot Ivan Neronov of the Kazan Cathedral, Protopope Avvakum, and others.

In 1649, Nikon became metropolitan of Great Novgorod. He was given some special privileges there. During his tenure, a riot started in the city, and Nikon was severely beaten by the mobs. Nevertheless, he managed to resolve the matters peacefully, by leading a religious procession against the rioters.

== Elected as patriarch (1652) ==
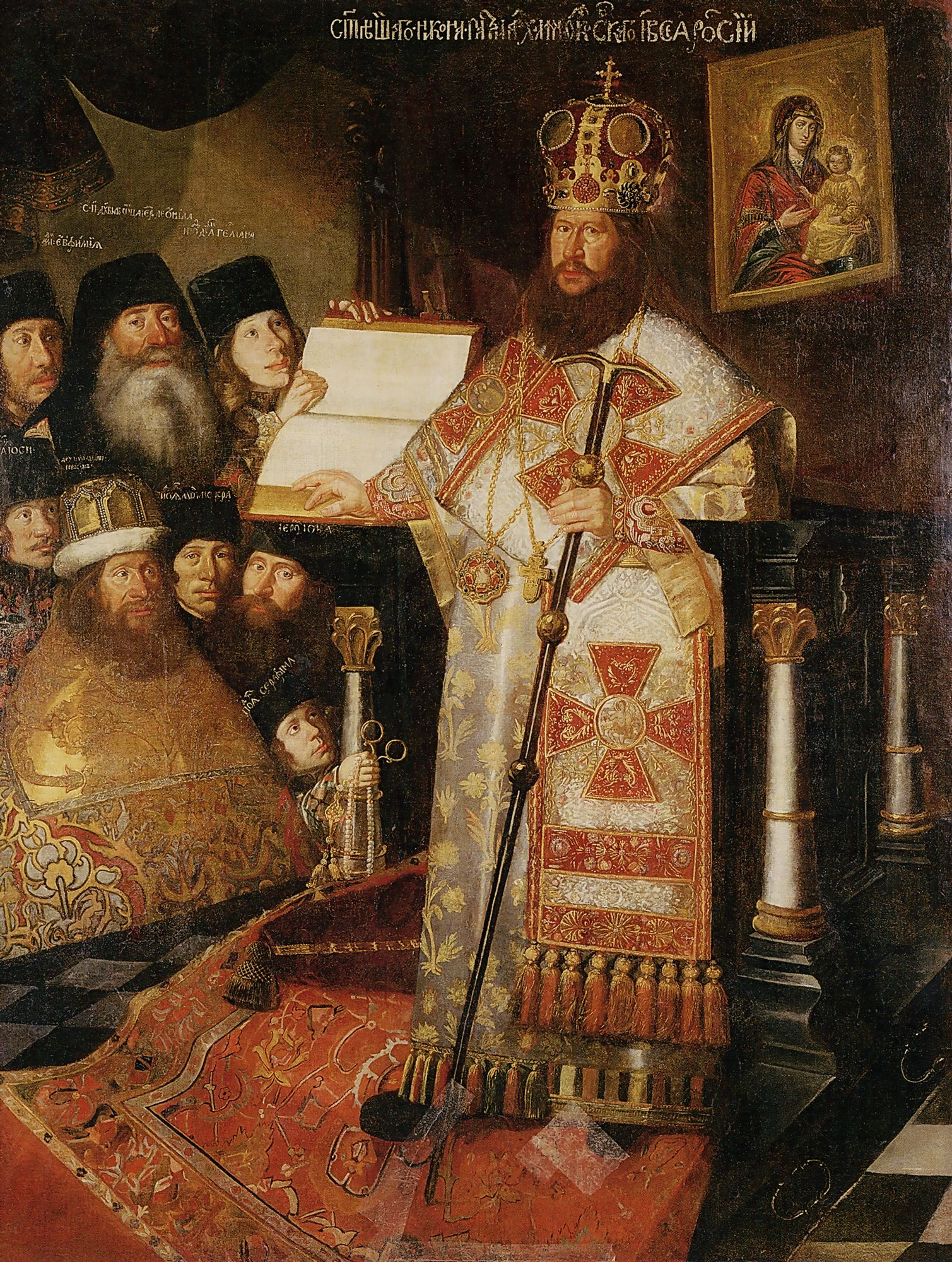
Painting of Nikon with clergy

On 1 August 1652 he was elected patriarch of Moscow. Nikon knew that he was rather unpopular with the nobility, and declined the offer several times.

It was only with the utmost difficulty that Nikon could be persuaded to become the arch-pastor of the Russian Church. He gave in after the Tsar himself and the boyars fell on their knees, begging him to accept. He only yielded after imposing upon the whole assembly a solemn vow of obedience to him in everything concerning the dogmas, canons and observances of the Orthodox Church.

== Nikon's reforms ==
When Nikon was appointed, ecclesiastical reform was already in the air. A number of ecclesiastical dignitaries, known as the party of the protopopes (deans), had accepted the responsibility for the revision of church service-books inaugurated by the late Patriarch Joasaph, and a few other minor rectifications of certain ancient observances. But they were far too timid to attempt anything really effectual.

Nikon launched bold reforms. He consulted the most learned of the Greek prelates abroad, invited them to a consultation at Moscow, and finally the scholars of Constantinople and Kiev convinced Nikon that the Muscovite service-books were heterodox, and that the icons actually in use had very widely departed from ancient Constantinopolitan models, being for the most part imbued with the Frankish and Polish (West European) baroque influences.

Nikon severely criticized the use of such new-fangled icons; he ordered a house-to-house search for them. His soldiers and servants were charged first to gouge out the eyes of these heretical counterfeits, and then carry them through the town in derision. He also issued a ukase threatening the severest penalties for all who dared to make or use such icons in the future.

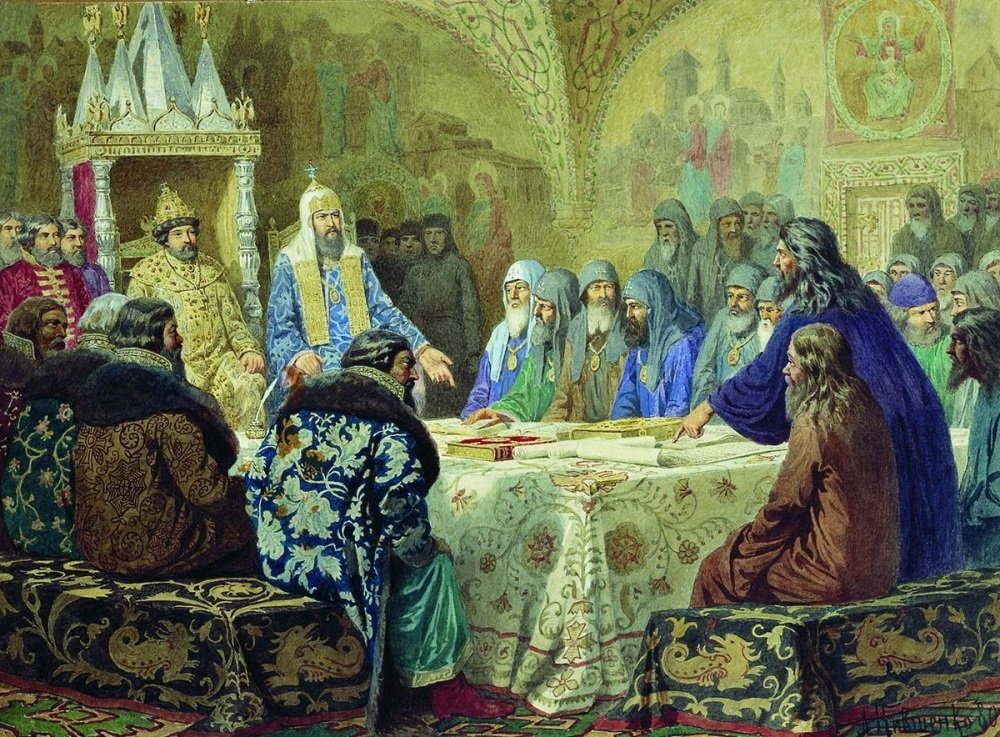
Aleksey Kivshenko. Patriarch Nikon and Epifany Slavinetsky revising service-books.

Recent research, such as that of Meyendorff, has determined that Muscovite service-books did belong to a different recension from those used by the Greeks at the time of Nikon, and the unrevised Muscovite books were actually older and more venerable than the Greek books, which had undergone several revisions over the centuries, were newer, and contained innovations.

In 1654, Nikon summoned a synod to re-examine the service-books revised by the Patriarch Josasaph, and the majority of the synod decided that "the Greeks should be followed rather than our own ancients." A second council, held in Moscow in 1656, sanctioned the revision of the service-books as suggested by the first council, and anathematized the dissenting minority, which included the party of the protopopes and Paul, bishop of Kolomna. The reforms coincided with a great plague in 1654.

Construction of tent-like churches (of which Saint Basil's Cathedral is a prime example) was strictly forbidden, and many old uncanonical churches were demolished to make way for new ones, designed in the "Old Byzantine" style. The bold reforms led to the creation of the Old Believers.

== His building program ==
He enriched the numerous monasteries which he built with valuable libraries. His emissaries scoured Muscovy and the Orient for precious Greek and Slavonic manuscripts, both sacred and profane.

Among the great monasteries he founded were Valday Iversky Monastery, the New Jerusalem Monastery, and Kiy Island Monastery.

== Political power ==
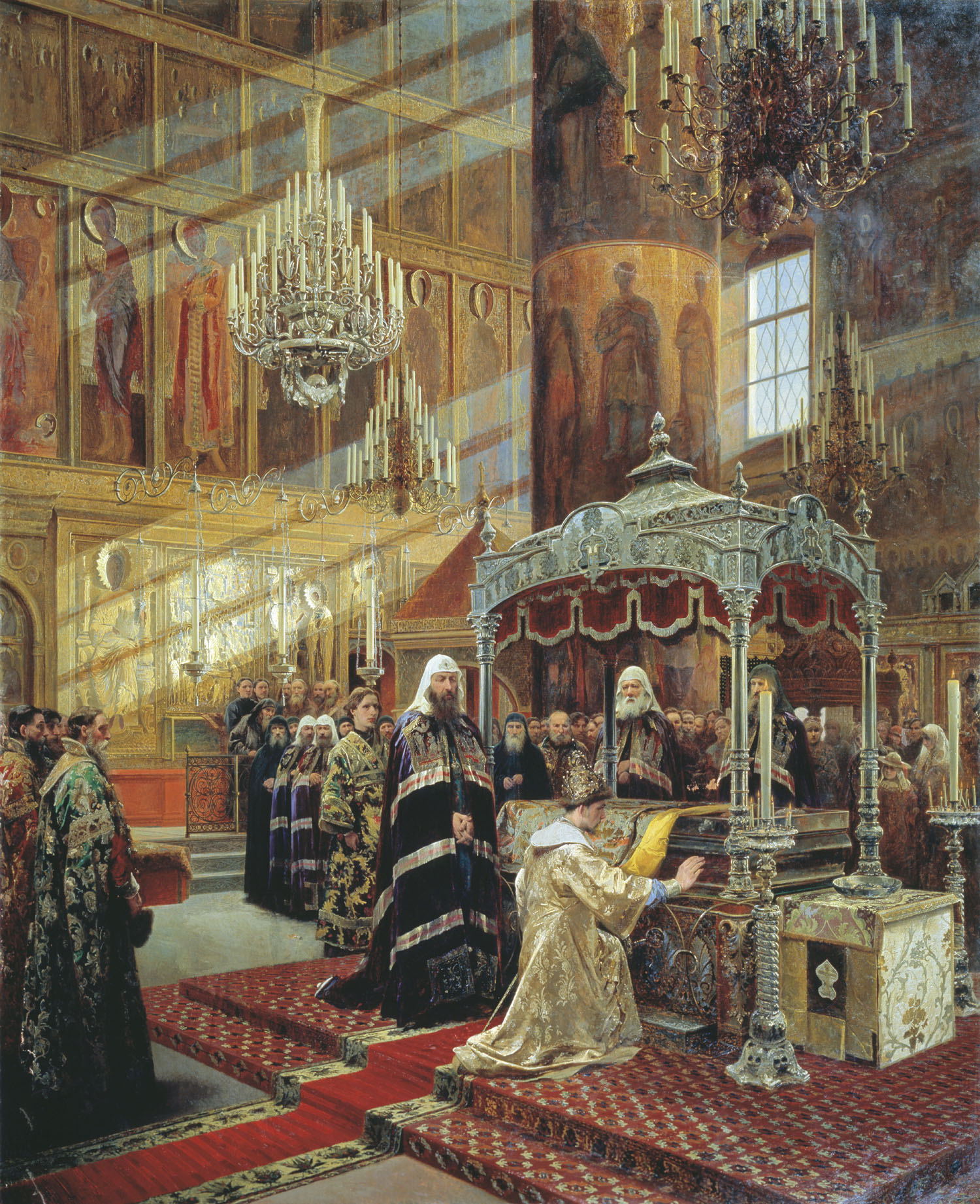
Nikon had Metropolitan Philip canonized and his relics transferred to the Moscow Kremlin as a reminder to the tsars about the crimes they had committed against the church (painting by Alexander Litovchenko).

From 1652 to 1658, Nikon was not so much the minister as the colleague of the Tsar. Both in public documents and in private letters he was permitted to use the sovereign title. This was especially the case during the wars with the Polish–Lithuanian Commonwealth in 1654–1667, when the tsar was away from Moscow with his armies. In 1654, while starting on his great military campaign, the tsar left Nikon at home as the chief ruler. Needless to say, this created some considerable resentment among the high level boyars.

Nikon made it his mission to remove the Church from secular authority, and permanently separate the Church from the state. He believed that the Church and state should work in harmony, while remaining separate from each other. He stated that "There are two swords of authority, that is, the spiritual and the secular" and that "the supreme Bishop is higher than the Tsar". He also sought to organize the Church with a hierarchy similar to the state's – with the Patriarch in complete control.. On a personal note, Nikon and Aleksei officialized their bond as the Tsar made the Patriarch godfather of all his children.

Nikon especially protested Sobornoye Ulozheniye (Russian Legal Code) of 1649, which reduced the status of the clergy, and made the Church in effect subservient to the state. Also, according to this Code, the taxation of monastery lands was used for the benefit of the state.

But his actions raised up a whole host of enemies against him, and by the summer of 1658 they had convinced Alexius that the sovereign patriarch was eclipsing the sovereign tsar. Alexius suddenly grew cold towards his own "bosom friend," as he called him.

== Nikon leaves Moscow (1658) ==
Almost as a test of wills and, perhaps, hoping to dramatize his own importance and indispensability, Nikon publicly stripped himself of his patriarchal vestments in 1658, and went to live at the New Jerusalem Monastery, that he, himself, founded in the town of Istra, 40 kilometers west of Moscow. But he actually did not officially resign from his position.

For nearly two years Tsar Alexius and Nikon remained estranged and their conflict unresolved. In February 1660 a synod was held at Moscow to elect a new Patriarch to the throne, vacant now for nearly two years. The synod decided not only that a new patriarch should be appointed, but that Nikon had forfeited both his archiepiscopal rank and his priests orders.

Against the second part of the synod's decision, however, the great ecclesiastical expert Epiphanius Slavinetsky protested energetically, and ultimately the whole inquiry collapsed. The tsar was unwilling to enforce the decrees of the synod being unsure of its ecclesiastical validity.

For six years longer Russian Orthodoxy remained without a patriarch. Every year the question of Nikon's deposition became more complicated and confusing. Almost every contemporary Eastern Orthodox scholar was consulted on the subject, and no two authorities agreed. At last the matter was submitted to a pan-Orthodox synod.

== Condemned by synod (1667) ==
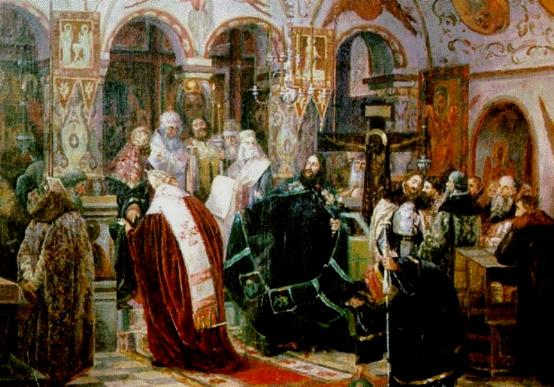
Defrocking of Patriarch Nikon

In December 1667, Nikon was tried by a synod of church officials, known as the Great Moscow Synod. It was presided over by "two foreign Patriarchs ... [and consisting of] thirteen metropolitans, nine archbishops, five bishops and thirty-two archimandrites." The two patriarchs at the synod were Paisius of Alexandria, and Macarius III of Antioch. Symeon of Polotsk was one of the key theologians preparing the documents of the synod.

According to Robert Massie, during the proceedings, Nikon staunchly defended his belief that the church's authority and power were, and ought to be, supreme; however, Nikon was rather insisting that the church's authority and power ought to be supreme only in ecclesiastical matters.

On 12 December 1667, the synod pronounced Nikon guilty of reviling the tsar and the whole Muscovite Church, of deposing Paul, Bishop of Kolomna, contrary to the canons, and of beating and torturing his dependents. His sentence was deprivation of all his sacerdotal functions; henceforth, he was to be known simply as the monk Nikon. The same day he was put into a sledge and sent as a prisoner to the far northern Ferapontov monastery. However, the very council which had deposed him confirmed all his reforms, and anathematized all who refused to accept them, like protopope Avvakum.

Nikon survived Tsar Alexis, with whom something of the old intimacy had been resumed in 1671. In 1681, the new tsar Fedor (Alexius's son), on hearing that Nikon was dying, allowed him to return to Moscow and, under a partial pardon, take up residence in his former Moscow home, the New Jerusalem Monastery. At Yaroslavl on his way there, after crossing the Kotorosl River, he died in Tropino on 17 August 1681. The monastery remained unfinished, however, but the royal family paid particular attention to ensuring its completion. Nikon's cleric later recorded that, for the church's consecration in 1685, Tserevna Tatyana prepared gold and silver, arranged for icons to be made, and personally embroidered veils to cover paraphernalia for the eucharist.

Eastern Orthodox Church titles
Preceded by Joseph	Patriarch of Moscow; 1652–58	Succeeded by Joasaphus II
