= Borisoglebsky District =

Borisoglebsky District is the name of several administrative and municipal districts in Russia.

== Places ==
=== Russia ===
- Borisoglebsky District, Yaroslavl Oblast, an administrative and municipal district of Yaroslavl Oblast.
- Borisoglebsky District, Voronezh Oblast (1928–1949, 1963–2006), a former administrative district of Voronezh Oblast.

== See also ==
- Borisoglebsky (disambiguation)
