= Veldemanovo =

Village in Perevozsky District, Russia

Veldemanovo (Russian: Вельдеманово) is a village in the Perevozsky District of the Nizhny Novgorod Oblast. Until May 31, 2017, Veldemanovo was part of the Central Village Council. According to the results of the 2002 Russian census, Russians made up 97 percent of the 512 people in the village.

== Notable people ==
- Patriarch Nikon of Moscow
