= Borisoglebsky, Yaroslavl Oblast =

Borisoglebsky Борисоглебский
- Urban-type settlement
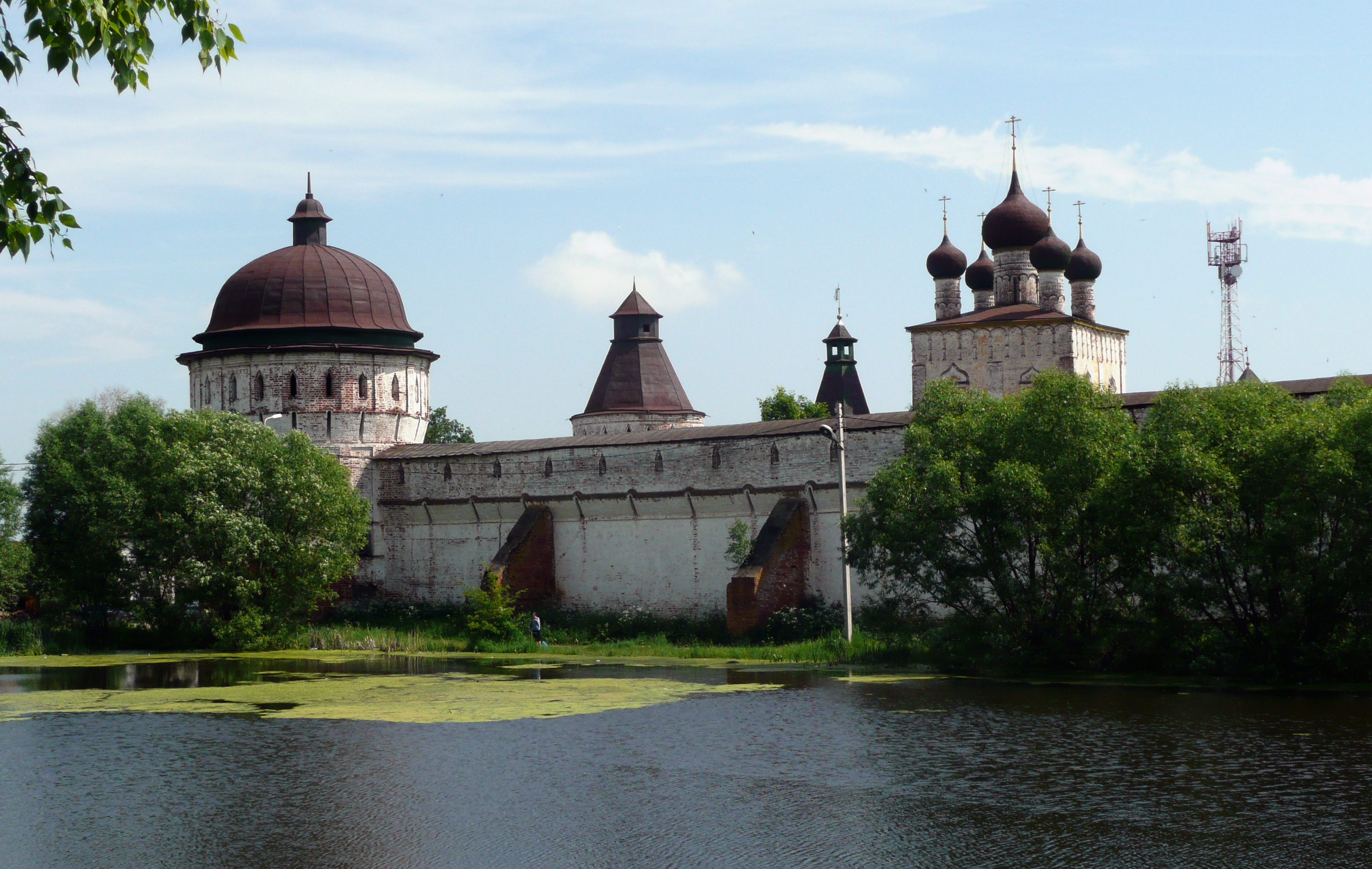
- Monastery of Sts. Boris and Gleb
- Interactive map of Borisoglebsky
- Location of Borisoglebsky Borisoglebsky (Yaroslavl Oblast)
- Coordinates: 57°16′N 39°09′E
- Country: Russia
- Federal subject: Yaroslavl Oblast
- Administrative district: Borisoglebsky District
- Founded: 1363 (Julian)
- Elevation: 120 m (390 ft)

Population (2010 Census)
  - Total: 5,646
  - Estimate (1 January 2018): 5,405 (−4.3%)
- Time zone: UTC+3 (MSK)
- Postal code: 152170
- OKTMO ID: 78606407051

Borisoglebsky (Russian: Борисогле́бский) is an urban locality (an urban-type settlement) and the administrative center of Borisoglebsky District of Yaroslavl Oblast, Russia, located on the Ustye River, 16 kilometers (9.9 mi) from Rostov and 77 kilometers (48 mi) southwest of Yaroslavl. Population: 5,646 (2010 census); 5,957 (2002 census); 6,327 (1989 Soviet census); 4,600 (1968).

The settlement's principal tourist attraction is the famous Borisoglebsky Monastery, now a museum. The monastery is named after Saints Boris and Gleb. The monastery was favored by Ivan the Terrible who personally supervised the construction of towered walls and bell-tower around an even more ancient cathedral. The only addition made to the monastery after Ivan's death is a superb carved barbican church, commissioned by the metropolitan Iona Sysoevich in the late 17th century.

In 2005, the statues of monk Peresvet (by Zurab Tsereteli) and of Prince Pozharsky were installed near the monastery walls.
