= Bible translations into Russian =

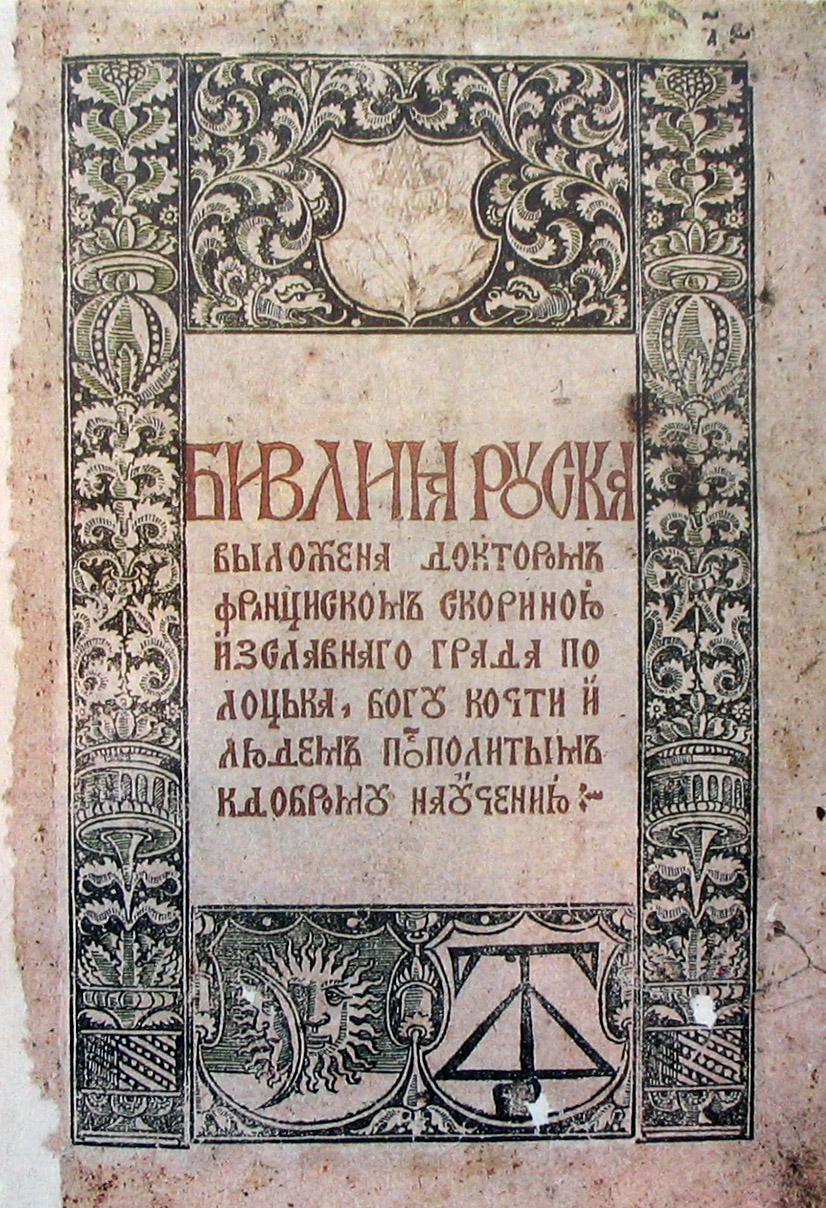
Biblia Ruska of Skaryna

The tradition of Bible translations in Christianity in Russia begins with Slavic translations of the Bible and Old Church Slavonic.

Tsar Peter the Great felt that the Russian people needed a Bible in the vernacular and authorized Pastor Johann Ernst Glück in 1703 to prepare such an edition. Glück died in 1705 and nothing is known of his work.

== Early East Slavic translation projects ==
Francysk Skaryna (ca 1490-1552?) was the first to attempt the translation and printing of the Bible in Ruthenian, based on the Slavonic and Czech Bibles. August Hermann Francke (1663–1727) tried to produce a cheap Russian Bible.

== Orthodox Church version ==
The first Orthodox Church Bible appeared in 1876. It was left to the 19th century in connection with the establishment of the Russian Bible Society (founded in 1812 at Saint Petersburg, with the consent of Alexander I) to prepare a Bible in the vernacular. The work was undertaken by Filaret, rector of the Theological Academy of Saint Petersburg (afterward metropolitan of Moscow), and other members of the faculty of the academy.

The Gospels were published in 1818 and in 1822 the entire New Testament. In 1820 the translation of the Old Testament was undertaken, and in 1822 Philaret's translation of the Psalms was published. In 1825 the Pentateuch, Joshua, Judges, and Ruth were issued. The year 1826 saw an end to the activity of the Bible Society in the ban put upon all kinds of private associations, even when non-political. Not before 1858 was the work of translation resumed. In 1876 the entire Bible was published in one volume. This translation is called the Synod Version. The Old Testament books, though based upon the Hebrew Bible, follow the order of the Septuagint and the Church Slavonic Bible. The Apocryphal books also form a part of the Russian Bible. The British and Foreign Bible Society also issued a Russian edition, omitting, however, the Apocrypha.

== Recent versions ==
Since 1990 the Russian Bible Society and Protestants in Russia have produced newer translations into the Russian language. In September, 2000 the International Bible Society completed a Dynamic equivalence translation called Slovo Zhizny, the Russian equivalent of the English New International Version. In May 2015 the Bible Translation Institute (BTI) at Zaoksky Theological Seminary in Russia published jointly with St. Andrew's Biblical Theological Institute in Moscow a new translation of the Holy Scriptures from the original languages. This translation has been prepared by an inter-denominational team of scholars under the editorial direction of M.P. Kulakov and M.M. Kulakov. Jehovah's Witnesses in 2007 have translated their New World Translation of the Holy Scriptures into Russian.

- «Святая Библия, Новый Перевод на Русский Язык» (The Holy Bible, New Russian Translation (NRT)) by the International Bible Society.
- «Библия, Современный русский перевод» (The Bible, Modern Russian Translation) by the Russian Bible Society.
- «Священное Писание. Смысловой перевод Таурата, Книги Пророков, Забура и Инжила» by the International Society of the Holy Scripture (Международное общество Священного Писания (МОСП)).
- «Священное Писание. Перевод нового мира». Russian translation of the New World Translation of the Holy Scriptures.
- «Библия. Книги Священного Писания Ветхого и Нового Завета в современном русском переводе» под ред. М.П. Кулакова и М.М. Кулакова. Translated by BTI and St. Andrew's Biblical Theological Institute.

== Bibliography ==
- Stephen K. Batalden. Russian Bible wars: modern scriptural translation and cultural authority. Cambridge: Cambridge University Press, 2013.
