= Rytovo =

Rural locality in Vyaznikovsky District, Vladimir Oblast, Russia

Coordinates: 56°01.145′N 42°04.22′E

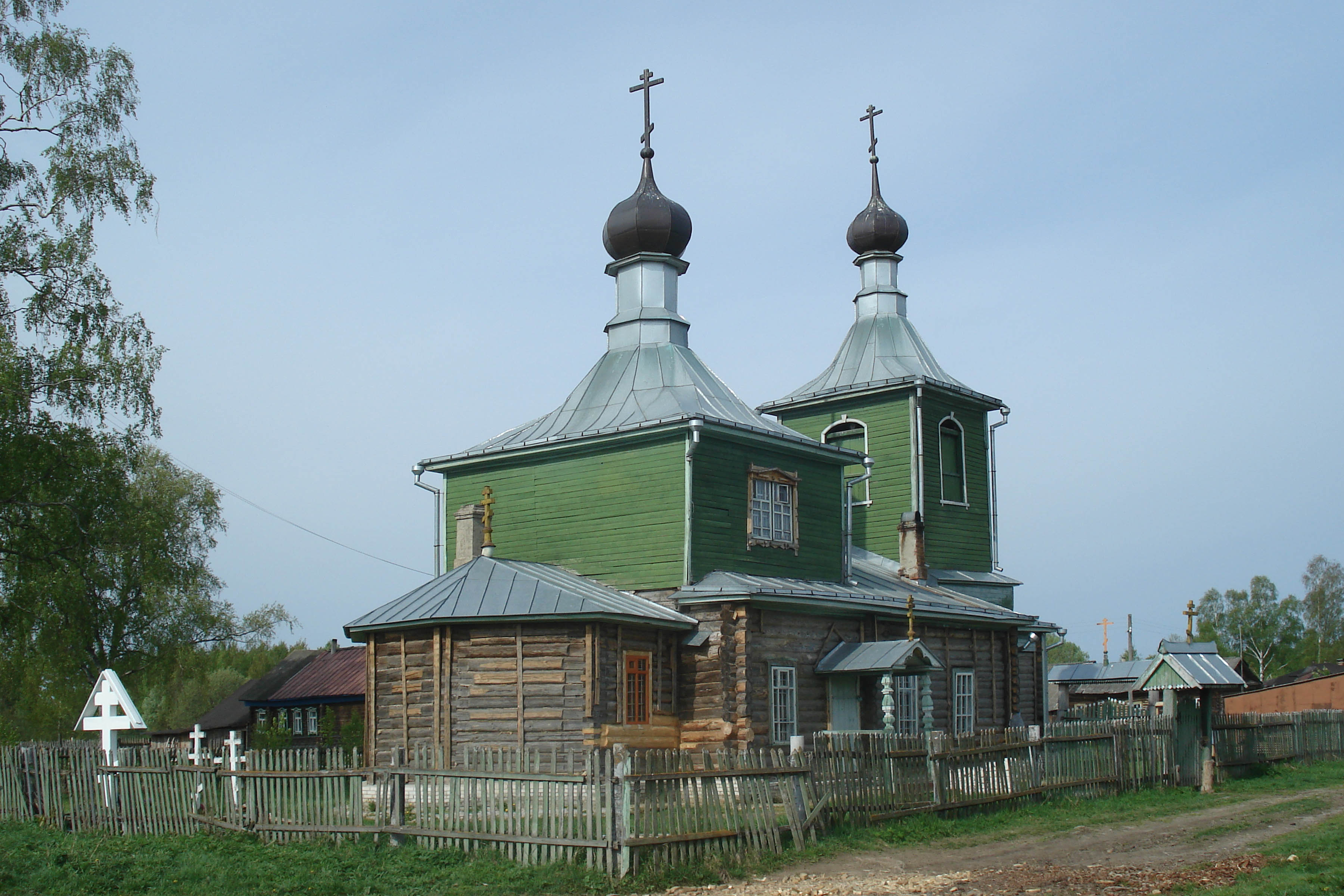
Old Believers Dormition church in Rytovo. The white cross on the left is the tomb of Livery (Gusev).

Rytovo (Russian: Ры́тово) is a village in Vyaznikovsky District of Vladimir Oblast, Russia, Population: 41 (2008). Postal code: 601434.

Municipally, the village is a part of Paustovskoye Rural Settlement (the administrative center of which is the village of Paustovo).

== Old Believers ==
Rytovo is one of the traditional centers of Old Believers in Russia. The Uspensky (Dormition) church in Rytovo is one of few Old Believers' churches which had not been closed during the Soviet times. The parish and the church were established in the end of the 19th century by the famous Old Believer Bishop Arseny Shvetsov of the Urals.

From 1966 to 2005, the prior of Rytovo was Livery (Gusev), brother of Alimpy (Gusev), who served as the First Hierarch of the Russian Orthodox Old-Rite Church from 1986 to 2003.
