= Kotorosl =

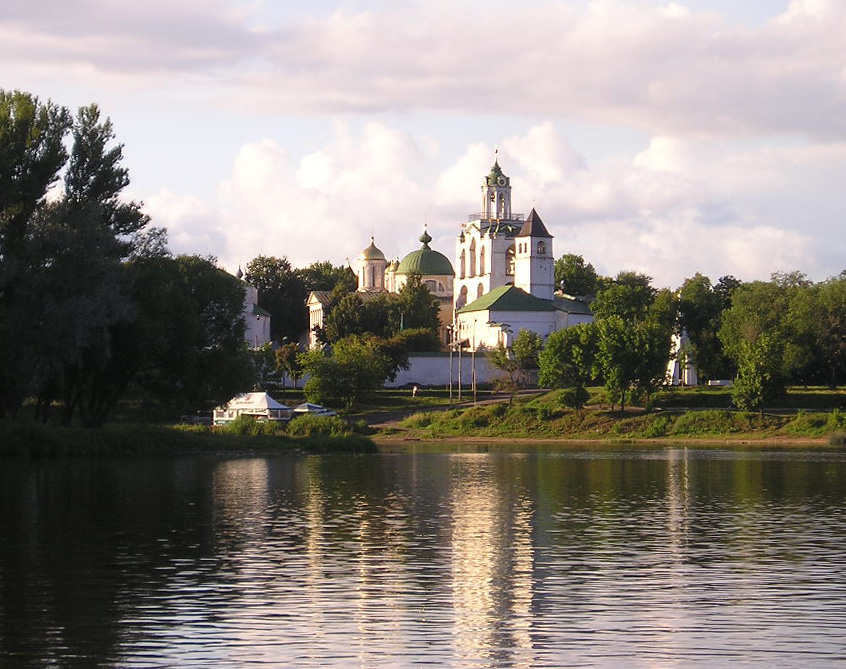
- Kotorosl River in Yaroslavl
- Native name: Которосль (Russian)

Location
- Country: Russia

Physical characteristics
- Mouth: Volga
  - coordinates: 57.6161°N 39.9058°E
- Length: 132 km (82 mi)
- Basin size: 6,370 km^{2} (2,460 sq mi)

Basin features
- Progression: Volga→ Caspian Sea

The Kotorosl (Russian: Ко́торосль) is a right tributary of the Volga in Yaroslavl Oblast, Russia. The river flows from Lake Nero near Rostov past Karabikha and enters the Volga in Yaroslavl. It is 132 kilometres (82 mi) long, and has a drainage basin of 6,370 square kilometres (2,460 sq mi).

In the medieval ages, the river was highly important strategically, for it connected Rostov with major waterways of Russia. The Kotorosl's main tributary is the Ustye, which flows past Semibratovo to Borisogleb, discharging into the Ustye from the left.
