= Borisoglebskoye, Vologda Oblast =

Borisoglebskoye Борисоглебское
- Village
- Location within Vologda Oblast Location within Russia
- Coordinates: 59°27′N 39°09′E
- Country: Russia
- Region: Vologda Oblast
- District: Vologodsky District
- Time zone: UTC+3:00

Borisoglebskoye (Russian: Борисоглебское) is a rural locality (a village) in Kubenskoye Rural Settlement, Vologodsky District, Vologda Oblast, Russia. The population was 30 as of 2002.

== Geography ==
Borisoglebskoye is located 65 km northwest of Vologda (the district's administrative centre) by road. Mynchakovo is the nearest rural locality.
