= Ustye (river) =

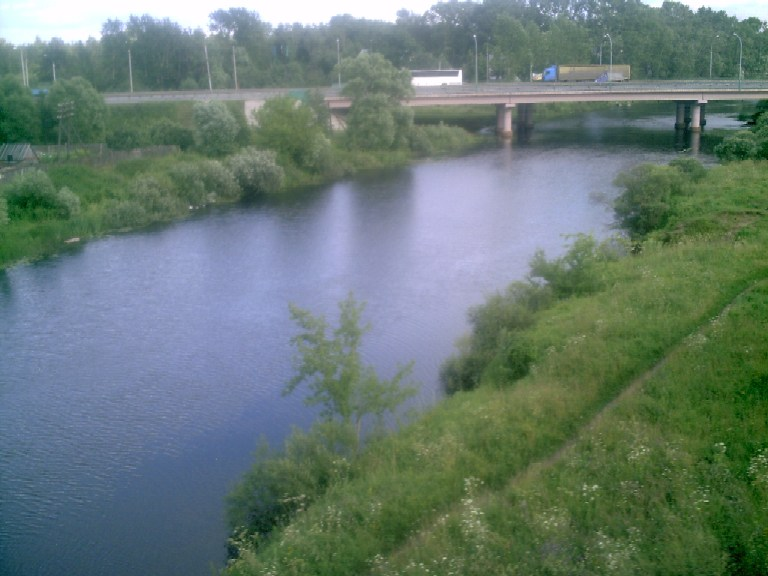
- Native name: Устье (Russian)

Location
- Country: Russia

Physical characteristics
- Mouth: Kotorosl
  - coordinates: 57.2454°N 39.5199°E
- Length: 153 km (95 mi)
- Basin size: 2,530 km^{2} (980 sq mi)

Basin features
- Progression: Kotorosl→ Volga→ Caspian Sea

The Ustye (Russian: Устье) is a river in Yaroslavl Oblast in Russia, a left tributary of the river Kotorosl (Volga's basin). The river is 153 kilometres (95 mi) long, and the area of its drainage basin is 2,530 square kilometres (980 mi^{2}). The Ustye freezes up in November and remains icebound until the end March to early April.
