= Russian Synodal Bible =

Russian non-Church Slavonic translation of the Bible, published in the 19th century

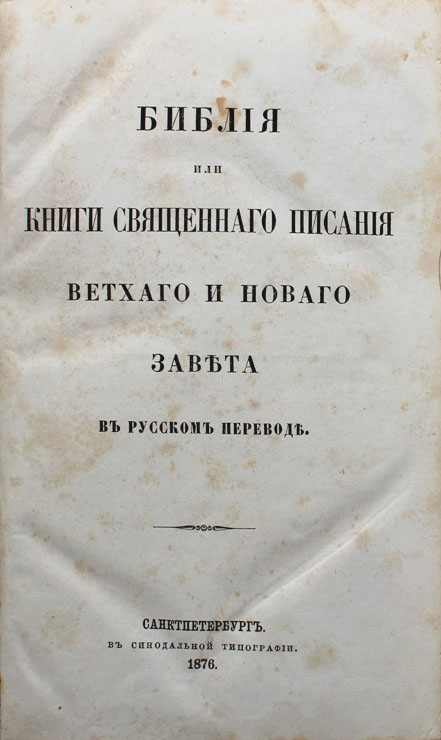
- Title page of the original first edition - 1876
- Full name: Библия. Книги Священного Писания Ветхого и Нового Завета
- Language: Russian
- NT published: 1822
- Complete Bible published: 1876
- Online as: Russian Synodal Bible at Wikisource
- Apocrypha: 1 Esdras, 2 Esdras, 3 Maccabees
- Authorship: Philaret Drozdov, Daniel Chwolson, Serafim Glagolevskiy, Mikhail Desnitsky, Moisey Aleksandrovich Golubev, Pavel Ivanovich Savvaitov, Evgraf Ivanovich Lovyagin, Ivan Egorovich Troitsky, Gerasim Petrovich Pavskiy, Makary Glukharyov, Vasily Borisovich Bazhanov, Isidor Nikol’sky
- Textual basis: Masoretic Text, Septuagint, Elizabeth Bible, Vulgate, Textus Receptus (Elzevir)
- Publisher: Синодальная типография (Synodal Printing House)
- Copyright: Public domain
- Religious affiliation: Russian Orthodox Church
- Webpage: www.patriarchia.ru/bible/gen/
- Genesis 1:1–3 В начале сотворил Бог небо и землю. Земля же была безвидна и пуста, и тьма над бездною, и Дух Божий носился над водою. И сказал Бог: да будет свет. И стал свет. John 3:16 Ибо так возлюбил Бог мир, что отдал Сына Своего Единородного, дабы всякий верующий в Него, не погиб, но имел жизнь вечную.

The Russian Synodal Bible (Russian: Синодальный перевод, The Synodal Translation) is a Russian non-Church Slavonic translation of the Bible commonly used by the Russian Orthodox Church, Catholic, as well as Russian Baptists and other Protestant communities in Russia. The translation dates to the period 1813–1875, and the first complete edition was published in 1876. The first edition in modernized orthography appeared in 1956. The first digital edition was prepared by the Moscow Patriarchate in 2000.

== History ==
The translation began in 1813, after the establishment of the Russian Bible Society and by permission of Czar Alexander I. The complete New Testament was published in 1820 and the Old Testament was already translated up to the book of Ruth when work on the project was halted in 1825. In that year the Russian Bible Society was disbanded and its translation work discontinued under a more conservative emperor Nicholas I (between 1825 and 1855) due to its suspected seditious influence on the Russian population. It was again resumed and completed in the next reign, of Alexander II.

The Most Holy Synod entrusted the completion of the translation to four Orthodox theological academies, in Moscow, Saint Petersburg, Kazan and Kiev. The complete Bible was published in 1876 and included the 1820s translation of the New Testament with very few changes, as well as the Old Testament, whose translation reflected the work done both before and after the period of reaction. The final editorship was performed by Filaret, Metropolitan of Moscow.

The translation of the Old Testament is based on the Jewish Masoretic Text, while that of the New Testament is based on the Greek printed editions of that time. This decision was grounded on Filaret's 1834 note "On the need of the Russian Church for a translation of the whole Bible from the original texts to the modern Russian language" and reflected the growing acceptance in the Russian theological community of the contemporary Western standards of Biblical scholarship of the time.

Official permission to use the Masoretic Text as preserved by the Jews (rather than relying on the Greek Septuagint and/or the Church Slavonic translations as preserved by the Christians) was granted to Filaret by the Synod in 1862, even though technically the translation was already mostly completed by that time.

In the 1870s, when the complete Russian Bible was being finalized, the linguistic norms of the Russian language had already changed when compared to those of the early 19th century, when most of the translation work was completed. Nevertheless, the translations that were done earlier remained largely unchanged, due mostly to the considerably smaller scale of the entire translation project compared to what was done by the Russian Bible Society before it was closed in the 1820s.

The translation retains a strong reliance on the vocabulary and style of the Church Slavonic translation (9th century, first printed 1564). The Synodal version remains a linguistic phenomenon of its own kind that left an imprint on both modern spoken Russian and literary Russian by introducing certain distinctive features of Church Slavonic.

A new edition of the 1876 translation was published in 1917, just before the Russian revolution. The Moscow Patriarchate under Alexy I published the first edition in post-1917 orthography in 1956. Beyond the orthographic changes, there were minimal corrections and some changes bring the text closer to modern standard Russian. A new edition of 1968 included two maps and again had some modernisations of spelling and punctuation. An edition published 1988 was almost identical to the 1968 one, with the correction a few typographical errors and the inclusion of three new maps. While the 1968 was almost exclusively for the internal use by the Russian Orthodox Church, the 1988 was sold publicly, and scans of this edition were uploaded to the early internet. The first edition in digital typeset appeared in 2000, again with some normalization in spelling, punctuation and grammar. This edition had very limited circulation in printed form but was published digitally on the website of the Moscow Patriarchate. A new edition published in 2008 again adapted some spellings (such as святого for святаго, шестой for шестый). The maps are the same as in the 1988 edition, but reproduced in better quality. The 2008 edition was reprinted in 2012, with the correction of a few misprints.

== Text samples ==
Book	Church Slavonic (Elizabeth Bible 1756)	Russian (Synodal Translation 1876/7)	Russian (Synodal Translation 2000)
Genesis 1:1-5; Бытие 1:1-5	Въ нача́лѣ сотворѝ бг҃ъ не́бо и҆ зе́млю. Землѧ́ же бѣ̀ неви́дима и҆ неꙋстро́ена, и҆ тма̀ верхꙋ̀ бе́здны, и҆ дх҃ъ бж҃їй ноша́шесѧ верхꙋ̀ воды̀. И҆ речѐ бг҃ъ: да бꙋ́детъ свѣ́тъ. И҆ бы́сть свѣ́тъ. И҆ ви́дѣ бг҃ъ свѣ́тъ, ꙗ҆́кѡ добро̀, и҆ разлꙋчѝ бг҃ъ междꙋ̀ свѣ́томъ и҆ междꙋ̀ тмо́ю. И҆ наречѐ бг҃ъ свѣ́тъ де́нь, а҆ тмꙋ̀ наречѐ но́щь. И҆ бы́сть ве́черъ, и҆ бы́сть ѹ҆́тро, де́нь є҆ди́нъ.	Въ началѣ сотворил Богъ небо и землю. Земля же была безвидна и пуста, и тьма над бездною, и Духъ Божій носился надъ водою. И сказалъ Богъ: да будетъ свѣтъ; И сталъ свѣтъ. И увидѣлъ Богъ свѣтъ, что он хорошъ; и отдѣлилъ Богъ свѣтъ отъ тьмы. И назвалъ Богъ свѣтъ днемъ, а тьму ночью. И былъ вечеръ, и было утро: день одинъ.	В начале сотворил Бог небо и землю. Земля же была безвидна и пуста, и тьма над бездною, и Дух Божий носился над водою. И сказал Бог: да будет свет. И стал свет. И увидел Бог свет, что он хорош, и отделил Бог свет от тьмы. И назвал Бог свет днем, а тьму ночью. И был вечер, и было утро: день один.
John 1:1-5; От Иоанна 1:1-5	Въ нача́лѣ бѣ̀ сло́во, и҆ сло́во бѣ̀ ꙾къ бг҃ꙋ꙾, и҆ бг҃ъ бѣ̀ сло́во. Се́й бѣ̀ и҆сконѝ ꙾къ бг҃ꙋ꙾: всѧ̑ тѣ́мъ бы́ша, и҆ без̾ негѡ̀ ничто́же бы́сть, є҆́же бы́сть. Въ то́мъ живо́тъ бѣ̀, и҆ живо́тъ бѣ̀ свѣ́тъ человѣ́кѡмъ: и҆ свѣ́тъ во тмѣ̀ свѣ́титсѧ, и҆ тма̀ є҆гѡ̀ не ѡ҆б̾ѧ́тъ.	Въ началѣ было Слово, и Слово было у Бога, и Слово было Богъ. Оно было въ начале у Бога. Все чрезъ Него начало быть, и безъ Него ни что не начало быть, что начало быть. Въ Немъ была жизнь, и жизнь была свѣтъ человѣковъ. И свѣтъ во тьмѣ свѣтитъ, и тьма не объяла его.	В начале было Слово, и Слово было у Бога, и Слово было Бог. Оно было в начале у Бога. Все чрез Него начало быть, и без Него ничто не начало быть, что начало быть. В Нем была жизнь, и жизнь была свет человеков. И свет во тьме светит, и тьма не объяла его.
John 3:16; От Иоанна 3:16	Та́кѡ бо возлюбѝ бг҃ъ мі́ръ, ꙗ҆́кѡ и҆ сн҃а своего̀ є҆диноро́днаго да́лъ є҆́сть, да всѧ́къ вѣ́рꙋѧй въ ѻ҆́нь не поги́бнетъ, но и҆́мать живо́тъ вѣ́чный.	Ибо такъ возлюбилъ Богъ міръ, что отдалъ Сына своего единороднаго, дабы всякій, вѣрующій въ Него, не погибъ, но имѣлъ жизнь вѣчную.	Ибо так возлюбил Бог мир, что отдал Сына Своего Единородного, дабы всякий верующий в Него, не погиб, но имел жизнь вечную.
1 John 5:7; Первое послание Иоанна 5:7	Ꙗ҆́кѡ трїѐ сꙋ́ть свидѣ́телствꙋющїи на нб҃сѝ, ѻ҆ц҃ъ, сло́во и҆ ст҃ы́й дх҃ъ: и҆ сі́и трѝ є҆ди́но сꙋ́ть.	Ибо три свидѣтельствуютъ на небѣ: Отецъ, Слово и Святый Духъ; и сіи три суть едино.	Ибо три свидетельствуют на небе: Отец, Слово и Святый Дух; и Сии три суть едино.

== See also ==
- Russian Bible Society
- Bible translations into Russian
