= Bible Society in Russia =

The Bible Society in Russia (Russian: Российское Библейское Общество, romanized: Rossiyskoe Bibleyskoe Obshchestvo) is a branch of the British and Foreign Bible Society, a Christian non-denominational organization for translating and distributing the Bible in Russia, in languages and formats accessible to anyone.

== Early history ==
The first attempts to translate books of the Bible into the modern Russian language of the time took place in the 16th and 17th centuries. However, these works (undertaken by deacon of Posolsky Prikaz Avraamiy Firsov, pastor E. Gluk, and archbishop Methodiy Smirnov), were lost during political turbulence and wars.

A full-scale Bible translation into the Russian language began in 1813, after the establishment of the Bible Society in Russia. The full edition of the Bible with both the Old Testament and the New Testament was published in 1876. This work, called the Russian Synodal Bible, is widely used by Catholic and Protestant communities all over Russia and in the former soviet states, and is also used by many Russian Orthodox adherents for all kinds of teaching and private study, outside of liturgical use (for which the Old Church Slavonic version is preferred). More recently, several modern translations have appeared. The Bible Society in Russia, between its establishment in 1813 and 1826, distributed more than 500,000 Bible-related books in 41 languages of Russia. This early work was led by Dr John Paterson, D.D. (1776 - 1855) a young Scottish Minister. Dr Paterson was granted an ukase to publish bibles by Tsar Alexander I who actively supported the work of the Bible Society in Russia and provided a building beside the Catherine Canal (now Griboyedov Canal) for the Society's use. The work of the Society ended when Nicholas I placed the Society under the control of the Holy Synod. Dr Paterson returned to Scotland and lived until 1855 on a pension from Tsar Nicholas. Several times in the 19th and 20th centuries, activities of the Society were stopped by reactionary policies of the Russian Government.

== Recent history ==
The Society was restored in 1990-1991 after a pause connected with the Soviet regime restrictions.

The opening ceremony of the Building of the Bible Society in Russia in Moscow was visited by representatives of Orthodox, Roman Catholic, and Protestant churches, who joined their efforts in the cause of Bible translation and distribution. The well-known Orthodox priest and theologian Alexander Men was one of the leaders of the refounded institution.

The editions of the Society are based on the universal doctrine of the early Christian church and include non-confessional comments. Over 1,000,000 Bible-related books are printed per year by that institution. The Bible is also being translated into more than 50 native languages and dialects of the ethnic groups in Russia.

Since 1995, the Bible Society in Russia is a member of the United Bible Societies association.
