= Ecclesiastical dignitary =

An ecclesiastical dignitary is a member of a cathedral chapter, or collegiate church. These offices can include the provost, the dean, the custos and the scholasticus.
