= Borisoglebsky District, Yaroslavl Oblast =

Borisoglebsky District Борисоглебский район (Russian)
- District
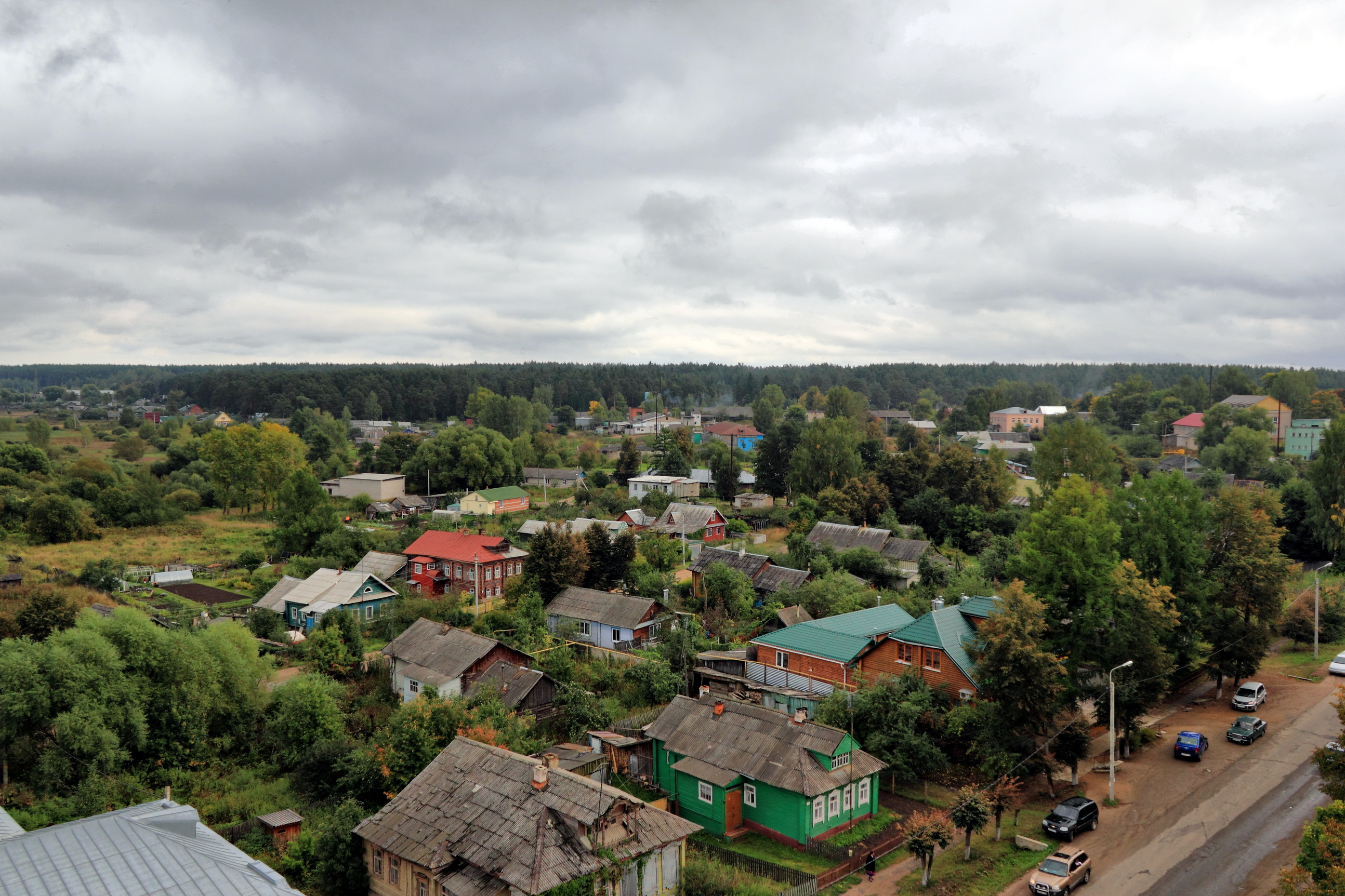
- The work settlement of Borisoglebsky, the administrative center of Borisoglebsky District

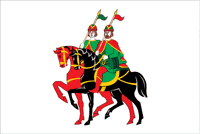
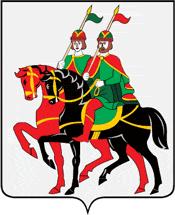
- Flag Coat of arms
- Location of Borisoglebsky District in Yaroslavl Oblast
- Coordinates: 57°16′N 39°09′E
- Country: Russia
- Federal subject: Yaroslavl Oblast
- Established: 1929
- Administrative center: Borisoglebsky

Area
  - Total: 1,750 km^{2} (680 sq mi)

Population (2010 Census)
  - Total: 12,630
  - Estimate (2018): 11,850 (−6.2%)
  - Density: 7.22/km^{2} (18.7/sq mi)
  - Urban: 44.7%
  - Rural: 55.3%

Administrative structure
  - Administrative divisions: 1 Work settlements, 12 Rural okrugs
  - Inhabited localities: 1 urban-type settlements, 275 rural localities

Municipal structure
  - Municipally incorporated as: Borisoglebsky Municipal District
  - Municipal divisions: 0 urban settlements, 5 rural settlements
- Time zone: UTC+3 (MSK)
- OKTMO ID: 78606000
- Website: http://www.borisogleb.ru/

Borisoglebsky District (Russian: Борисогле́бский райо́н) is an administrative and municipal district (raion), one of the seventeen in Yaroslavl Oblast, Russia. It is located in the center of the oblast. The area of the district is 1,750 square kilometers (680 sq mi). Its administrative center is the urban locality (a work settlement) of Borisoglebsky. Population: 12,630 (2010 Census); 14,847 (2002 census); 15,967 (1989 Soviet census). The population of the administrative center accounts for 44.7% of the district's total population.
