= Russian Uruguayans =

Ethnic group

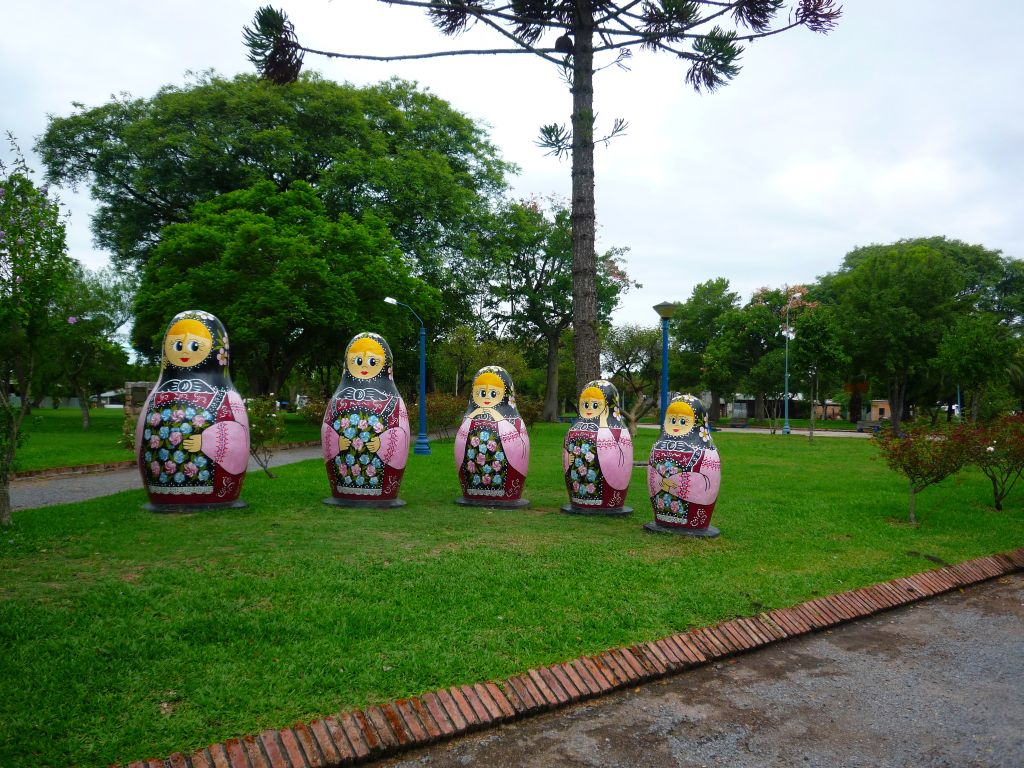
Plaza de la Libertad, San Javier.

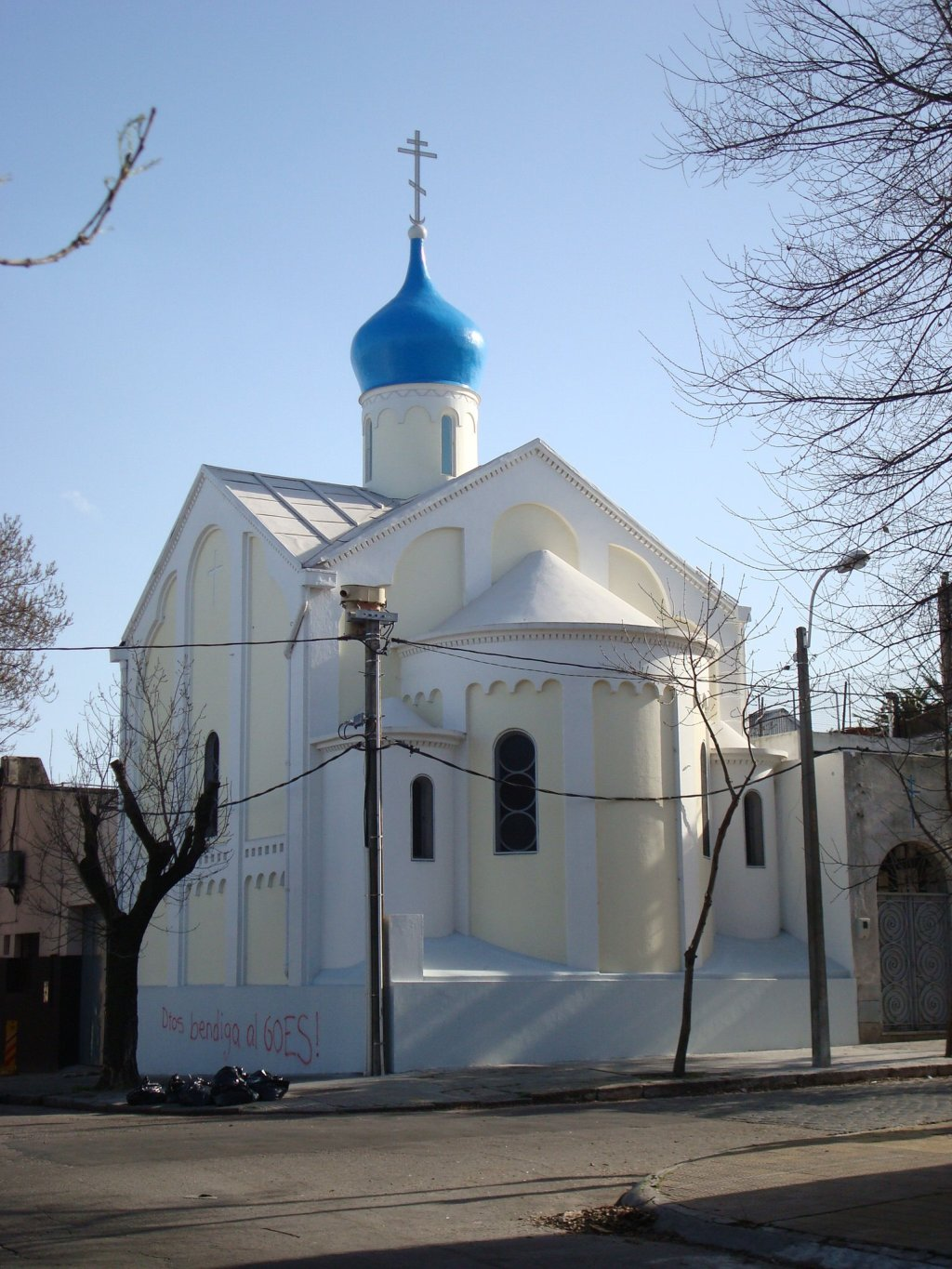
Iglesia Ortodoxa Rusa de la Resurrección, Montevideo.

Russian Uruguayans are people born in Russia who live in Uruguay or Uruguay-born people of Russian descent. They are a local ethnic minority.

== Overview ==
The most important places in Uruguay with a strong presence of people of Russian descent are:

- San Javier, which has the largest population of persons of Russian descent
- Colonia Ofir, a settlement of Old Believers

There is a small Russian presence in Montevideo, where there can be found the only Russian Orthodox church in Uruguay.

Also among the Jewish Uruguayan community there are some people of Russian-Jewish descent.

=== Recent trends ===
In the 2020s, hundreds of Russian immigrants have applied for Uruguayan residency, far more than in the entire decade before the COVID pandemic. And among the newcomers there are many professionals, many same-sex couples, or both at the same time. All of them consider that in Uruguay there are three differentials that explain the rise of Russian immigration: freedom, peace, and political stability.

== Russian Uruguayans ==
- Jorge Chebataroff, geographer, botanist and biologist
- Vasiliy Semionovitch Lubkov, cleric, spiritual leader of New Israel
- Vladimir Roslik, physician, victim of the military dictatorship
- José Serebrier, conductor and composer
- Alejandro Stock, artist
- Volf Roitman, painter, sculptor, and architect

== See also ==
- Russia–Uruguay relations
- Russian diaspora
- Immigration to Uruguay
- Russian Mennonites in Uruguay
