= Molokans in Armenia =

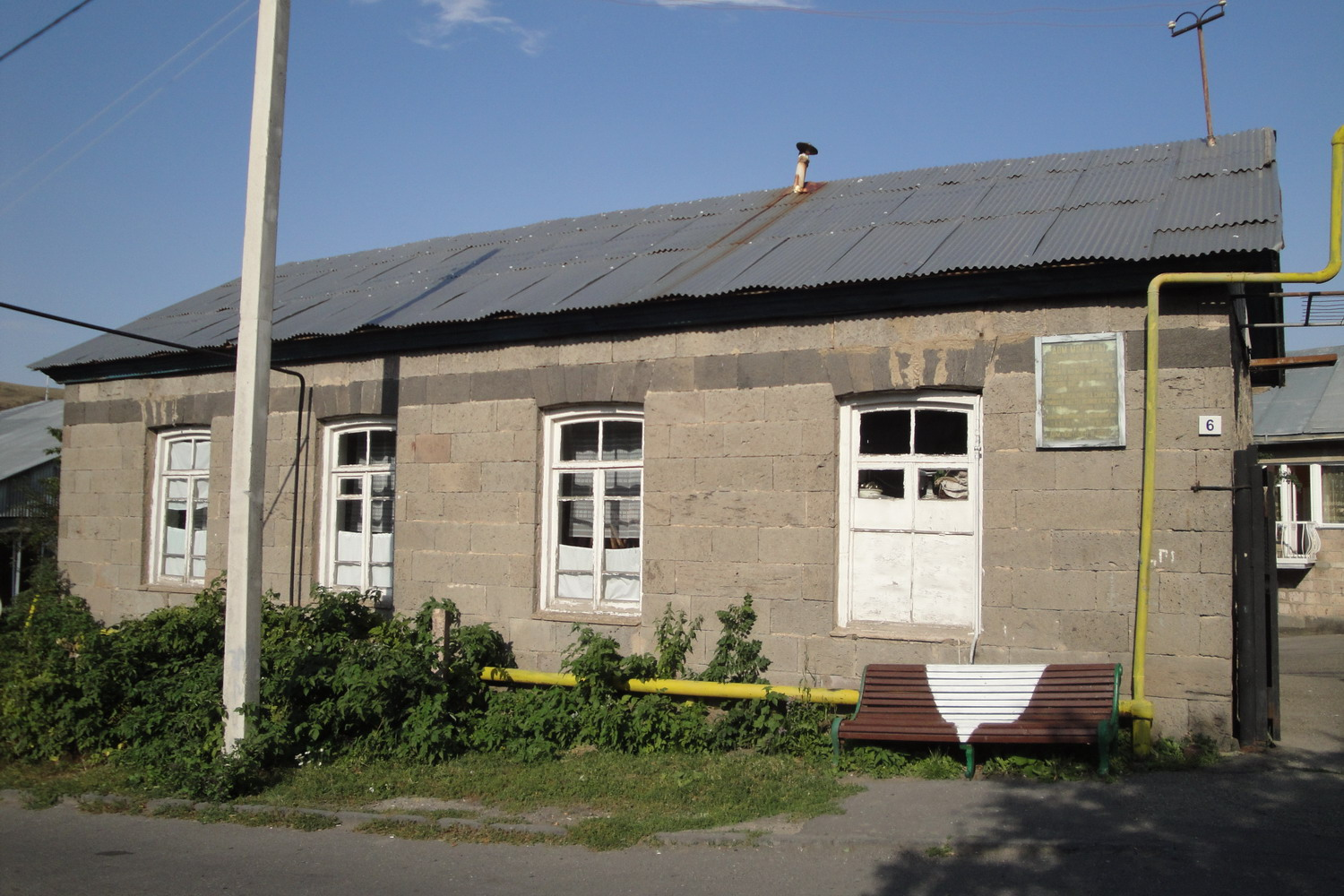
Molokan meetinghouse in Tsaghkadzor

Molokans, a Spiritual Christian group originating in Russia, have had a presence in Armenia since the 19th century. Tsarist authorities began resettling Russian sectarians to the Caucasus in 1802, and by the mid 19th century there was a significant Molokan presence in Armenia. They founded numerous villages in the Lori region, and supported the establishment of the Soviet Union in the revolutionary period. In the 20th century during collectivization, many Molokans migrated to cities. As of 2022, there are 2,000 Molokans in Armenia.

Molokans have a communal identity and practice endogamy. The Molokan community in Armenia is the most active of the Russian sectarian communities in the Caucasus.

== History ==
The Molokans, founded by Semeon Uklein, originated with the Doukhobor sect in the 18th century, and rejected the ritualism and hierarchy of the Russian Orthodox Church and the feudal system of Imperial Russia. They spread from Voronezh and Tambov to Southern Russia and the Volga region in the 19th century.

=== Tsarist settlements ===
In 1802 Tsar Alexander I ordered the resettlement of Russian sectarians to the Caucasus; regions like Lori, Lake Sevan, Dilijan, and Zangezur were chosen for their similar climate to Russia. Molokans and other sectarians were deemed particularly harmful by Nicholas I, and the goal of resettlement was to isolate them from the Orthodox Christians and to populate new areas of the Empire. Some Molokans were expelled forcefully, while others voluntarily joined Molokan settlements later. The State Council of Russia declared in 1830 that Transcaucasia would be a domain of concentrated sectarianism. In the following decades, Russian Molokans (along with Doukhobors, Khlysts, and Skoptsy) migrated in large numbers to the Caucasus. Transcaucasia was declared a viceregency and led from 1844 by Mikhail Semyonovich Vorontsov, who focused efforts on resettling Molokans in Eastern Armenia. While the Molokans were viewed as heretics by the Tsarist authorities, they perpetuated Russification policy in the Caucasus by aiding the Russian army in building hospitals, delivering supplies, and housing troops.

Molokan villages were first established in the plains of Lori under Vorontsov; the village of Vorontsovka was named after him. Vorontsovka was founded by Molokans from Orenburg and Saratov. It became a spiritual center for Molokans in the region, and in 1905 it hosted an all-Russian Molokan conference. Elenovka was founded in 1846 by exiles from Tambov and Saratov and became one of the most significant Russian settlements in the region. Other mid-19th-century Molokan settlements include the villages of Nikitino, Voskresenovka, Privolnoye, Semyonovka, Nadezhdino, and Mikhaylovka. Relations between the Molokan settlers and the Armenian locals were positive, and both groups adopted practices from the other. By 1886, there were around 7,500 Molokans in Eastern Armenia.

=== Russian Revolution and Soviet period ===
The Molokans of Armenia supported the establishment of the Soviet Union, and were active in the revolutionary movement. In the early 20th century revolutionary literature was being distributed in Molokan settlements, and an underground social-democratic organization was formed in Elenovka in 1905. Molokans met in Vorontsovka in 1917 and resolved to seize and redistribute the land.

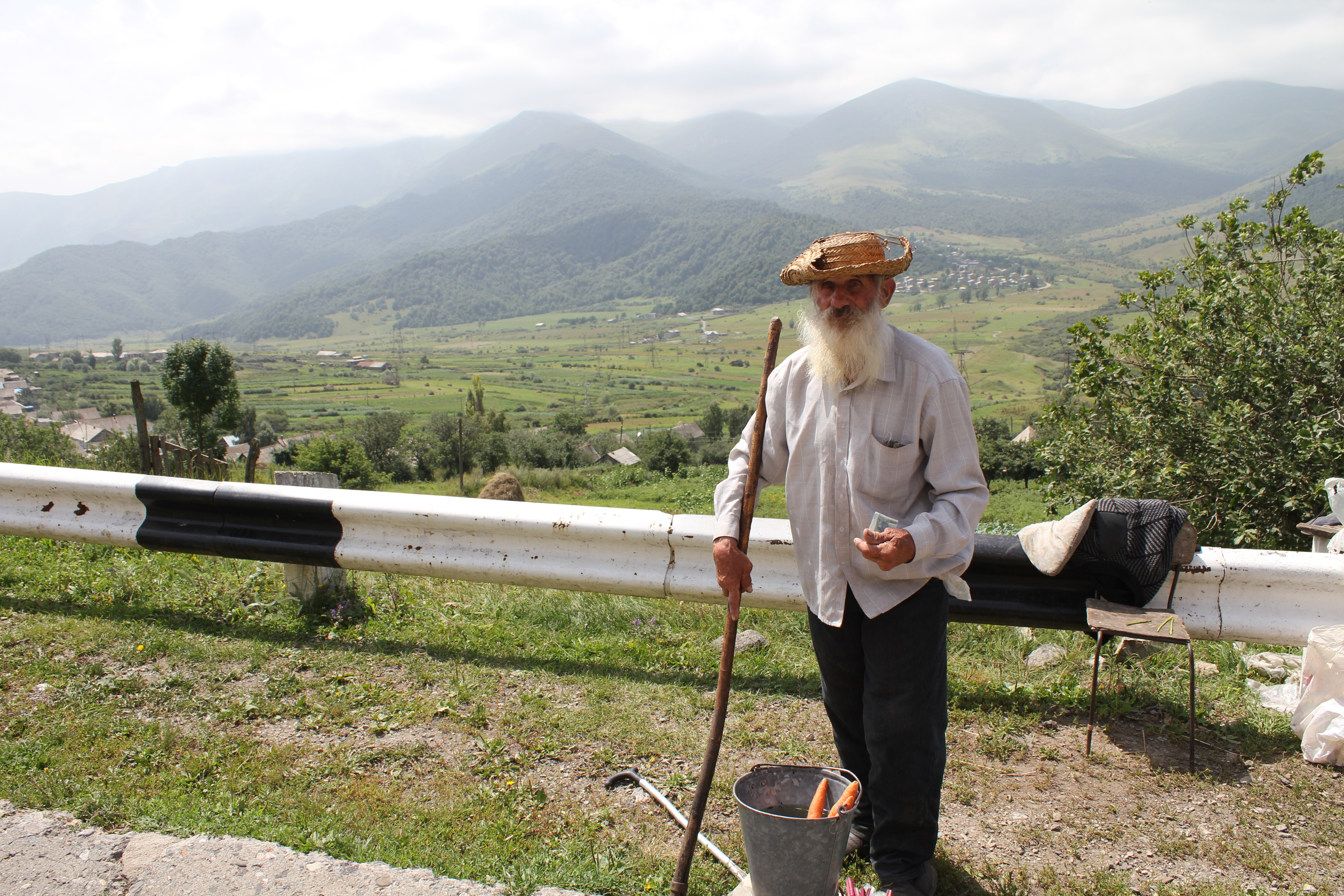
Elderly Molokan man selling carrots in Lermontovo

Land disputes between Russian and Armenian villages the 1920s caused discontentment among the Molokans, and some wanted to emigrate to Russia or Persia. Advocacy for relocating to Persia was centered in Nikitino, and representatives unsuccessfully attempted to gain permission from the Persian consulate and Soviet authorities. Eventually, the movement lost steam and the community chose to stay in Soviet Armenia.

The Soviet government began setting up collective farms in the late 1920s, and encouraged Molokans and other sectarians to leave their communes and join the new collective farms. Some resisted this program, and preferred to migrate to urban areas; in Armenia, some Molokans resentful of the Soviet government formed a schismatic group called the Maksimisty. Beginning in the 1930s, Molokans migrated in large numbers to cities.

=== Post-independence ===
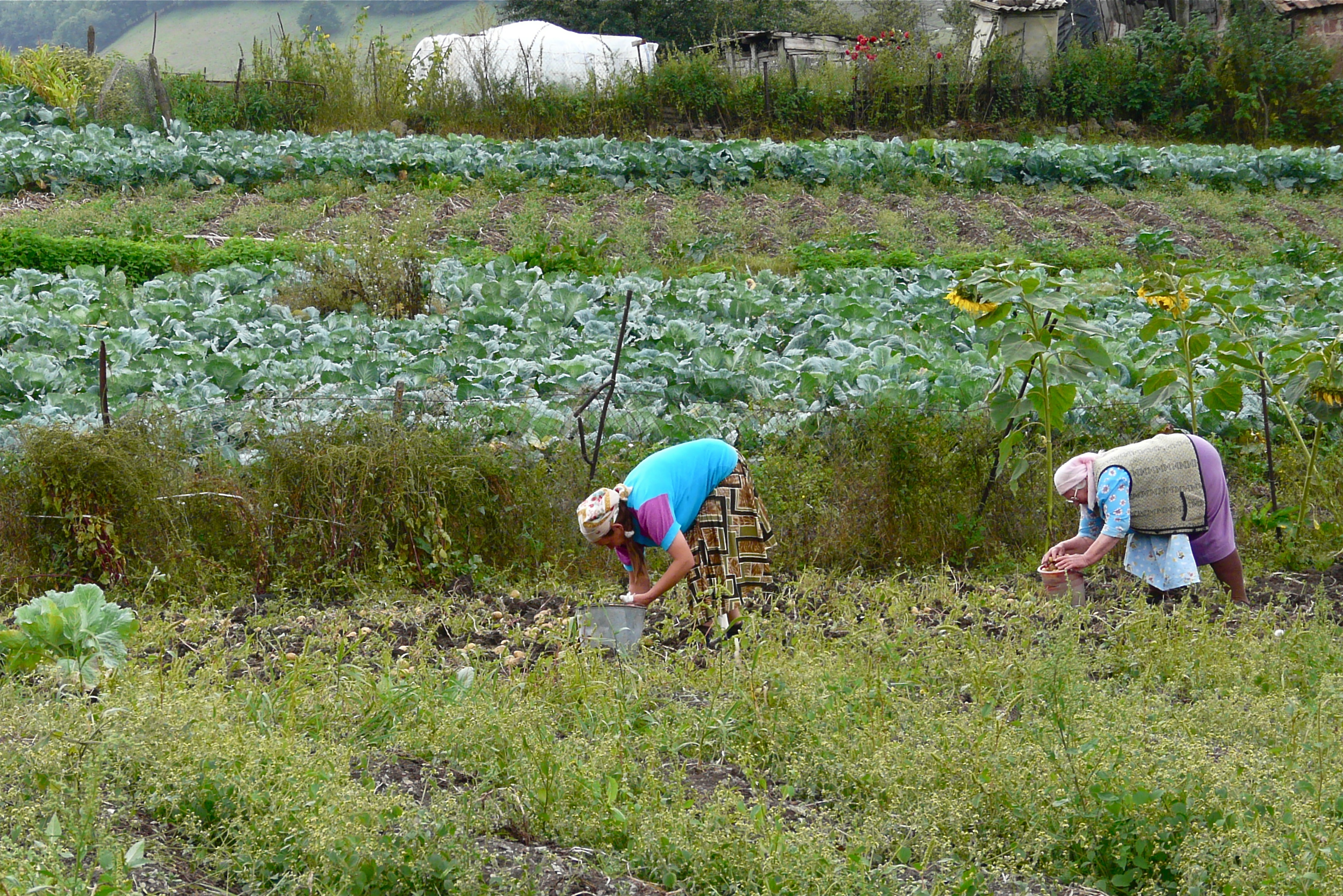
Molokan women harvesting vegetables, with a cabbage patch in the background

Cabbage is the primary product of Molokan villages; it is pickled or processed into sauerkraut. Molokan sauerkraut was popular in the Soviet Union and exported to Russia, Ukraine, and elsewhere. Since the dissolution of the USSR, Molokan cabbage and sauerkraut is only sold in Yerevan and Tbilisi. In the 21st century, Molokans have started using telephones and the internet, which were previously prohibited by elders. The 2011 Armenian census counted 2,874 Molokans and the 2022 census counted 2,000 Molokans, forming 0.1% of the population.

== Culture and beliefs ==
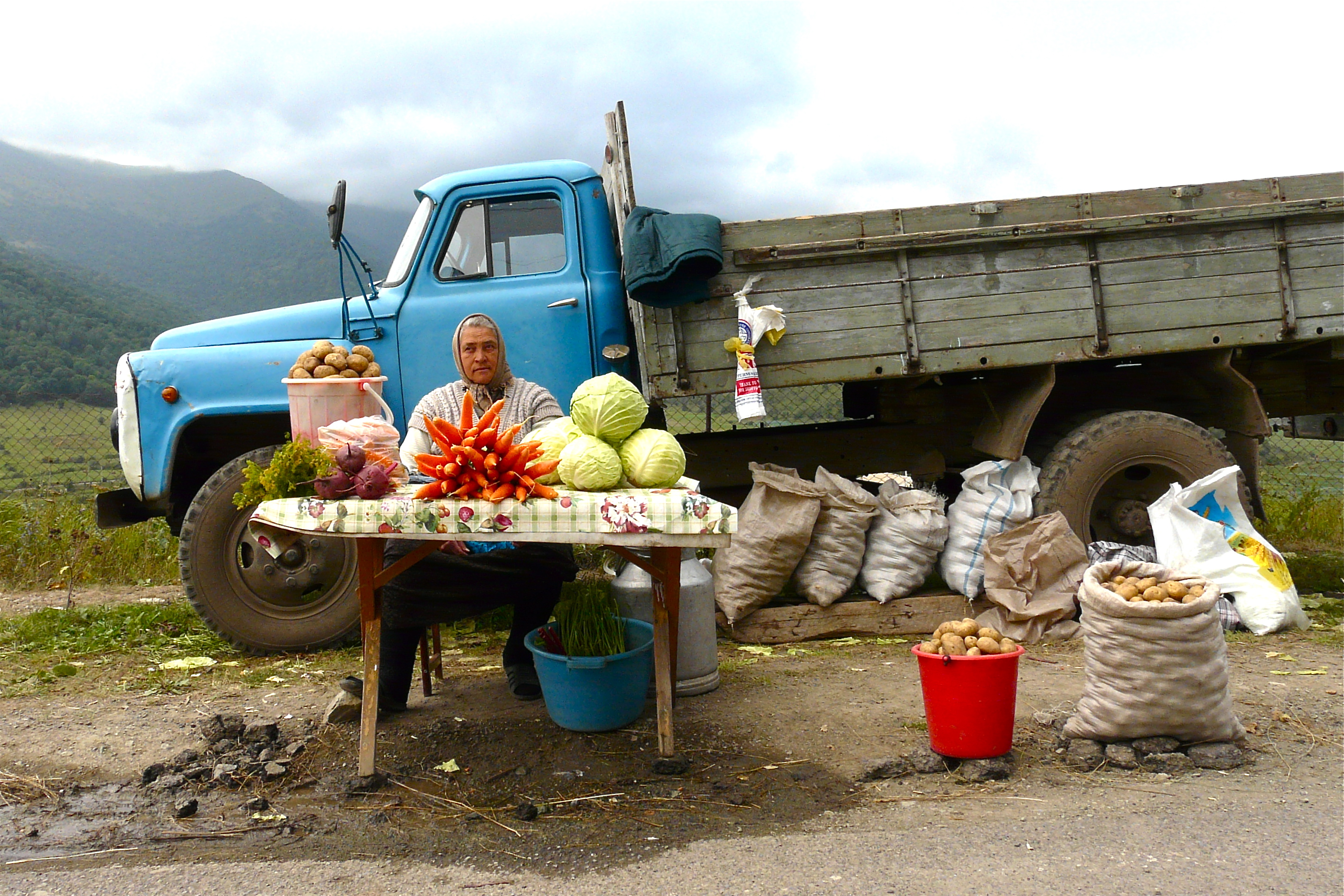
Molokan woman selling vegetables in Fioletovo

Molokans believe in the equality of all people, and reject church hierarchy and veneration of icons. They place emphasis on Lent and Easter, the latter of which is the main event in Molokan religious observance. The Bible, elders, co-religionists, and eschatological expectations are important in influencing the daily life of Molokans. The strictest Molokans refuse to celebrate secular holidays or receive pensions.

There are multiple Molokan subgroups, the primary two being the Constant Molokans and the Jumper Molokans (Russian: Pryguny). Molokan Jumpers practice ecstatic worship and are more sectarian than Constant Molokans, who follow Uklein's teachings. Most Armenian Molokans are Jumpers, as many of the Constant Molokans have emigrated, left the community, become Baptists, or become Jumpers. In Armenia there is little separation between different sects of Molokans, but members of the community identify with the level of strictness of their practice.

Molokans maintain a communal identity, and rural villages follow a traditional lifestyle. They practice strict endogamy, and view marriage to outsiders as leaving the community. Armenian Molokans are generally educated in Russian-language schools; most speak both Russian and Armenian. Molokan communities do not actively learn Armenian, which led to isolation from broader Armenian political and economic life after Armenian became the official language.

Compared to other groups of Russian religious dissidents in the Caucasus, the Molokan community in Armenia is likely the only one with youth who practice their faith actively. The Doukhobors and Subbotniks in Georgia and Azerbaijan are few in number, in large part due to emigration to Russia, Israel, the United States, and elsewhere.
