= Maxim Rudometkin =

Russian religious leader (c.1818–1877)

Maxim Gavrilovich Rudometkin (also Rudomyotkin; Russian: Максим Гаврилович Рудомёткин; c. 1818 – last seen in 1877) was the leader of one tribe of Spiritual Christian Pryguny (Russian: Прыгуны : Jumpers, Leapers) in Erivan Governorate, Imperial Russia. His followers were nicknamed Maksimisty.

His writings were first published in Los Angeles in 1915, and collectively published in 1928 with four other Spiritual Christians from Russia as a Russian religious text titled Kniga solntse, dukh i zhizn (Book of the Sun, Spirit and Life), soon placed next to the Russian Synodal Bible on the altar table of the majority of all Prygun congregations to convert them to the "new ritual" of Maksim.

== Early life ==
He was born in the village of Algasovo, Tambov Governorate, central Russia (c. 1818 – 1822). At the age of eight, according to a letter written by him to his followers, his parents forsook the Orthodox faith Russian Orthodox Church and apparently joined a Spiritual Christian Molokan (malakan) faith, which he would later oppose. Maxim Rudometkin At sometime during the years 1838 and 1842, the Rudomyotkin family moved to the South Caucasus during a period of massive resettlement of undesirable (non-Orthodox) heretics to the periphery of the Russian Empire where he played a major role in the founding of a new movement within Spiritual Christianity later called the Maksimisty. In the 1840s many of his adherents resettled among other heterodox tribes from the Molochna River area, Novorossiya (New Russia, South Ukraine) and from Central Russia to colonize the Southern Caucasus to populate this newly acquired boundary territory with ethnic Russians.

The Rudomyotkin family eventually settled in the village of Nikitino in 1842, Erivan Governorate, renamed Fioletovo in 1936, where he along with his wife, Maria Feodorovna Halopova, raised three boys, Ermolai, Alexei and Vassya. He prophesied of the apocalypse often, and as his reputation grew he was given the leadership role (presviter, presbyter) by L.P. Sokoloff. An eyewitness account reports the ceremony was performed by the laying on of hands by Sokoloff with a blessing of the Holy Spirit.

== General history ==
After his anointment by Sokoloff, Rudomyotkin then introduced through spiritual inspiration, a new form of worship which involved jumping and leaping while under the influence of the Holy Spirit during church services. This was done as a fulfillment of the prophecies of Sokoloff, who wrote that a time would come when the righteous would skip and jump like the calves and lambs of the field. Previously, his followers only experienced a form of prophecy and raising of hands during their worship services. This form of worship took place during home meetings or when working in the fields. Rudomyotkin preached a high reliance on spiritual inspiration. When his adherents would feel the Spirit come upon them, they would leap and jump in the Spirit speaking in new tongues (glossolalia) and prophesy. Rudomyotkin was a charismatic individual who traveled from village to village, preaching of repentance and of the coming 1000 year kingdom of Christ upon earth, which is written of in the book of Revelation. On December 19, 1854, he was spiritually crowned by the community through their activity of the Holy Spirit to be called the "king of spirits" (Царь Духов) and "leader of the people of Zion."

After this "spiritual coronation", he then appointed two prophets and two prophetesses to represent him in spiritual matters in the community. The prophets were named Emelian Telegin and Fitis Nazaroff, the two prophetesses were named Stenya Kartashova and Varya Manuseeva. Rudomyotkin frequently called his community the New Israel, Jumpers and Leapers (skakuny i pryguny) and the children of Zion. Spiritual Christian sects nicknamed them Maksimisty (followers of Maksim). In the year 1855, this coronation was confirmed by a young boy prophet named Efim Gerasimovich Klubnikin, who at 12 years old, prophesied concerning the spiritual kingship of Rudomyotkin among his followers. The pryguny (Jumper) label regarding this group of Spiritual Christians was first used in Orthodox print about 1856 to describe them. This spiritual preaching and activity reached its peak into 1858, in which, according to certain files, close to half of the sectarians in Transcaucasia accepted and acknowledged Rudomyotkin as "king of spirits and leader of Zion." On August 25 of 1858, his followers erected a large banner on the road into their village, declaring the end of the tsarist regime and the soon coming establishment of Christ's kingdom upon earth. This banner was seen by local authorities and also by the two grand dukes, Michael Nikolaevich and Nicholas Nicolaievich the elder, during a visit of theirs to the area. The banner was quickly confiscated by the authorities and it was later reported to higher officials that the followers of Rudomyotkin, due to his teachings, were beginning to pose a political and religious threat in the area against the authority-ship of the Tsar and the official religion of his regime. Which was the state religion of Eastern Orthodoxy.

With this new information, the local authorities decided to go to the source and arrest Rudomyotkin on the following counts: Violation of government, violation of the general public, violation of citizenship, violation of family and violation of religion. Upon arrest, they sent him to a prison in Alexandropol on September 12, 1858, and on October 29, 1858, the local governor requested the Holy Synod to send him to the Solovetsky Monastery correction facility. This request was granted on December 25, 1858, and in March 1859, he was then sentenced to walk in shackles from Tbilisi (Tiflis) (where he was later awaiting sentencing) to Solovki until he later reached the Solovetsky Monastery the following year on April 30, 1860. After sitting incarcerated for 9 years and 9 days, through the intercession of Count Dmitry Tolstoy the minister of Internal Affairs, due to inhuman treatment and not finding any fault in him, Rudomyotkin was then transferred to a more humane monastery prison in Suzdal, Central Russia, the Monastery of Saint Euthymius (also: Spaso-Evfimiev Monastery). He arrived there on May 27, 1869. In this prison, he sat for 8 more years until on May 13, 1877, as reported by the arch-priest, he died of an epileptic seizure. When this information was received by his congregants in Nikitino, they sent an elder of their church (Vassily V. Morozov) and Rudomyotkin's eldest son, Ermolai M. Rudomyotkin, to inquire further. On their arrival, they were not shown enough proof in their opinion to ascertain Rudomyotkin's death. They said on their arrival back to their home village of Nikitino, that the prison guard told them that they seek the living amongst the dead. Many of Rudomyotkin's followers to this day believe that he never died and will return at the end of the age.

== Modern history ==
Before the Russian Revolution (1904–1912) a variety of Spiritual Christians fled to Los Angeles, diverted from following Doukhobors to Canada by Peter Demens, most for economic reasons and some inspired by the prophecies of Rudomyotkin and by the boy prophet Efim Gerasemovich Klubnikin.

Rudomyotkin, while he spent 19 years in monastic correction facilities, wrote many small booklets on tea paper about 4 × 3½ in size. These booklets were then smuggled out of the monastery to his followers. Before the migration to America, a prayer book was published in 1906, which contained some of the songs and prayers of Rudomyotkin, this is the first time any of his writings were put into a book form. Members of his family brought his booklets with them on their journey to America and held them in high regard and soon thereafter were put to print. These writings were compiled in an incomplete form in a book titled the "Morning Star" by a group of his followers who were settled in Arizona in 1915 where a few of his sister's descendants resided. At the same time in Los Angeles, Ivan Gureyevich Samarin, also published a similar version of the Morning Star in his own work titled "Spirit and Life". More manuscripts were submitted from the writings of Sokoloff, Efim G. Klubnikin, and Feodor Osipovich Bulghakov (pen name: David Yesseyevich. A final version was enhanced and edited by Ivan G. Samarin, and published in 1928 as a 758-page collection titled, Книга Солнца, Дух и Жизнь (Kniga solntse, dukh i zhizn, Book of the Sun, Spirit and Life).

A variety of tribal followers of Rudomyotkin persist into the 2020s. Independent congregations are located on the Pacific Coast of the United States (about 15 congregations in Southern California and Oregon), in the Former Soviet Union in the North Caucasus (about 30 congregations in Stavropol krai and Krasnodar krai), in the Southern Caucasus about 15 congregations in Armenia, and about 7 congregations in Australia (5 in South Australia, and 2 in West Australia). None of these approximately 70 total congregations are members of or associated with the international organization of Spiritual Christian Molokane in Kochubeyevskoye, Russia, nor with any other Spiritual Christian congregation.

Dukh-i-zhizniki is a unique scientific Russian label to describe the variety of congregations who must the book Kniga solntse, dukh i zhizn as a third testament to the Russian Synodal Bible. The most zealous believers in Rudomyotkin's return with Christ are called Maksimisty.

== See also ==
- Spiritual Christianity
