= Rudometkin =

Rudometkin is a surname coming from Russian Рудомёткин, Rudomyotkin. Notable people with the surname include:

- John Rudometkin (1940–2015), American basketball player
- Maxim Rudometkin (c. 1818–1877), presbyter of the sect of Spiritual Christian Molokan Jumpers
