= Lermontovo, Armenia =

Lermontovo Լերմոնտովո
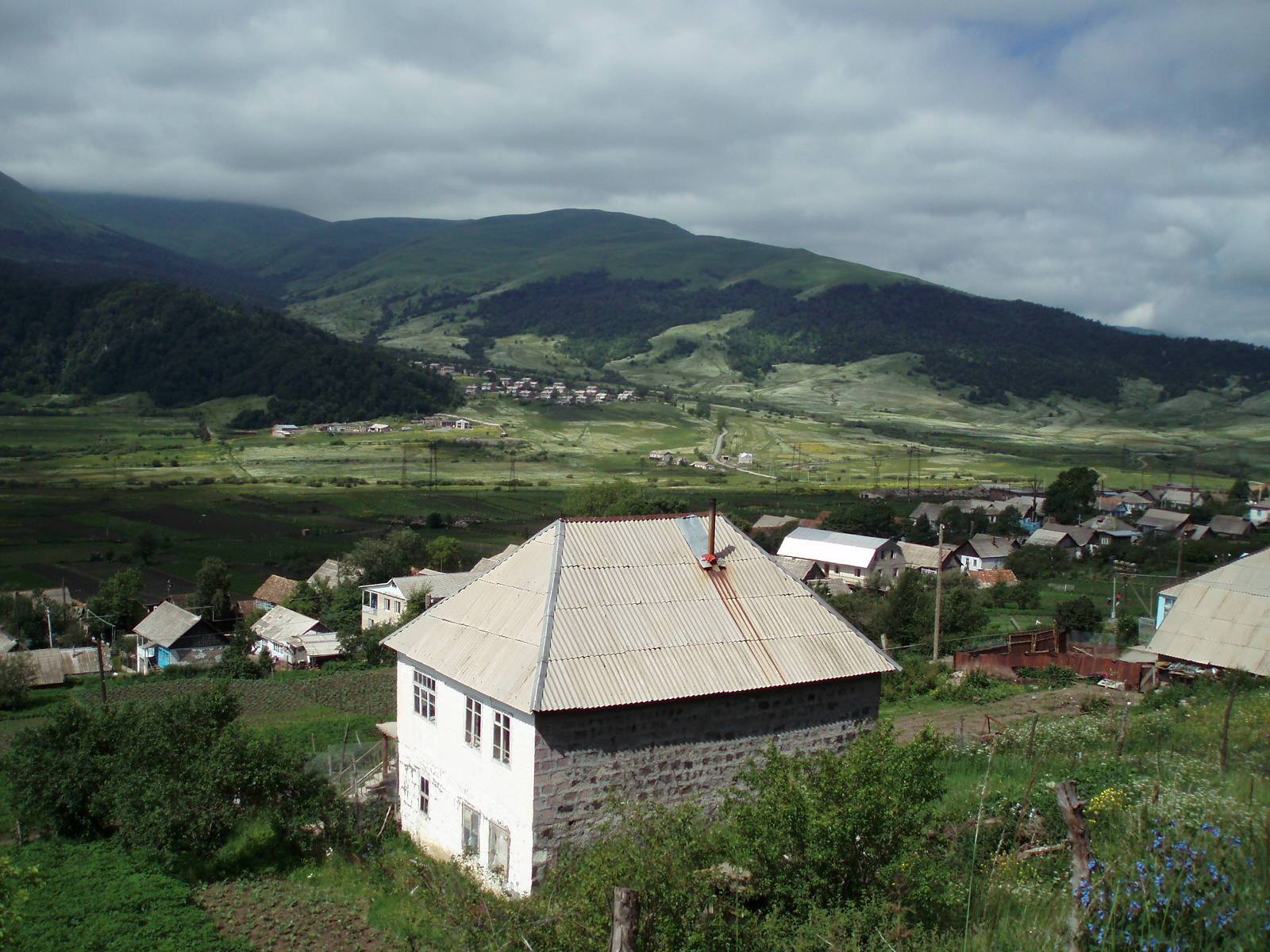

- Location within Armenia
- Coordinates: 40°45′54″N 44°37′48″E
- Country: Armenia
- Province: Lori
- Elevation: 1,825 m (5,988 ft)

Population (2011)
  - Total: 912
- Time zone: UTC+4 (AMT)

Lermontovo (Armenian: Լերմոնտովո) is a village in the Lori Province of Armenia.

== Toponymy ==
The village is named after Russian poet Mikhail Lermontov, often called "the poet of the Caucasus". The village was previously known as Voskresenovka (Armenian: Վոսկրեսենովկա).

== History ==
Like the neighboring village of Fioletovo, Lermontovo was settled in the mid-1800s by Spiritual Christians from Russia (Pryguny, Molokane).

== Gallery ==
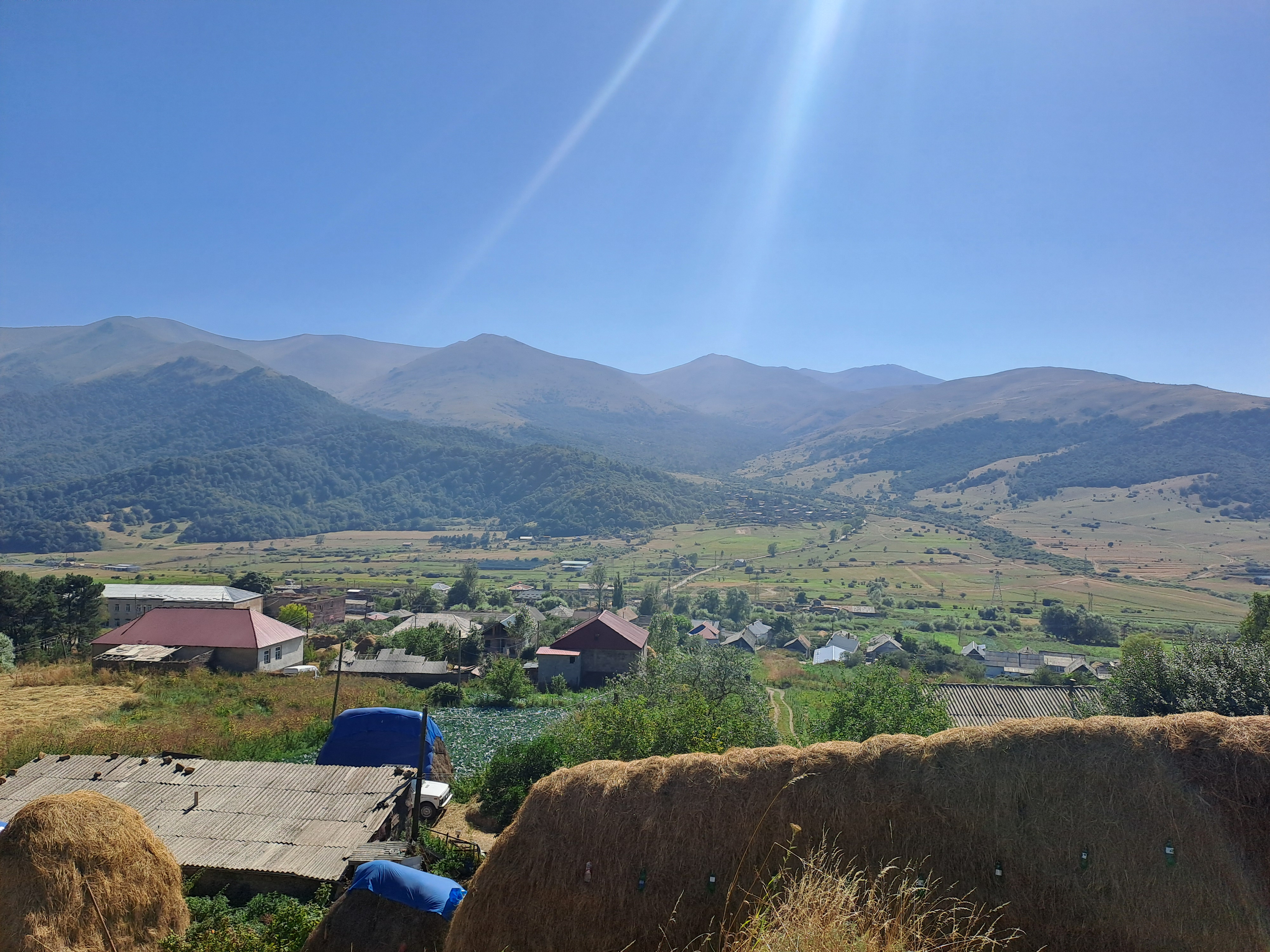
Lermontovo surrounded by the Margahovit sanctuary

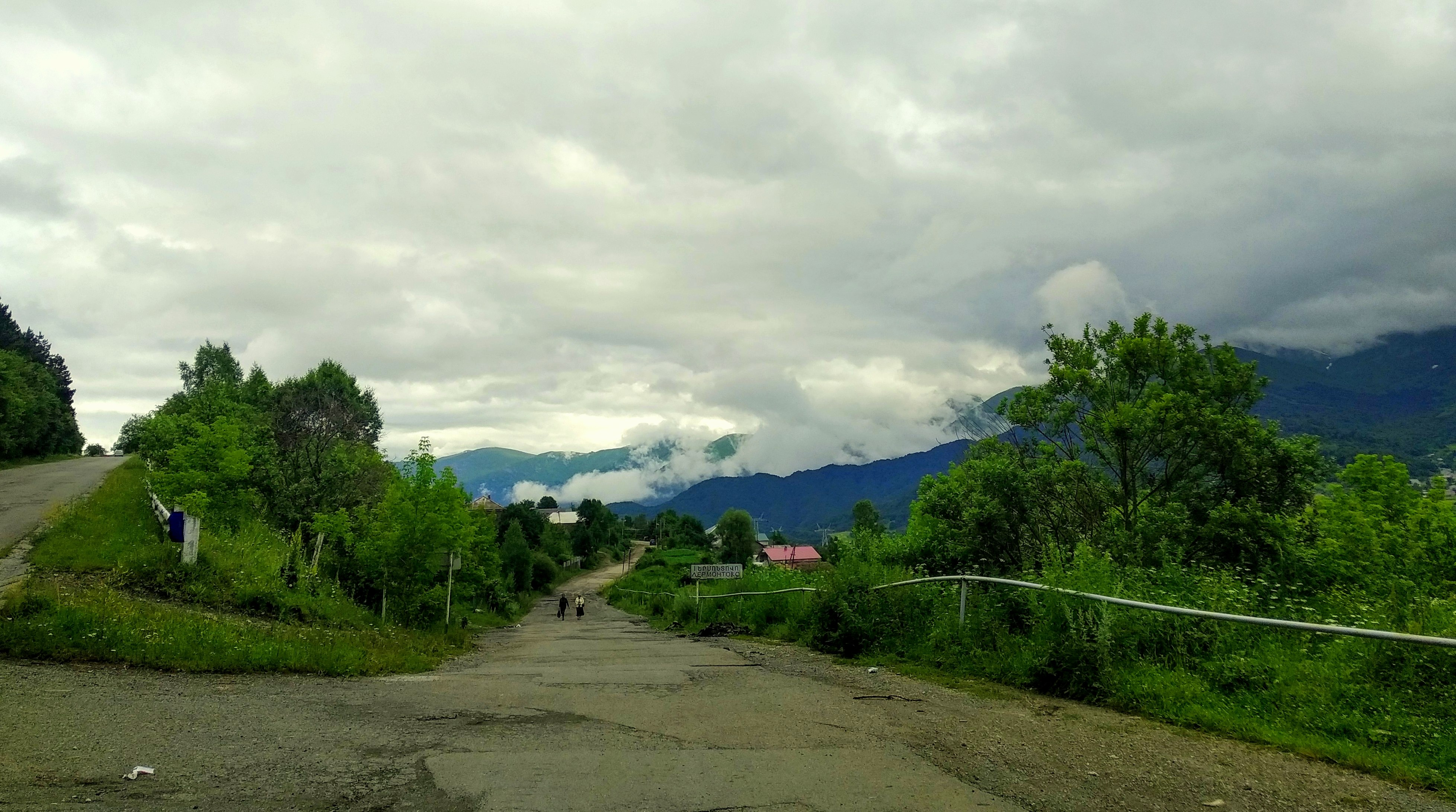
View from the village

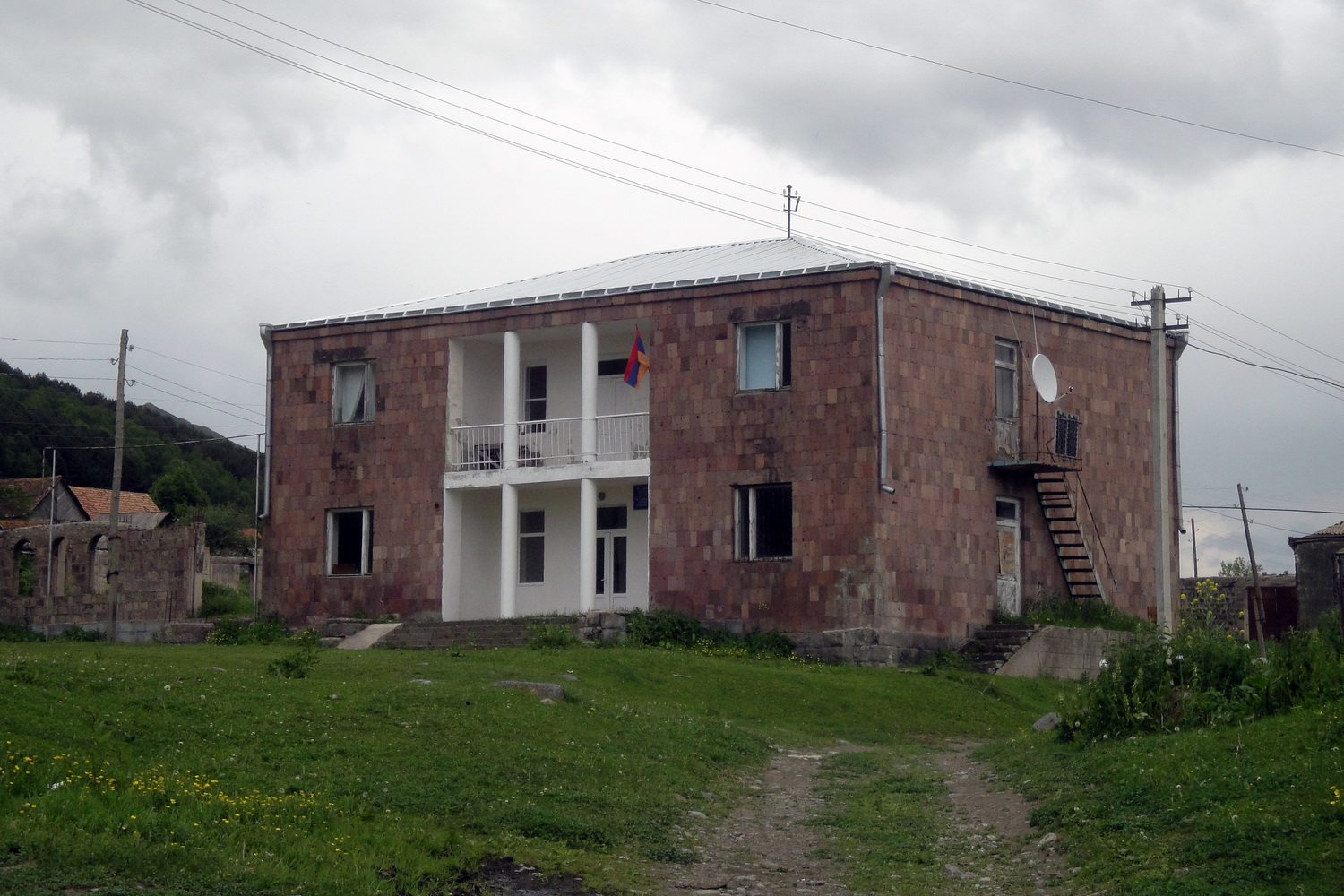
The community centre

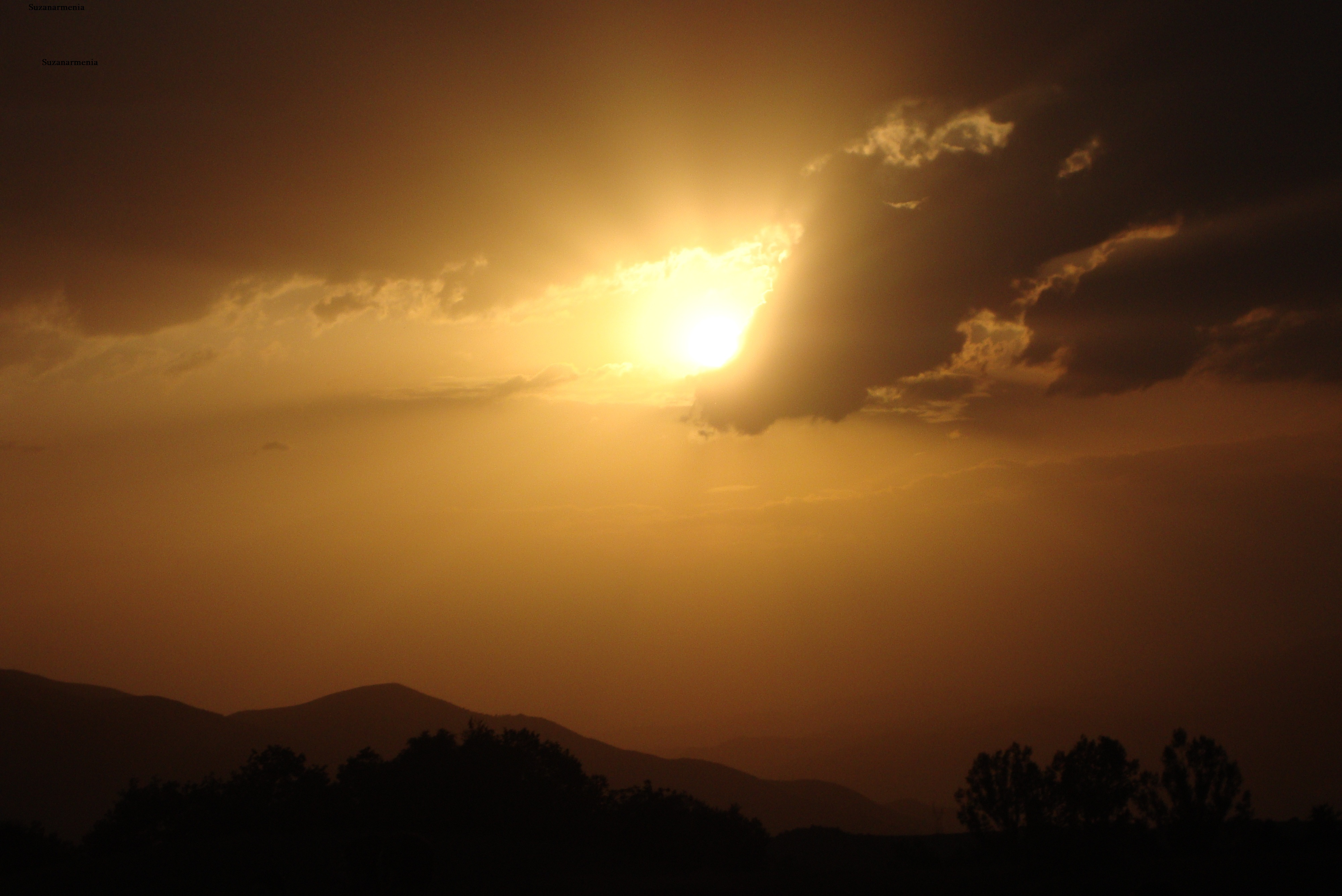
Sunset in Lermontovo

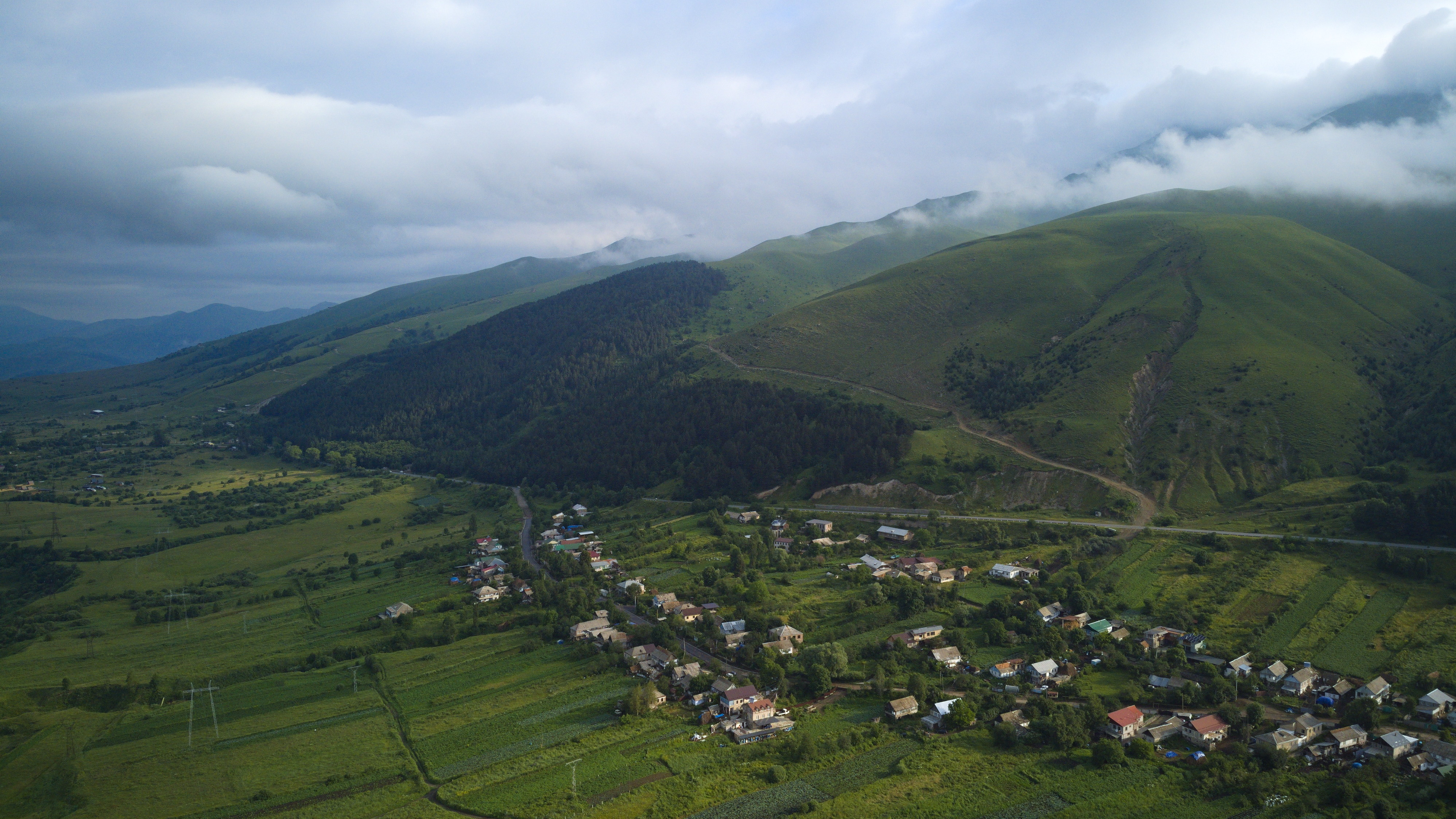
Lermontovo-Fioletovo Highway

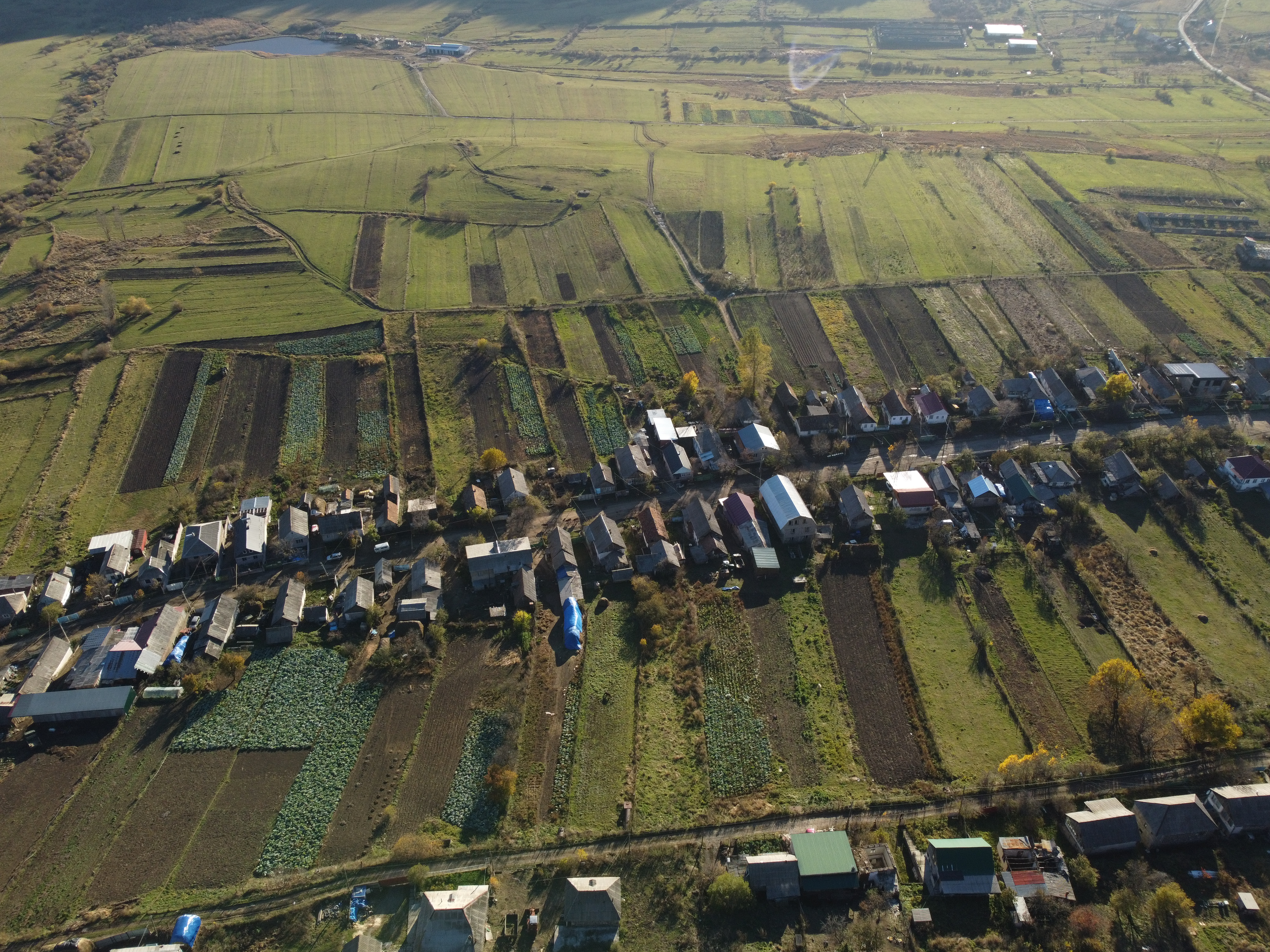
Aerial view
