= Old Israel =

Old Israel may refer to:

- the history of ancient Israel and Judah
- Staroizrail, a sect of 19th century Russian Spiritual Christianity
