= Khlysts =

Russian Orthodox underground Spiritual Christian sect

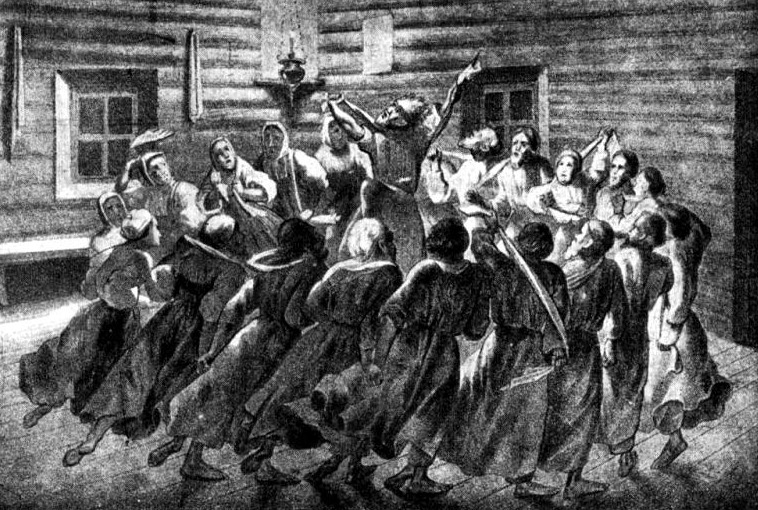
Illustration of the radenie (ecstatic ritual) of the Khlysts

The Khlysts or Khlysty (Russian: Хлысты, IPA: [xlɨˈstɨ], lit. "whips") were an underground Spiritual Christian sect which emerged in Russia in the 17th century.

The sect is traditionally said to have been founded in 1645 by Danilo Filippovich, although there is no written evidence to support this claim. The beliefs and practices of its members included ecstatic rituals, worship of charismatic leaders, and a rejection of the priesthood and holy books. They believed in direct communication with the Holy Spirit and practiced the ritual of radenie (literally, "rejoicing"), which was characterized by dancing, speaking in tongues, and prophesying.

Throughout their history, the Khlysts were pursued by accusations of sexual immorality and faced persecution from other religious groups and from the government. In the 18th century, doctrinal changes led to schisms, and by the 1970s, only a few isolated groups remained. The Khlysts had a significant influence on other Russian sectarian movements, such as the Skoptsy, Dukhobors and Molokans. Russian mystic Grigori Rasputin was associated with the Khlysts in popular rumor, but the consensus among historians is that he was not a member of the sect.

== Name ==
The members of the sect referred to themselves by various names, including "Christ-faith Believers" (Khristovovery), "Christ's people" (khristovtsy), "God's People" (liudi bozhʹi) or simply "Christs" (Khristy). The appellation Khlysty (sing. Khlyst) is a derogatory term applied by critics of the sect. The origin of the term is disputed. It is probably a corruption of the group's aforementioned self-designation of khristovtsy, but may also allude to the sect's reported practice of ritual self-flagellation; the Russian word khlyst means a "whip" or "thin rod". It is also possible that the word is related to the Greek word khiliaste (meaning "chiliast" or "millennialist"). In Russian, the sect or faith as a whole is also referred to by the nouns Khristovshchina ("the Christ faith") and Khlystovshchina.

== Origins ==
According to its own oral tradition, the sect was founded in 1645 by Danilo Filippov (or Daniil Filippovich), a peasant of Kostroma and a runaway soldier. He was said to have become a "living god" after the Lord of Hosts descended upon him on Gorodino Hill, Vladimir Oblast. He delivered twelve commandments to his disciples, which forbade (among other things) sexual intercourse, drinking and swearing. He later named as his successor Ivan Suslov, a peasant of Murom. Suslov, transformed by Filippov into a "new Christ", acquired a following of twelve apostles, along with a woman who was given the title of "Mother of God". The tradition relates that Suslov was crucified twice by the Russian authorities, but rose from the dead each time.

There is no written evidence to support this story, or to confirm the existence of Filippov. The first historical references to the Khlysts are found in the writings of the Old Believers, a Christian community which resisted the 17th-century reforms of the Russian Orthodox Church. The Old Believers condemned the Khlysts as heretics, and warnings about them can be found in letters dating from around the 1670s. The Orthodox Church also attacked the Khlysts; Dimitry of Rostov wrote against them in An Investigation of the Schismatic Faith (c. 1709).

Suslov died around 1716, at which time Prokofii Lupkin became the new "Christ". The oral tradition claims that Lupkin was the son of Filippov, but this is unlikely to be true.

Lupkin was a trader, and made use of his frequent journeys to places such as Uglich and Venev to organise secret assemblies for his followers. He encouraged his followers to worship in the manner of the Old Believers, such as by making the sign of the cross with two fingers instead of three, but he also instructed them to attend the State Church and take communion. Many Khlysts, including Lupkin's wife and son, even took monastic vows. Lupkin also made large donations to the Church, which helped to protect the sect from persecution.

== Beliefs and practices ==
The Khlysts believed that Jesus was an ordinary man until his baptism at the age of thirty, after which the Spirit of God descended on him, making him Christ. They did not believe in the literal virgin birth of Jesus. They believed that Jesus' body remained in its grave after his death, and that "the Resurrection really means that the Divine Spirit which had constituted him a Christ was bequeathed by him to successors worthy thereof." The Khlysts believed that the incarnation of God in Jesus was the filling of Jesus with the Spirit of God, and that this was only the first of several such instances. They did not distinguish between Christ the Son and the Holy Spirit. Thus, the Khlysts have been described as "essentially a pre-Trinitarian sect, though in their hymns we meet with tags of Trinitarianism borrowed from the Orthodox Church."

The Khlysts renounced priesthood, holy books and veneration of the saints (excluding the Theotokos). They believed in the possibility of direct communication with the Holy Spirit and of its embodiment in living people. Each congregation (called a korabl "ship") had its own "Christ" and "Mother of God", appointed by the overall leader of the sect. Furthermore, they believed that the Holy Spirit could descend upon any one of them during the state of ecstasy which they attained during the ritual of radenie (literally, "rejoicing"). However, they believed in levels of holiness; not all were equally endowed with the Spirit of God. They viewed Danila Filippov as an incarnation of God of Sabaoth and thus having preeminence over the other Christs and Mothers of God of the sect.

This ritual of radenie, which formed the focus of their worship, took place on holy feast days. The congregation would gather during the evening at a prearranged location, such as a member's house. They would remove their outer clothing, and enter the sacred space dressed only in an undershirt. After a period of singing or chanting the Jesus Prayer ("Lord Jesus Christ, Son of God, have mercy on me, a sinner"), some of the worshippers would feel the Holy Spirit come upon them, and would begin dancing wildly, prophesying in unintelligible language. This would continue for half an hour or more, until the dancers collapsed with exhaustion. Finally, they would share a sacramental meal of nuts, bread, pastry and kvass.

The Khlysts practiced an extreme asceticism, in order to prepare themselves for the reception of the Holy Spirit into their bodies. They abstained from alcohol, and often fasted for days or weeks at a time. Although marriage was permitted for practical purposes, "because the help of a wife was indispensable for a peasant", it was a sin to engage in sexual intercourse, even with one's own wife. Connected with this mortification of the flesh was the practice of self-flagellation which often accompanied the radenie rite.

Russian author Edvard Radzinsky has described a radenie ritual which he witnessed on the island of Chechen in 1964:

In white flaxen shirts worn over naked bodies they went down into the cellar of a peasant lodge. There in the dry cellar they lit candles. They started to sing something sacred in the half-light – as was later explained, a verse from the Easter canon: "Seeing, we are gladdened, for Christ has risen." After that a little old man with joyful, light-coloured eyes – the local Christ – began to chant a Khlyst prayer in the flickering candlelight. And then with youthful energy he started to "rejoice", that is, to whirl wildly in place, crossing himself and continually whipping his body. The choir chanted prayers, their voices ever more savagely, ever more fervently and passionately praying, so that some of them were already screaming and sobbing. But at this point the old man stopped in his whirling and cried out wildly, "Brothers! Brothers! I feel it, the Holy Spirit! God is within me!" And he began to prophesy, shouting out incoherent sounds mixed into which were the words, "Oh, Spirit!" "Oh, God!" "Oh, Spirit Lord!" After that began the main communal rite of "rejoicing", or general whirling and dancing.

Radzinsky says that they referred to the whirling dance as "spiritual beer", on account of its intoxicating effect. He reports that after the dance had continued for some time, the worshippers fell to the floor: "And that was the end of it. But apparently only because I was present." Radzinsky claims that in some arks, the Khlysts would at this point engage in "group sinning" – a frenzied sexual orgy, which they believed would purify them from the lusts of the flesh. Similarly, C. L. Sulzberger, in his book The Fall of Eagles, writes that the Khlysts' "foremost idea was that salvation could be attained only by total repentance and that this became far more achievable for one who had truly transgressed. 'Sin in order that you may obtain forgiveness,' was the practical side of the Khlysty."

Other scholars have dismissed these rumours. Frederick Cornwallis Conybeare, referencing a study by Karl Konrad Grass, writes:

[The Khlysty] have been accused of ending their radenia or religious dances with wholesale debauchery, the lights being first put out. Grass examines the evidence very carefully and impartially, and rejects the story as calumny. The only thing that gives it colour is that often, when the ecstasies are over, the exhausted votaries drop down on the floor and sleep till dawn, the men on one side of the apartment, the women on the other. Their doing so, instead of going home at once, is a necessity dictated either by the climate or by fear of the Russian police, whose suspicions would be roused if they trooped home at a late hour.

Historian Joseph T. Fuhrmann claims that "splinter groups practiced 'holy intercourse,' but most khlysty were devout pentecostalists who condemned such behaviour." According to one view, the emergence of the Skoptsy—a breakaway sect from the Khlysts which practiced self-castration—reflected an impulse to preclude the possibility of sexual relations between Khlysts, which may have occurred occasionally after ecstatic dances or between male Khlysts and their "spiritual sisters" (the women who acted as their wives but together with whom they were supposed to maintain celibacy). One of the earliest Skoptsy preachers testified that he and his comrades turned to castration as the only way to maintain the celibacy demanded by the Khlysts. (Note: A quotation from the record of the first investigation into the Skoptsy reads: "Their faith most firmly confirmed that no one should have carnal intercourse with women, considering it the gravest sin, but since human flesh, despite this prohibition, sometimes forced one to seek the female sex, which could not be avoided even by the most brutal [self-]flagellation, he, Blokhin, reasoned together with the homesteader Yevsey Gnevushev and the runaway peasant Kondraty Nikiforov that one can escape that sin only through castration, citing as an example cattle, which after treatment no longer commit fornication…".)

== Persecution ==
Accusations of sexual immorality pursued the sect from its earliest days, and provoked numerous government investigations.

In 1717, Lupkin and twenty other Khlysts were arrested in Uglich. They were held for five months, during which time they were interrogated and beaten. While some of his followers remained in custody, Lupkin managed to negotiate his own release, with the help of a 300-ruble bribe. Despite officially repenting, he continued to lead the movement until his death in 1732.

From 1733 to 1739, a specially-formed government commission arrested hundreds of suspected Khlyst members, charging them with participation in sexual orgies and ritual infanticide. These accusations were repeatedly denied, but the commission nevertheless convicted over three hundred people. They handed out sentences of hard labour, beatings, and mutilation of the nostrils and the tongue, and sent many of the prisoners into exile in Siberia or Orenburg.

However, the Khlysty were undeterred, and continued practising. Some of those who had been sent into exile began to spread the movement through Siberia. In 1745, therefore, a new commission was formed, this time using "far crueler methods of interrogation". This commission, although eliciting false confessions of sexual deviation and cannibalistic communion, and sending another 200 people into exile, likewise failed to stamp out the movement.

== Later history ==
Around 1750, some doctrinal changes took place within the sect, and they became known as the Postniki ("Fasters"). The leaders of the sect were now seen as "personifications of Christ", rather than only playing host to his spirit. It was no longer considered possible for ordinary members to receive the Holy Spirit during radenie, although the ritual still held a central position in their worship.

In 1840, a new splinter sect broke away from the Postniki. Calling themselves Israelites, they shortly afterwards split again into Old Israel and New Israel. The beliefs of the latter group departed considerably from the traditional teachings of the Khlysts, and the sect still exists today in Uruguay.

These schisms weakened the movement, and their numbers began to decline. By the start of the twentieth century, estimates of the Khlysts' numbers ranged at around one hundred thousand. Prior to the outbreak of World War I, there were reported to be around 20,000 New Israelites, 15,000 Old Israelites and 3,000 Postniki in Russia. By the 1970s, there were only "a few isolated groups" remaining.

== Influence ==
The Khlysts are said to have been "the root of all Russian sectarianism", having spawned sects such as the Skoptsy, the Dukhobors and the Molokans.

=== Connection to Rasputin ===
Grigori Rasputin was twice investigated (in 1903 and 1907) by the Tobolsk Theological Consistory, under charges of spreading Khlyst doctrine. Both investigations were closed without any evidence being found against him, but popular rumour continued to link Rasputin to the sect. C. L. Sulzberger, in 1977, claimed that Rasputin "adopted the philosophy (if not proven membership)" of the Khlysts. In The Man Behind the Myth, co-authored by Rasputin's daughter Maria, it is claimed that Rasputin attended several Khlyst gatherings in the years before his arrival in Saint Petersberg, but ultimately became disillusioned with the sect. The factual accuracy of this book has been called into question, and according to Brian Moynahan, Maria's story is the only evidence that Rasputin had any Khlyst connections. The consensus of modern historians is that Rasputin was never a member of the sect.

== See also ==
- Frankism
- Kartanolaisuus, Finnish cult with influences from Khlysts and Skoptsys
- The Silver Dove, Andrei Bely's first novel (1909), is based on the Khlysts
- Spiritual Christians
