= Spiritual Christianity =

Russian religious movement, non-Orthodox

Spiritual Christianity (Russian: духовное христианство, romanized: dukhovnoye khristianstvo) is the group of belief systems held by so-called heterodox ethnic Russians, folk Protestants (narodnye protestanty), including non–Eastern Orthodox indigenous faith tribes and new religious movements that emerged in the Russian Empire. Their origins are varied: some come from Protestant movements imported from Europe to Russia by missionaries, travelers and workers; others from dissatisfaction with the perceived misbehavior (absenteeism, alcoholism, profiteering) of Orthodox priests, still others from the Bezpopovtsy Raskolniks. Those influences, mixed with indigenous folk traditions, resulted in communities of heretics that are collectively called sektanty (сектанты : sectarians). Such communities were typically documented by Russian Orthodox clergy with a label that described their heresy such as not fasting, meeting on Saturday (sabbatarians), rejecting the spirit (spirit wrestlers), body mutilation (castigators), self-flagellation, or suicide.

The historian Pavel Milyukov traced the origins of Spiritual Christianity to the Doukhobors (if Khlysts are not included), who were first recorded in the 1800s but originated earlier. Milyukov believed the movement reflected developments among Russian peasants similar to those underlying the German Peasants' War in the German Reformation of the 1500s. Many Spiritual Christians embraced egalitarian and pacifist beliefs, which were considered politically radical views by the Russian government. It deported some groups to internal exile in Central Asia. About one percent escaped suppression by emigrating (1898–1930s) to North America forming a diaspora that divided into many sub-groups.

These heterodox (non-orthodox) groups "rejected ritual and outward observances and believe instead in the direct revelation of God to the inner man". Adherents are called Spiritual Christians (Russian: духовные христиане) or, less accurately, malakan in the former Soviet Union, and "Molokans" in the United States, often confused with "Doukhobors" in Canada. Molokane proper constituted the largest and most organized of many Spiritual Christian groups in the Russian Empire.

Spiritual Christians have been compared to the European Radical Reformation. Main Spiritual Christian movements include: Khlysts, Dukhobors, Molokans, Spiritual Christian Teetotalers–Churikovites, and their subbranches.

== Branches ==
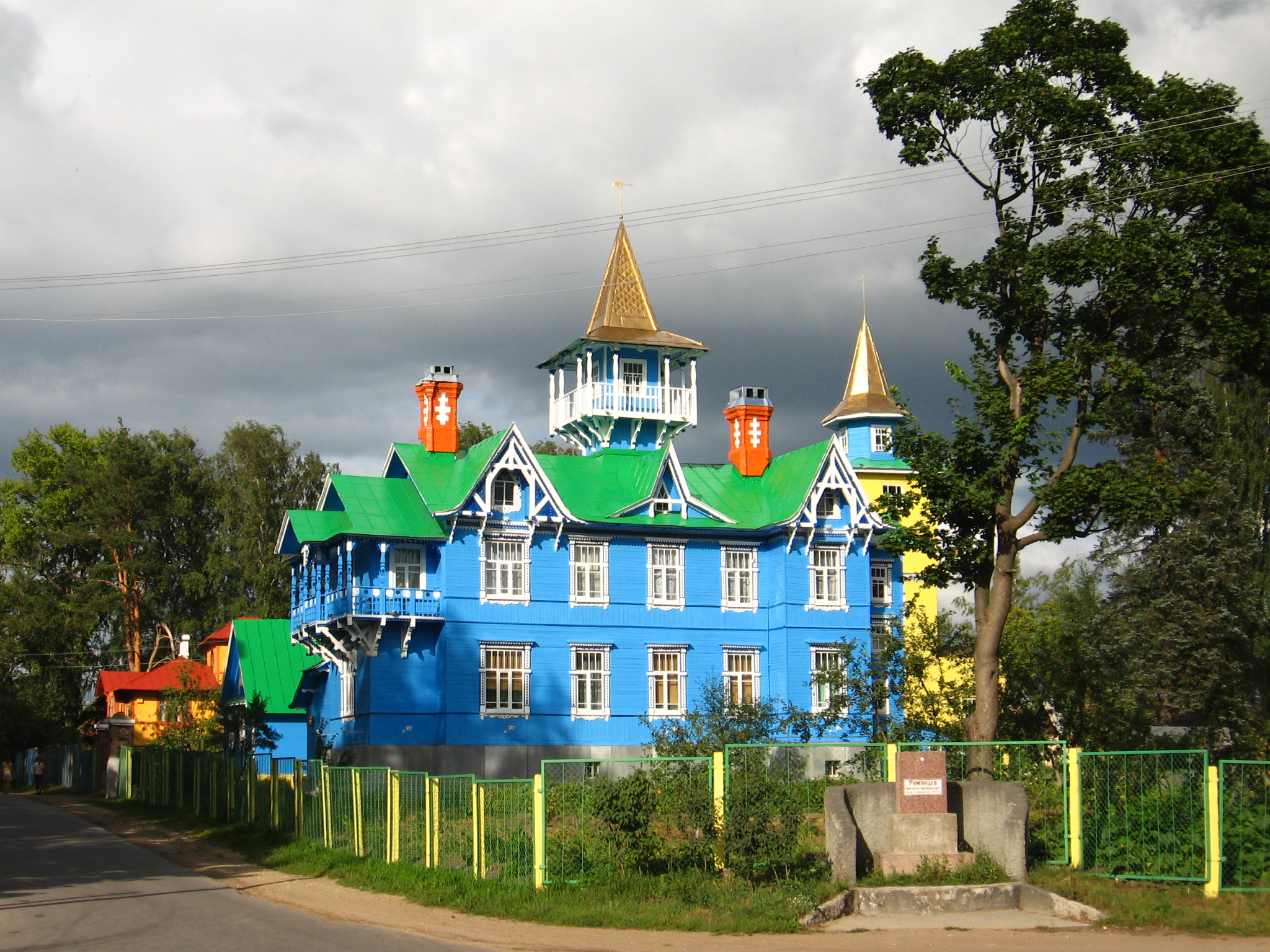
Prayer House of Spiritual Christian Teetotalers in Vyritsa, Leningrad region

Among the many sectarians (sektanty : сектанты) in Imperial Russia considered to practice Spiritual Christianity are the Khlysty, Skoptsy, Dukhobory, Maksimisty, Molokans, Pryguny (Jumpers), Ikonobortsy (Icon-fighters, "Iconoclasts"), Teetotalers–Churikovites, and Zhidovstvuyushchiye (Жидовствующие: Judaizers). These sects often have radically different notions of "spirituality" and practices. Their common denominator is that they sought God in "Spirit and Truth" (Gospel of John 4:24) rather than in the Orthodox Church or ancient rites of Old Believers. Their saying was, "The church is not within logs, but within ribs". The movement was popular with intellectuals such as Tolstoy. Nikolai Leskov was also drawn to Spiritual Christianity after visiting Protestant Europe in 1875.

Sometimes, the Yehowists, Tolstoyans, and a minor portion of the Subbotniks are classified as "Spiritual Christians."

Separate from Spiritual Christianity were other strands of Russian sektanstvo ("sectarianism" in the sense "splitting into sects" rather than "sectarian bigotry") including the Bespopovtsy (priestless Old Believers) and Shtundists and other Protestant Evangelical groups.

=== Khlysts ===
The Khlysts (whips, flagellants) or Khristovovers were a 17th-century sect that left the Russian Orthodox Church, they held extremely ascetic views, the Khlyst sect became extinct during the Soviet Union. The Khlysty imposed self denial and focused on the reception of the Holy Spirit through constant prayer, they were denounced as "Quaker heretics" and practices such as ecstatic forms of worship, rhythmic dancing, chants and celibacy resembled the practice of the Shakers. The Khlyst practices also resembled Pentecostal sects. C. L. Sulzberger, in 1977, claimed that Rasputin "adopted the philosophy (if not proven membership)" of the Khlysts.

==== Postniki ====
Postniki (fasters) were a sect that was born out of the Khlysts. They emphasized ascetism. They branched into Staroizrail and New Israel.

==== Skoptsy ====
Skoptsy (eunuchs), now extinct, originally split off from the Khlysts and had a high following in the 19th century. The sect believed that forgiveness of sin came through self mutilation, like castration. They also believed that when enough people joined them, Jesus would return. The sect was ultimately destroyed by Stalin. Some reported that the Skoptsy sect still exists in small numbers, but there is no serious proof. A few individuals still have similar beliefs in Russia.

==== Shalaputs ====
Shalaputy were a radical reform movement in Imperial Russia during 1830–1890 AD. They demanded that sinful people should not be allowed to attend Church meetings (Novatianism), and opposed the formalism of Orthodoxy. They also emphasized the Jewish roots of Christianity. The Shalaputs became an evangelical movement made up of peasants who wanted to create their own version of Christianity that opposed Russian Orthodoxy.

==== New Israel ====
New Israel came to resemble Protestantism and the Dukhobors much more than Staroizrail, the New Israel movement rejects the Orthodox religious practices and aims to "worship God in spirit and truth". Because many adherents of the movement moved to Uruguay, the movement still exists in Uruguay.

=== Doukhobors ===
Dukhobortsy were an 18th-century Spiritual Christian movement that evolved from ikonobortsy, opposed all external authorities and the literal Bible, instead being in favour of direct individual revelation. They abolished priests and sacraments, were pacifists and opposed the authority of church and state. One-third mass migrated to Canada (1899–1938), and about 15–20k Dukhobortsy still exist in Russia.

==== Sons of Freedom ====
Doukhobors are not Sons of Freedom. Soon after immigration began in 1899 to the Canadian prairies, in 1902 an anarchist zealous faction calling themselves svobodniki (free-sovereign people) separated from and attacked other Doukhobors and the Canadian government, forming a new religious movement. The svobodniki began several protest marches (treks) to return to Russia, or move to the United States. They harassed law-biding Doukhobors for not joining their anarchistic movement. By the 1920s they were called "Sons of Freedom" and "Freedomites", and were extensively confused in British Columbia with the organized Christian Community of Universal Brotherhood (CCUB: community Doukhobors) led by Peter V. Verigin, and with Independent Doukhobors in Saskatchewan who registered their own land and attended public schools. The Sons of Freedom conducted various protests (nude treks, arson, bombings, not owning land, etc.) into the 1980s. Since the 1950s, hundreds were imprisoned, and about 170 children were interned and abused in a dormitory school for which these now adult children won reparations in 2024 from the BC government.

=== Molokans ===
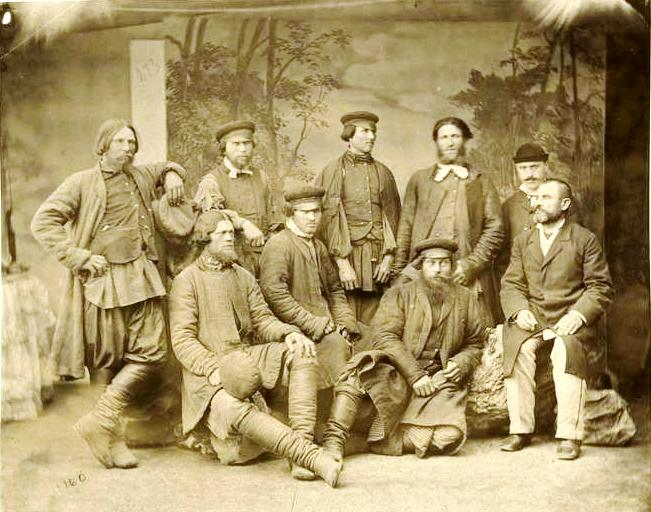
Molokan men

The Molokane are a sect that has been compared to the Radical Reformation, to the Quakers, and often confused with other Spiritual Christian faiths from Russia. They have a Protestant-like view of the authority of scripture, however interpreting the bible allegorically or "spiritually", they see the sacraments "spiritually", reject the use of icons, images of the cross and Church hierarchy along with venerating the saints. Molokane believe each has their own inner light, therefore do not need someone to "jump in the spirit" for them. In Russia, they advocated for pacifism, held home meetings, did not drink or smoke, opposed contraception and some modern technology. Many Molokans follow the Old Testament food laws, refusing to eat pork, shellfish or unclean foods. They were named for consuming dairy products (moloko: Russian for "milk") during most Orthodox fasting days. About 40,000 continue the faith in Russia, and one meeting hall continues to meet on Potrero Hill, San Francisco, since 1928. No congregations of Molokane exist in Southern California, as is often falsely claimed.

==== Mokrye Molokane ====
Mokrye Molokane are a Molokan subsect that split off from the Molokans in the year 2000, that is nearly identical to the Molokans but practice water baptism.

==== Sukhie Baptisty ====
Sukhie Baptisty was a 19th-century Spiritual Christian movement, which was born from Molokans who merged with the Russian Union of Evangelical Christians. They were called "dry baptists", because they refused to baptize believers in physical water, but instead believing in a "baptism of the spirit", insisting that baptism was a purely spiritual experience instead of a physical one. Very few dry Baptists still exist in Georgia.

==== Molokan-Adventisty ====
Molokan-Adventisty are a hybrid sect of Molokans and Seventh Day Adventists, the sect was born because of German Adventist missionaries in the 20th century.

==== Pryguny ====
The Pryguny (translation: Jumpers) were formed from several heterodox (sectarian) movements in Central Russia and Taurida Governorate, most of whom were isolated in the newly acquired South Caucasus to not infect the Orthodox. Named for their ecstatic spiritual jumping dances, these new tribes variously embraced a few essential "Christ's holidays" from Orthodoxy, "God's holidays" from the Old Testament and Subbotniks, adding new prophecies and rituals similar to Khlysty. They have some similarities to western Pentecostalism. One outspoken Prygun leader in Erivan Governorate, Maksim G. Rudomyotkin (1818–1877), formed his own Maksimist faith, which merged with the new Dukh-i-zhiznik movement formed in west rural Glendale, Arizona, and east Los Angeles county, California, in the 1930s by adherents who migrated there from 1905 through 1912.

==== Dukh-i-zhizniki ====
Dukh-i-zhizniki (Spirit and Lifers) are a Russian-American Spiritual Christian new religious movement born in America from a mixture of ecstatic Spiritual Christian faith tribes who migrated to the eastside of Los Angeles from the South Caucasus from 1904 through 1912. Some may classify Dukh-i-zhizniki as a cult due to the prominence of one spiritual leader, Maksim G. Rudomyotkin (1818–1877). Along with partially related tribes in Arizona and Southern California, the organizers debated and negotiated from 1915 to 1928 to combine their various spiritual writings and a compromised history into a contested book, which was finally titled: Kniga solntse, dukh i zhizn (Книга солнце, дух и жизнь : Book of the Sun, Spirit and Life, 1928). This Russian religious text was placed on the altar tables of all member congregations "by the Holy Spirit" as a third-testament to their Russian Synodal Bible, and uniquely defines their new family of faiths. In the 1930s the book was sent to Prygun and Maksimist congregations in Kars province, Turkey, and Soviet Armenia where it was accepted by many who interpreted it differently, divided and continue to divide.

== Similar or related movements ==
- Biblists – Jewish sect in 19th-century Russia
- Eastern Protestant – Protestants of Eastern Christendom
- Kartanoism – Finnish Christian sect
- Quakers – Christian religious movement with a doctrine of divine revelation via their inward light
- Radical Pietism – Pietists who broke with Lutheranism
- Shtundists – Protestant evangelicals in the Russian Empire
- Tolstoyan movement – Social movement based on the views of Leo Tolstoy

== See also ==
- Folk religion – Expressions of religion distinct from the doctrines of organized religion

== Sources ==
- Berdyaev, Nikolai (1999) [1916]. "Духовное христианство и сектантство в России" [Spiritual Christianity and Sectarianism in Russia]. Russkaya Mysl (Русская мысль, "Russian Thought"). translated by S. Janos – via berdyaev.com.
- Camfield, Graham P. (October 1990). "The Pavlovtsy of Khar'kov Province, 1886-1905: Harmless Sectarians or Dangerous Rebels?". The Slavonic and East European Review. 68 (4). Modern Humanities Research Association and University College London, School of Slavonic and East European Studies: 692–717. JSTOR 4210447.
- Klibanov, Aleksandr I. (1982) [1965]. History of Religious Sectarianism in Russia (1860s–1917). Translated by Ethel Dunn. Oxford; New York: Pergamon Press. ISBN 0-08-026794-7.
- Sulzberger, C. L. (1977). The Fall of Eagles. New York: Crown Publishers. ISBN 0-517-52817-7.
- Zhuk, Sergei I. (2004). Russia's Lost Reformation: Peasants, Millennialism, and Radical Sects in Southern Russia and Ukraine, 1830–1917. Baltimore, Md: Johns Hopkins University Press. ISBN 978-0-8018-7915-9.
