= Russia–Uruguay relations =

- Russia: Uruguay

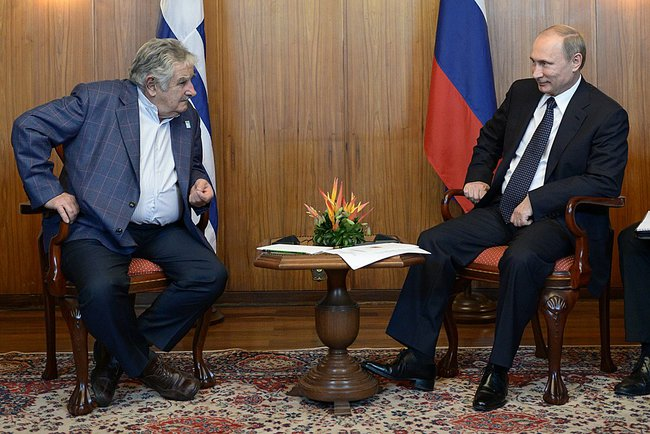
Vladimir Putin and José Mujica.

Russia–Uruguay relations are the bilateral foreign relations between Russia and Uruguay.

== History ==
Diplomatic relations between Russia and Uruguay were established in 1857, at the initiative of the Uruguayan president Gabriel Antonio Pereira who sent a letter to Tsar Alexander II, proposing closer ties between both countries. Thus, Uruguay was the first Latin American republic and the second Latin American state, after the Empire of Brazil, to be recognized by the Russian Empire. In 1866 a Russian consulate was established in Montevideo, and two years later, a Uruguayan consulate was established in Taganrog.

After the October Revolution of 1917, diplomatic relations were interrupted, but were reestablished in 1926. In 1935, during the dictatorship of Gabriel Terra, Uruguay broke relations with the Soviet Union, but they were reestablished again in 1943, during World War II.

== Resident diplomatic missions ==
- Russia has an embassy in Montevideo.
- Uruguay has an embassy in Moscow.
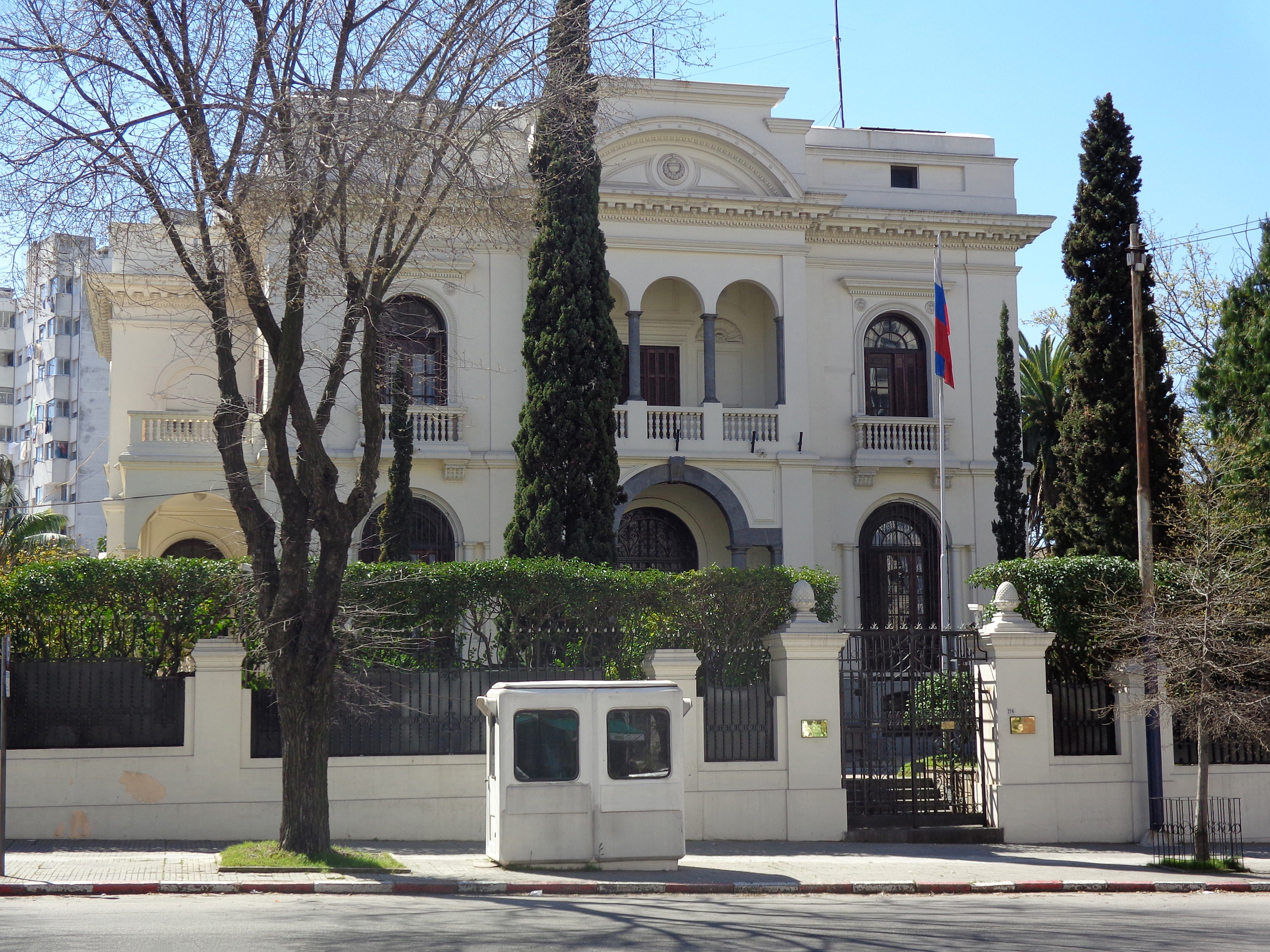
Embassy of Russia in Montevideo

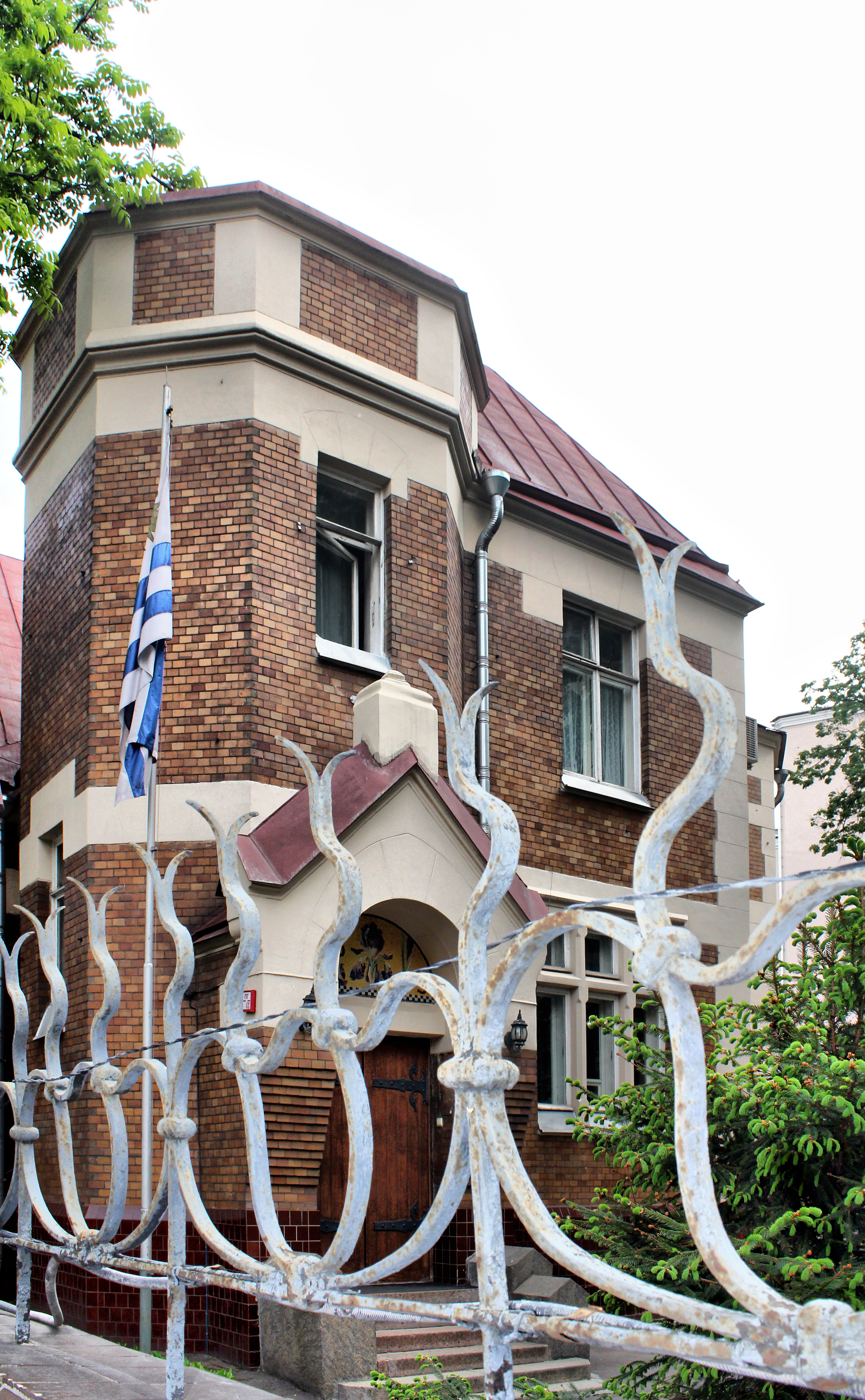
Embassy of Uruguay in Moscow

== See also ==
- Russians in Uruguay
