= Colonia Ofir =

Russian rural settlement in Uruguay

Colonia Ofir is a Russian rural settlement in Río Negro Department, Uruguay.

Established in 1966, it is made up of Old Believers, very protective of their religious traditions.

== See also ==
- Russians in Uruguay
