= Russian Orthodox Church of the Resurrection, Montevideo =

Russian Orthodox Church in Montevideo, Uruguay

Iglesia Ortodoxa Rusa de la Resurrección
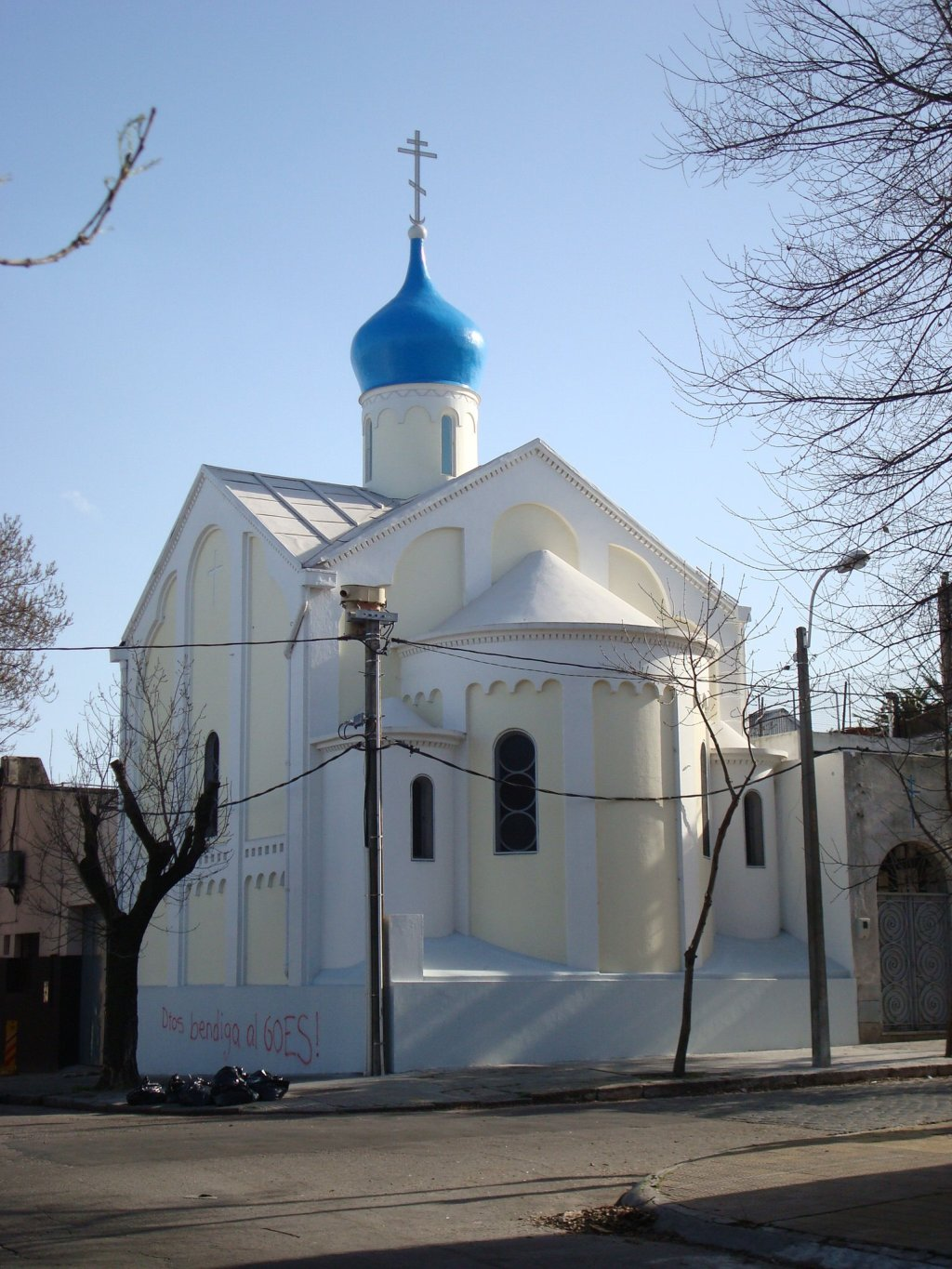

Religion
- Affiliation: Russian Orthodox
- Year consecrated: 1920

Location
- Location: Ramón del Valle Inclán 2761 esq. Colorado; Montevideo, Uruguay
- Interactive map of Iglesia Ortodoxa Rusa de la Resurrección
- Coordinates: 34°52′40″S 56°10′40″W

The Russian Orthodox Church of the Resurrection (Spanish: Iglesia Ortodoxa Rusa de la Resurrección) is an Eastern Orthodox church building in Montevideo, Uruguay. The parish was founded in 1920s.

Unique in its type and denomination in Uruguay, it is part of the Diocese of South America of the Russian Orthodox Church Outside of Russia. From the 1930s to present day, this church has been subject to oversight from archbishops located in Argentina, Brazil and Paraguay.

== See also ==
- Russian Orthodox Church
- Russians in Uruguay
