= Fioletovo =

Fioletovo Ֆիոլետովո
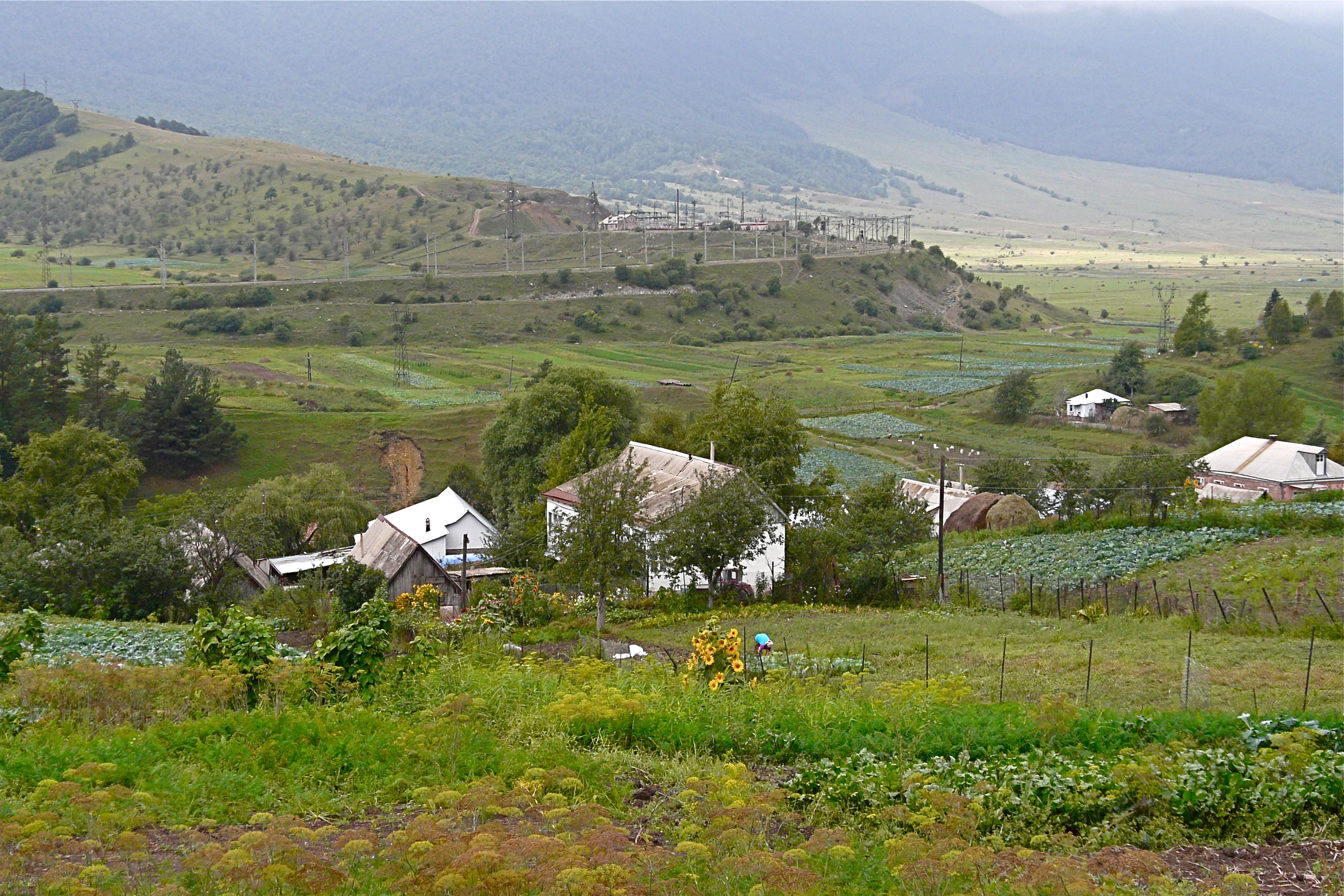

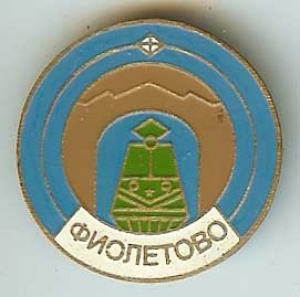
- Coat of arms

- Location within Armenia
- Coordinates: 40°43′29″N 44°42′50″E
- Country: Armenia
- Province: Lori
- Elevation: 1,670 m (5,480 ft)

Population (2022)
  - Total: 1,205
- Time zone: UTC+4 (AMT)

Fioletovo (Armenian: Ֆիոլետովո) is a village in the Lori Province of Armenia.

== Toponymy ==
The village was known as Nikitino until 1936, when it was renamed Fioletovo in honour of the Russian Communist activist and one of the 26 Baku Commissars Ivan Fioletov.

== Geography ==
The village has an extremely cold winter with a cool and mild summer. It lies under a thick layer of snow during the long winter season, where only the roofs of houses could be seen from the top with their smoking chimneys.

== History ==
In the 1840s the village was settled by Spiritual Christians relocated from Russia. In the present-day, the village is inhabited mostly by congregations of Dukh-i-zhizniki and one congregation of Molokane. The population of the village is diminishing year by year as emigration is growing among its residents, who are trying to look for better economic conditions.

In 2023, the first heritage museum of Molokans in Armenia was opened in Fioletovo.

== Demographics ==
Most of the population of Fioletovo are Spiritual Christians from Russia divided into about five religious congregations. Most meet in houses. The majority are about four congregations of Dukh-i-zhizniki, and the minority are one congregation of Molokane.

Fioletovo Population Change 2001-2022
Year	Total	Male	Female	Total Change
2001	1,273	610	663	
2011	1,178	595	583	-95 (-7.5%)
2011	1,070	514	556	-108 (-9.2%)

The chart shows a steady decrease in population of about 8% per decade since 2000.

== Gallery ==
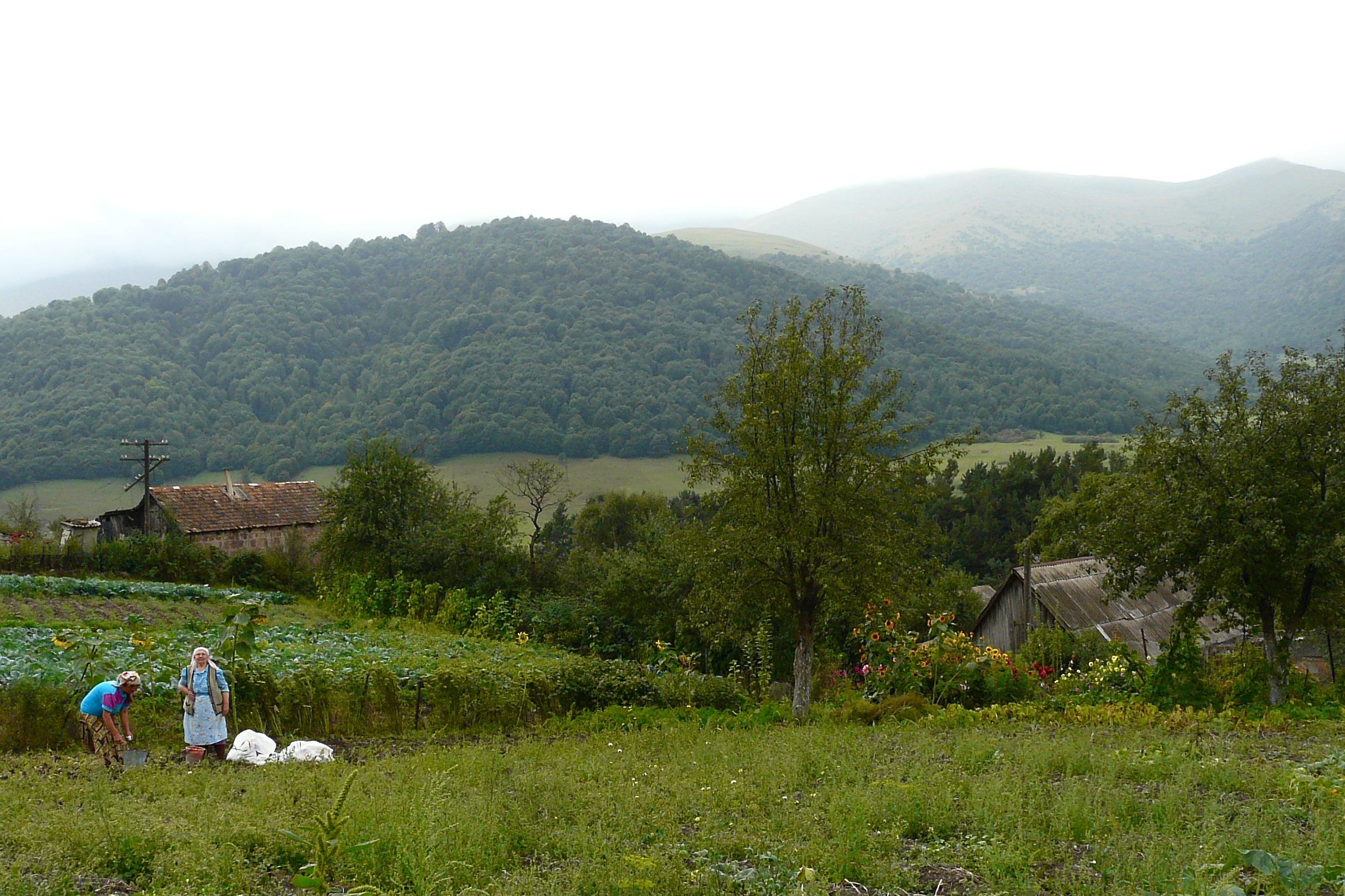
Fioletovo

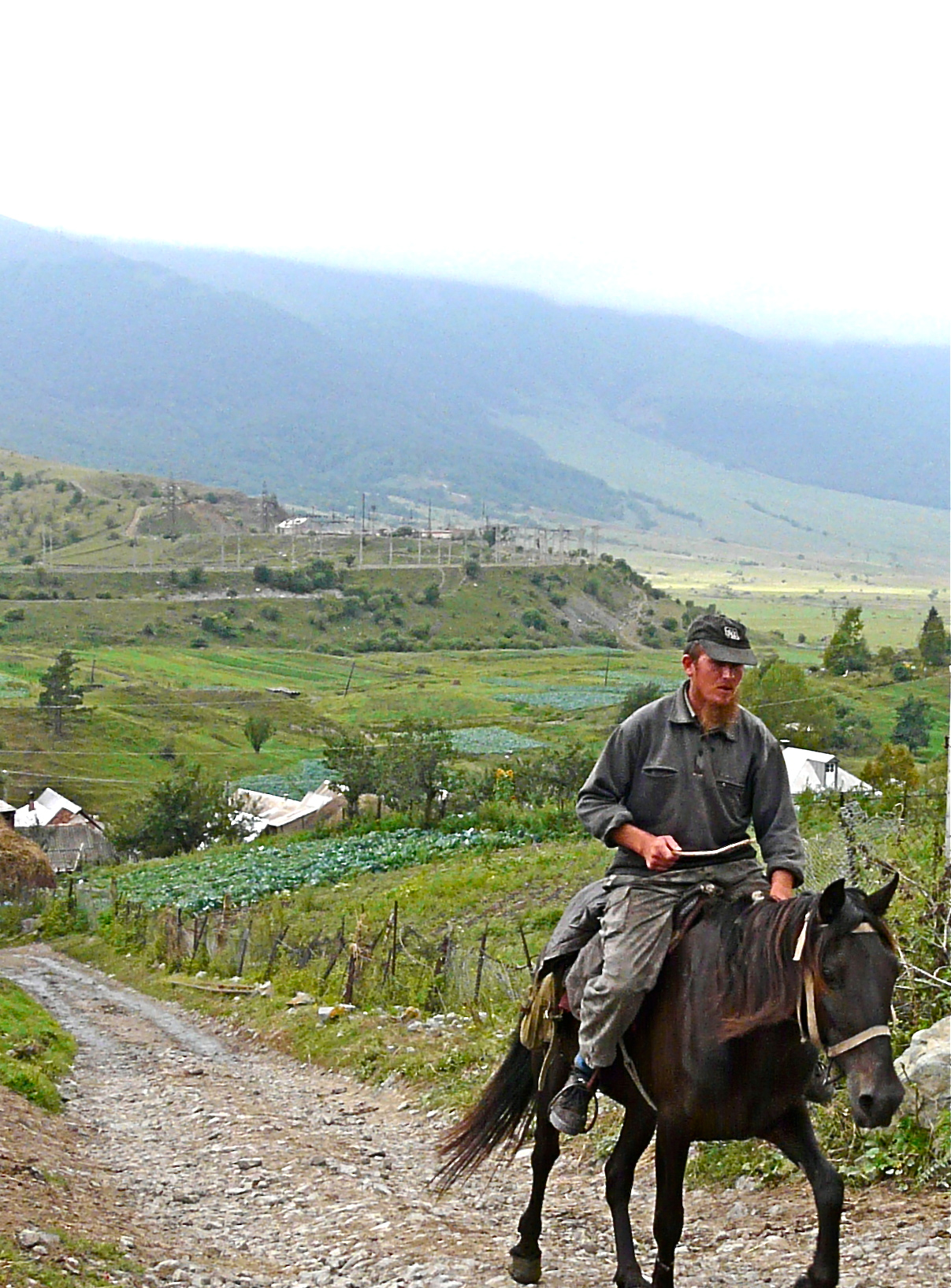
A villager in Fioletovo

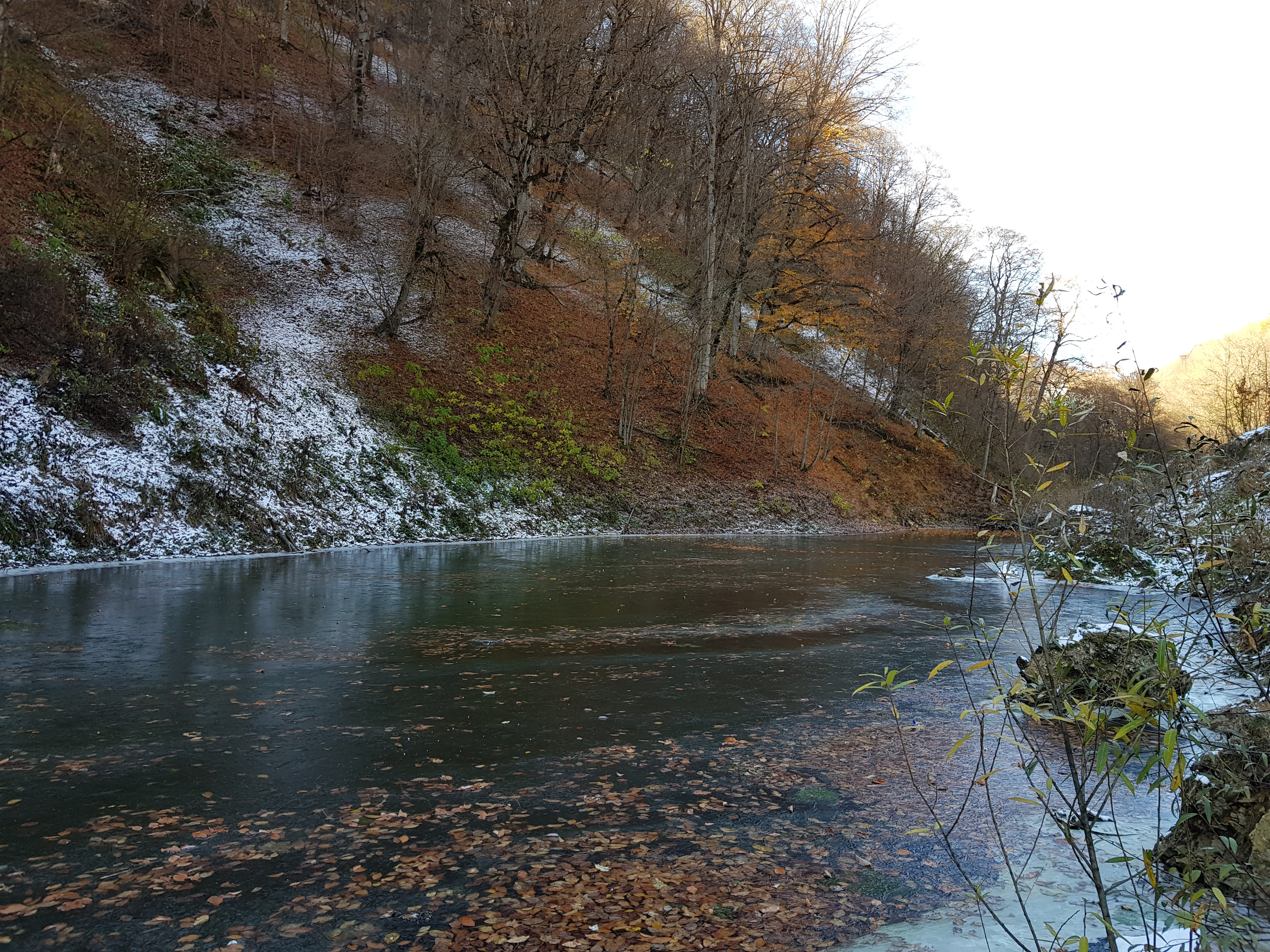

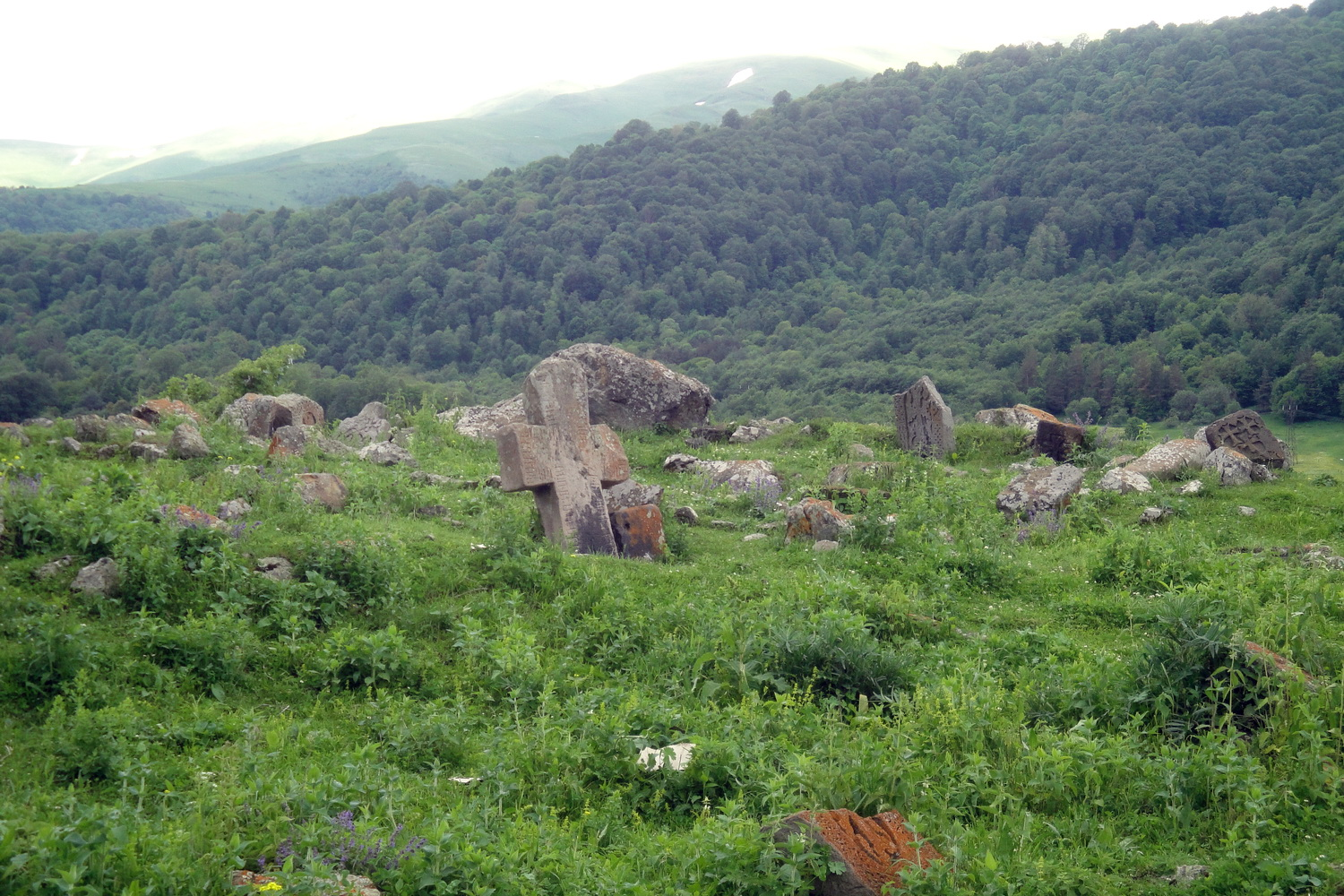
