= New Israel =

New Russian Spiritual Christian movement

New Israel (Russian: Новый Израиль, romanized: Novyy Israil') was one of the Spiritual Christian new religious movements that grew and expanded in the Russian Empire in the late 19th to early 20th century, a branch of the Postniki (fasters). The movement was the result of the schisms that split the "Old Israel" (Staroizrail) sect after the death of Perfil Katasonov. Its founder was a peasant named Mokshin, but it rose to notability only under Mokshin's successor, Vasiliy Semionovitch Lubkov (Василий Семенович Лубков, born December 24, 1869).

In the 1910s, members of the sect emigrated to Uruguay, where they founded the town of San Javier.

New Israel was strongly influenced by the Dukhovnye Khristiane movement, and in turn gave rise to two new religious sects called Noviy soyuz dukhovnovo Israilia (Новый союз духовного Израиля) and Novohristianskiy soyuz (Новохристианский союз).

Although persecuted in the Soviet Union, the group continues to this day.

== Religious views ==
The New Israel religion believes that there is only one living true God. The sect rejects the typical view of Mystery in God, and therefore rejects most of traditional practices, while keeping only some. Therefore, the consumption of any type of food including meat is acceptable. Church marriages are replaced with civil marriages. The civil marriage allows the selection of a partner dukhovnitsu (духовницу) by the will of God or a leader (prophet), in this case family ties are not considered.

== History ==
In 1891, Lubkov, who was 22 at the time, declared himself to be the living God and took control over the New Israel. In 1905, under the leadership of Lubkov, the church moved its center of operations to Rostov-on-Don. The church later spread its influence over the south of Russia.

In 1911, Lubkov visited Molokane in San Francisco, California, United States, to seek refuge for his followers, but did not consider it suitable. Also in 1911, he met with an Uruguayan consul, Hose Richlingom.

In 1912, two representatives of the Uruguayan president, Jose Batlle y Ordoñez, visited the Caucasus to visit the potential immigrants. They so highly appreciated their workmanship and skill that in July 1913 two ships, "18 de Julio" and "Taongarupa", brought 300 families to the coast of the river Uruguay 164 kilometers from Montevideo.

From 1913 to 1914, about 2,000 followers (10%) under the leadership of Lubkov immigrated to Uruguay and established a farming town San Javier, Uruguay. There Lubkov set up his very restrictive rules. He confiscated all the possessions of his followers and turned them into essentially one family. If anyone went against him he was told Za okolitsu! (За околицу!), which meant that he was supposed to get his personal belongings and leave the town. None of the immigrants, except for Lubkov, knew the local language or socialized with the local people, and therefore had a strong dependence on Lubkov.

In the end of the 1920s, Lubkov arranged for a land grant in eastern Rostov oblast, north of other Spiritual Christians (Dukhobortsy, Molokane, Pryguny) in the Tselinsky District. An about 300 people moved from Uruguay to the Soviet Union, to their village commune along the Manych River which they called New Israel. During Collectivization Soviets renamed it Red October (Krasnyy Oktyabr'). Some families arrived later from Uruguay but settled in other areas of Northern of the Caucasus.

During the World War II the New Israel immigrants sent aid in the form of sweaters through the Red Cross back to the Soviet Union.

In 1972, the Uruguay government repressed the town of San Javier by destroying the local library named after Maksim Gorkiy and burned all the books both in the library and in all the houses. They also arrested many of the graduates from Russian universities.
