= Kartanoism =

Finnish Christian sect

Kartanoism (kartanolaisuus, after the founder) was a Christian sect in the 1920s through the 1950s in Finland, mostly in the Satakunta region. The main centres of influence were Huittinen and Vampula, which were considered the "mother parishes" of the movement, but Kartanoism was also present in at least Kangasniemi, Lavia, Sippola and Juupajoki. The leaders of the movement were Alma Maria Kartano (1885–1953) and the "sleeping preacher" Amanda Matilda "Tilda" Reunanen (1894–1965). At first, they led the movement together, but later went their own ways because of personal arguments.

The movement was most famous for its child preachers. These child preachers numbered around ten. At its largest, the movement had around 100 members, but its societies all over Finland gathered large crowds, even over 1,000. As well as the child preachers, the movement was known for Tilda Reunanen's spirited sermons.

Alma Kartano, the founder of the movement, had studied in the Sortavala deaconess academy, but she never graduated as a deaconess. After this, she took a one-year travelling school teacher course in the Hämeenlinna teachers' seminar. She stayed in Inkerinmaa for long periods of time, where the local preacher Voldemar Kurki introduced her to the Russian skoptsy - "castrater" and khlysts - "whipper" communities. Becoming acquainted with these movements convinced Kartano that all kinds of sexuality were evil, even when in marriage.

The sermons of Kartanoism were best known for significant coverage of waiting for the end of the world. The second coming of Jesus was thought to be coming immediately, and before it, the sinful world would receive its punishment. The Winter War provided a good reason to declare that the Wrath of God would be wrought upon the infidels. The Kartanoists themselves thought they had founded a bridal parish for the end of times, which Jesus would embrace as his own when he came. On the other hand, Kartanoism did not try to organise itself to a separate community, instead its members stayed within the Lutheran church.

Kartanoist life was strictly asceticist, including most of all total sexual abstinence, even in marriage. Women were forced to wear dark-coloured clothes, cover their heads in scarves and dress in long dresses, to avoid rousing sexual urges in men. Children were raised severely, even cruelly. The movement held prayer and sermon meetings, which could last well into the night. They included long kneeling prayers, preferably with the face pressed into the floor, and praying in such a loud voice "that the devil would flee away". The prayer meetings would often end in ecstatic experiences, where participants banged their heads and hands on the floor, shouted and wailed, had visions, spoke in tongues and prophesied.

Kartanoism received negative publicity as a result of a trial in 1935 regarding an incident in which a number of children from a nearby village were forced to work for long hours without food. The court case, which was held behind closed doors due to the sensitivity of the case, drew the attention of newspapers. After this, the movement received negative publicity in various other contexts, including a 1937 book by Eino Hosia from Satakunta called Tulipunaiset ratsastajat ("The scarlet riders"), which was critical of the movement.

After Alma Kartano's death, the movement faded away. There are currently very few Kartanoists, and they are usually integrated into the local Lutheran parishes.

== Literature and Media ==
- Eino Hosia: Tulipunaiset ratsastajat, novel, 1938.
- Kartanolaisuus. Sadismia ja perverssiä sukupuolielämää Jumalan nimen varjolla. Additional printing of Lalli magazine, 1950.
- Saara Beckman: Tiesivätkö he mitä tekivät?, self-published, 1999.
- Benjamin Tweddell: "Sermons in a House of Grief", a long novella in homage to Alma. Published in Bucharest by Mount Abraxas Press, 2019.
- Mansion: a Finnish heavy/doom metal band composed of members who are, ostensibly, practitioners of Kartanoism, and whose output includes three EPs (2013, 2014, and 2015) and two LPs (2018 and 2023)

== Sources ==
- Satakunnan Kansa Sunday 20 November 2005
- Huovila, Aarre: Kartanolaisuus. Pastoraalitutkielma Helsingin tuomiokapitulille, 1962.
