= San Javier, Uruguay =

San Javier
- Town
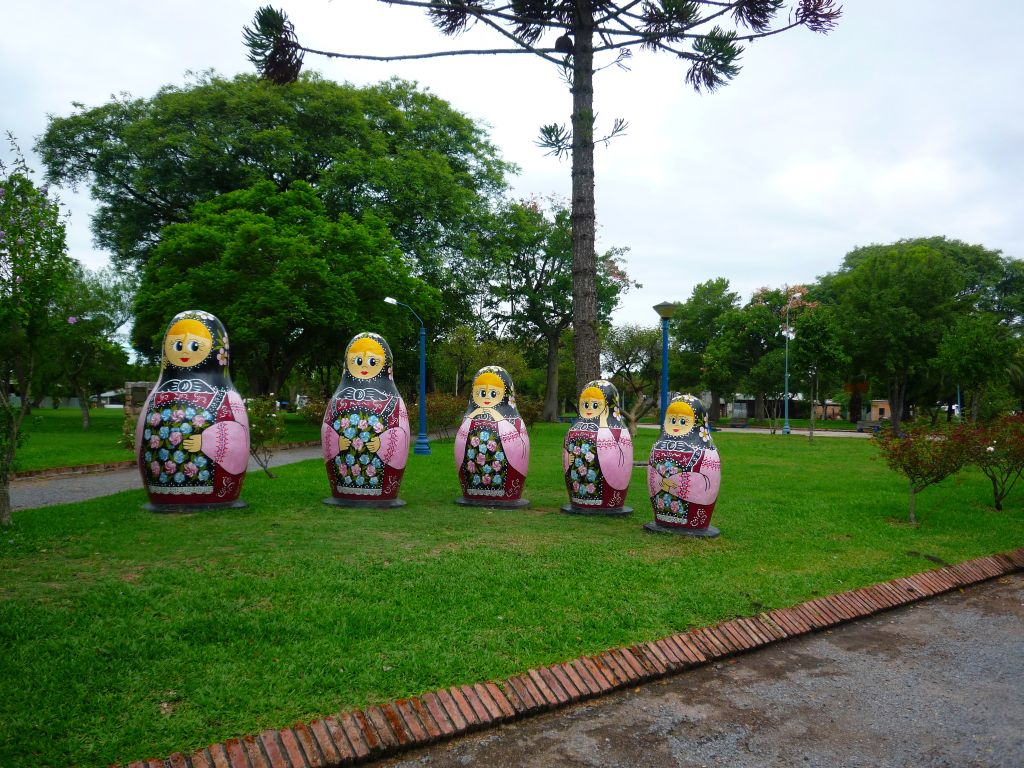
- Plaza de la Libertad, San Javier

- Location in Uruguay
- Coordinates: 32°41′0″S 58°8′0″W
- Country: Uruguay
- Department: Río Negro Department
- Founded: 1913
- Elevation: 23 m (75 ft)

Population (2011)
  - Total: 1,781
- Time zone: UTC -3
- Postal code: 65001
- Dial plan: +598 4569 (+4 digits)

San Javier (Сан-Хавьер) is a town situated on the east bank of the river Río Uruguay in the Río Negro Department of Uruguay. It was founded in 1913 by a Russian group of settlers, members of the New Israel religious sect, who migrated under the influence of the then spiritual leader Vasily Lubkov, from the Voronezh region of Russia.

== Geography ==
It is located 14 kilometres (8.7 mi) west of Route 24, 95 kilometres (59 mi) north of the department capital Fray Bentos, 55 kilometres (34 mi) west of Young and 50 kilometres (31 mi) south of Paysandú, the capital of Paysandú Department. Russian is the second official language after Spanish.

== History ==
A populated centre was founded here by 300 families of Russian settlers on 27 July 1913 They belonged to the Russian sect New Israel and were seeking religious freedom, which was denied to them under the Czar. Their leader, Basilio Lubkov had been imprisoned in Russia as a religious dissident. The settlers introduced the sunflower, as well as some advanced agricultural techniques to Uruguay. They constructed a flour mill and the first sunflower oil producing plant in the country.

On 1 July 1953, the status of San Javier was elevated to "Pueblo" (village) by the Act of Ley Nº 11.969. Until then, it had been the head of the judicial section of "Bellaco". On 17 November 1964 its status was further elevated to "Villa" (town) by the Act of Ley Nº 13.299.

=== Military Dictatorship (1973-84) ===
During the Uruguayan military dictatorship (1973–84) the Russian inhabitants were persecuted, as the military saw each one as a possible communist sympathizer. Many residents stopped speaking Russian, and most Russian books were destroyed. The cultural centre Máximo Gorki—where music, dance and other cultural activities were held—was closed, and traditional dance costumes were burnt. In 1984, the town became known throughout Uruguay for the execution of Vladimir Roslik, a Russian-Uruguayan medical doctor who was tortured and later killed by the Uruguayan military. For some he is a hero and a symbol of internal struggle in Uruguay.

=== Return of Democracy ===
With the restoration of democracy by 1989, the cultural centre Máximo Gorki has again been revived as a focal point for cultural activities in the town. It is home of the traditional dance group Kalinka, who have won many prizes in Uruguayan dance competitions.

Today the inhabitants of San Javier are proud to have maintained many of their traditions, including food, dances, embroidery and music. They celebrate a festival on 27 July, the date of foundation, with a feast of traditional food, music and dancing. Over the years, Russian marriages have been memorable events with three days of festivities that include dancing, singing, and traditional meals.

=== Centennial ===
In July 2013, celebrations were held remembering the arrival of the first Russian settlers.

== Population ==
In 2011, San Javier had a population of 1,781, of which 98% were of Russian descent.

| Year | Population |
|---|---|
| 1908 | 986 |
| 1963 | 1,178 |
| 1975 | 940 |
| 1985 | 1,461 |
| 1996 | 1,358 |
| 2004 | 1,680 |
| 2011 | 1,781 |

Source: Instituto Nacional de Estadística de Uruguay

== Esteros de Farrapos National Park ==
The town is one of two access points for the new Esteros de Farrapos National Park and Islands of the Uruguay River, which is recognised under the Ramsar Convention as a Wetland of International Significance. Esteros de Farrapos which is 17,496 Ha, includes 24 islands. It one of the last known refuge for the puma in Uruguay, and the only protected area where maned wolf have been recorded. Over 200 species of birds have been recorded in the park, 30 mammals, 14 reptiles, 8 amphibians and many butterflies.

Tourism is not yet well developed in the park, however there is limited accommodation in San Javier, and a well-equipped camping area at nearby Puerto Viejo ('Old Port'). Activities including fishing, boating, horse riding and birdwatching. Boats are available for hire, as well as experienced nature guides.

== Bibliography ==
- Martínez, Virginia (2013). The Russians of San Javier (in Spanish). Montevideo: Ediciones de la Banda Oriental. p. 298. ISBN 9789974108509. Archived from the original on 28 May 2016.
