= Vladimir Roslik =

Vladimir Roslik (c. 1941 – c. 1984) was a doctor who was arrested and killed during the Uruguayan military dictatorship of 1973–1985.

He was the last victim to die under torture during this dictatorship prior to the return of democracy in 1985.

Roslik was born and had died in San Javier, Río Negro. He studied medicine in the USSR, at the Patrice Lumumba University. Several monuments to him stand in his hometown.

== Bibliography ==
- Martínez, Virginia (2013). The Russians of San Javier (in Spanish). Montevideo: Ediciones de la Banda Oriental. p. 298. ISBN 9789974108509. Archived from the original on 2016-05-28.
