= Postniki =

19th Century religious sect in Russia

The Postniki (постники "fasters") were a millennial sect of 19th century Southern Russia, a branch of the Khlysty (flagellants) movement, founded by Abbakum (or Avvakum) Ivanov Kopylov (Аббакум / Аввакум Копылов, 1756–1838), a peasant of the Tambov Oblast. Kopylov declared himself the living Christ and gathered a considerable following in the 1820s. After Kopylov's death in 1838, the sect disintegrated in various schisms, giving rise to follow-up groups such as the Staroizrail (Old Israel) sect led by Kopylov's disciple Perfil Katasonov.

Soviet scholar A.I. Klibanov still encountered several postniki in Rasskazovo in 1959.
