= Heterodoxy =

Opinions or practices which vary from official positions

In religion, heterodoxy (from Ancient Greek: héteros, 'other, another, different' + dóxa, 'popular belief') means "any opinions or doctrines at variance with an official or orthodox position".

Heterodoxy is also an ecclesiastical jargon term, defined in various ways by different religions and churches. For example, in some groups, heterodoxy may describe beliefs that differ from strictly orthodox views but that fall short either of formal or of material heresy.

== Christianity ==
=== Eastern Orthodoxy ===
In the Eastern Orthodox Church, the term is used primarily in reference to Christian churches and denominations not belonging to the communion of Eastern Orthodox churches and espousing doctrines contrary to the received Holy Tradition.

=== Protestantism ===
Charles Spurgeon said:

[Y]ou shall find spiritual life in every church. I know it is the notion of the bigot, that all the truly godly people belong to the denomination which he adorns. Orthodoxy is my doxy; heterodoxy is anybody else's doxy who does not agree with me.

== Islam ==
The Arabic word ghulat is used by Shia Muslims for beliefs perceived as being extremely heterodox (more in line with the Christian use of the word "heresy"). In particular, the term is used to describe the beliefs of minority Muslim groups who ascribe divine characteristics to a member of Muhammad's family (especially Ali) or the early companions of the Prophet such as Salman the Persian. The assumption is that the groups thus described have gone too far and have come to associate them with God (shirk).

Sunni and Shia Muslims see each other as heterodox, differing in practice mainly on matters of jurisprudence or fiqh, splitting historically on the matter of the succession of Ali to the caliphate by Muawiyah. A third and much smaller movement is Ibadi, which differ from both of these groups on a few key points. Several ultra-orthodox groups such as the Wahhabis, in turn, see themselves as the only truly orthodox groups within Islam.

According to Philip Hitti, during the Umayyad and Abbasid caliphates there was a marked tendency among several quite unrelated heterodox groups to affiliate themselves with the Shiites, particularly the Ismailis, in a general feeling of heterodox solidarity in a Sunni-controlled empire. The cause of the Alids thus became a rallying point for a diverse range of heterodox Islamic movements. The view that Ali was divine, though never mainstream within Shiism, is attested in the early centuries of Islam.

== Hinduism ==
The main schools of Indian philosophy that reject the absoluteness of the Vedas, including Buddhism and Jainism, were regarded as heterodox by Hinduism. In 2015, the Supreme Court of India ruled that Hinduism cannot be narrowed down to particular beliefs or doctrine, saying that it "incorporates all forms of belief without mandating the selection or elimination of any one single belief".

== China ==
In late 1999, legislation was created in China to outlaw "heterodox religions". This was applied retroactively to Falun Gong, a new religious movement introduced to the public in China by Li Hongzhi in 1992.

== Economics ==
Heterodox economics refers to schools of economic thought considered outside of mainstream economics, referred to as orthodox economics, often represented by expositors as contrasting with or going beyond neoclassical economics.

Heterodox economics refers to the consideration of a variety of economic schools and methodologies, which can include neoclassical or other orthodox economics in part. Heterodox economics refers to a variety of separate unorthodox approaches or schools such as institutional, post-Keynesian, socialist, Marxian, feminist, Georgist, Austrian, ecological, and social economics, among others.

== See also ==
- Adiaphora
- Āstika and nāstika
- Catholicity
- Christian apologetics
- Christian countercult movement
- Christian heresy
- Gnosticism
- Orthodoxy
- Schism
- Sikh sects
