= Staroizrail =

19th Century religious sect in Russia

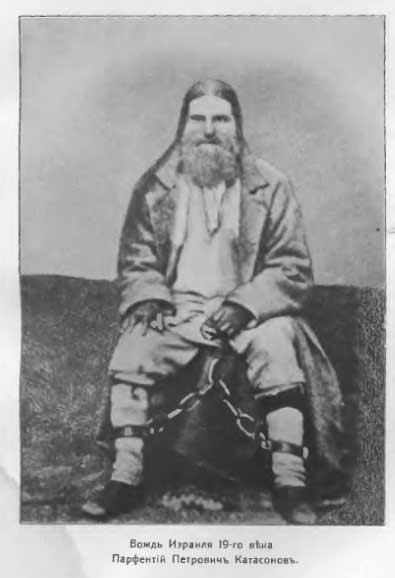
Perfil Katasonov

Old Israel (Staroizrail) was a 19th-century sect founded in the 1830s by Perfil Katasonov, a disciple of Abbakum Kopylov, the founder of the Postniki (Fasters) sect, as the result of a schism. Its adherents considered themselves to be the Chosen People establishing the Kingdom of God on earth. The sect disintegrated into various spin-off sects, among them New Israel, at the death of its founder.
