= Shtundists =

Protestant evangelicals in the Russian Empire

The Shtundists (Russian: Штундисты, Shtundisty; Ukrainian: Штундисти, Shtundysty; British English: Stundists) are the predecessors of several Evangelical Protestant groups in Ukraine and across the former Soviet Union.

== History ==
The movement refers to evangelical groups that emerged among peasants in Ukraine when the country was part of the Russian Empire in the second half of the 19th century. The Shtundists were heavily influenced by German Baptists, Pietists and Mennonites that settled in the southern parts of the Russian Empire, and somewhat by indigenous Spiritual Christians. Their origin is associated with access to Bibles from the British and Foreign Bible Society.

The word Shtundist is derived from the German word Stunde ("hour"), in reference to the practice of setting aside an hour for daily Bible study. The term was originally used in a derogatory sense, but has also been adopted by many adherents to this tradition.

== Creed ==
An American news article published in 1896 described their "Creed":

- Since 1864 they have published the New Testament in a pocket edition, which are found in every Stundist's possession.
- They refuse to take part in war and regard usury as sin.
- They are noted for their cleanliness, honesty and temperance, having banished intoxicating liquors.
- The Shtundists have no common confession of faith. They acknowledge only the Bible, on the interpretation of which they do not entirely agree.
- They have [volunteer lay] presbyters and elders at the head of their congregations, who are older and experienced men.
- They have no typical church buildings, but worship in some hall or generally in the largest room of someone's private house. At one end there is a table and a chair for the elder.
- When the members enter they salute each other with the [holy] kiss of fraternal love.
- Women and men sit apart.
- Their hymnal singing is especially good. Some of the hymns have been translated into English.
- After the hymn the elder reads a chapter out of the Bible and explains it, and each one present is privileged to make remarks.
- The women, in compliance with St. Paul's injunction, are required to be silent auditors.
- Their prayers are always done in a kneeling posture.
- The services are closed with the Lord's Prayer.
- Regarding marriage. The parents of the bride and bridegroom present the couple to the elder. The bride is first asked if she wishes to enter the state of holy matrimony with this young man, if she loves him, and if she is taking this step of her own free will and under no compulsion, not even that of her parents. When the bridegroom has answered similar questions a hymn is sung and a prayer is spoken. Then the elder tells the couple to embrace each other and to grasp the right hands. This ends the ceremony. … This ceremony is not recognized by the law of Russia, as only the Russian Church can legally perform this ceremony.

The Ukrainian anarchist revolutionary and writer Sergey Stepniak described his impressions of their "religious doctrine" that he witnessed while growing up in Ukraine:

- Much like the Baptists or the Anabaptists of Reformation times, they baptize only adults, re-baptizing those to whom this sacrament was administered in babyhood.
- Instead of the sacrament of communion they have what is called simply "the breaking of bread," accompanied with singing of hymns.
- Both communion and baptism are viewed by the Shtundists, not as sacraments, but as "rites performed in commemoration of Christ, and for a closer union with Him."
- They consider icons as no better than pictures and do not keep them in their houses.
- They formally recognize only the Lord's Prayer. Prayers [in general] are left to the personal inspiration of the believers.
- At their meetings they sing hymns of their own composition, as well as Psalms.
- It is prohibited among them to mistreat even dumb creatures.
- There is no conscious leaning towards collective ownership of land. All earthly goods are lent by God to men, who will be held responsible before Him for the use they have made of their worldly possessions.
- To prove faithful these men are bound to come to the assistance of their neighbours when they are in need, sickness, or affliction. [They also exhibit a] perfect absence of national and religious intolerance.
- The Stundist catechism is simply a translation of the catechism of the Tiflis Baptists.

In the 1890s, Pobedonostzev, supervisor of the Russian Orthodox Church, ordered all heretics and sectarians, non-Orthodox faiths of ethnic Russians (raskolniki and sectarians), to be reformed or punished. During this time many were persecuted, arrested, beaten and thousands were exiled to Siberia and the Caucasus.

== Unification of related denominations ==
A revival led to the formation of a denomination known as the Evangelical Christians (Евангельские христиане Yevangel'skiye khristane) which first appeared in 1909 when a British missionary, Granville Radstock, started preaching among the imperial Russian aristocracy. Led by the engineer Ivan Prokhanov and mostly rooted in the Pietist tradition, they formed a nationwide association in St Petersburg, the All-Russian Evangelical Christian Union. Prokhanov's parents had left the Spiritual Christian Molokan faith, and many Molokane switched to his similar but more organized group. These evangelical groups came under pressure in Soviet times, with many adherents being incarcerated or deported.

Conditions changed somewhat during the late 1940s, when most evangelical, Baptist and Pentecostal groups were led, with some pressure from the Soviet state, to form the All-Soviet Association of Evangelical Baptist Christians (Всесоюзный совет евангельских христиан-баптистов Vsesoyuznyy sovet yevangel'skikh khristan-baptistov, abbreviated ВСЕХБ, VSYeKhB), which was later also joined by Mennonites.

== Recent history ==
Prior to its independence in 1991, Ukraine was home to the second-largest Baptist community in the world, after the United States, and was called the “Bible Belt” of the Soviet Union. Despite mass emigration of formerly persecuted Ukrainian Protestants to the West, Ukraine's Baptists continue to be the largest Protestant denomination in the country, which has the second-highest number of Baptist churches in the world.

In Russia, the Evangelical Christian Baptists (Евангельские христиане-баптисты Yevangel'skiye khristane-baptisty) still form the largest Protestant denomination with about 80,000 adherents.

During the late 20th century, Shtundism also extended its influence to Germany when many former Soviet citizens of German origin emigrated there and set up parishes and gospel halls, mostly referring to themselves as Evangeliumschristen ("Gospel Christians").

The Shtundists helped many Ukrainian Jews hide from the Nazis during the Holocaust.

== See also ==
- Baptists in Ukraine
- Brotherhood of Independent Baptist Churches and Ministries of Ukraine
- Evangelical Baptist Union of Ukraine
- Ukrainian Evangelical Baptist Convention of Canada
- Union of Evangelical Christians-Baptists of Russia
- Biblists
