= Protestantism in Ukraine =

Aspect of religious life in Ukraine

Percentage of parishes
Parishes	Percentage
Evangelical Baptists	8.9%
Pentecostals	5.6%
Seventh-day Adventists	3.7%

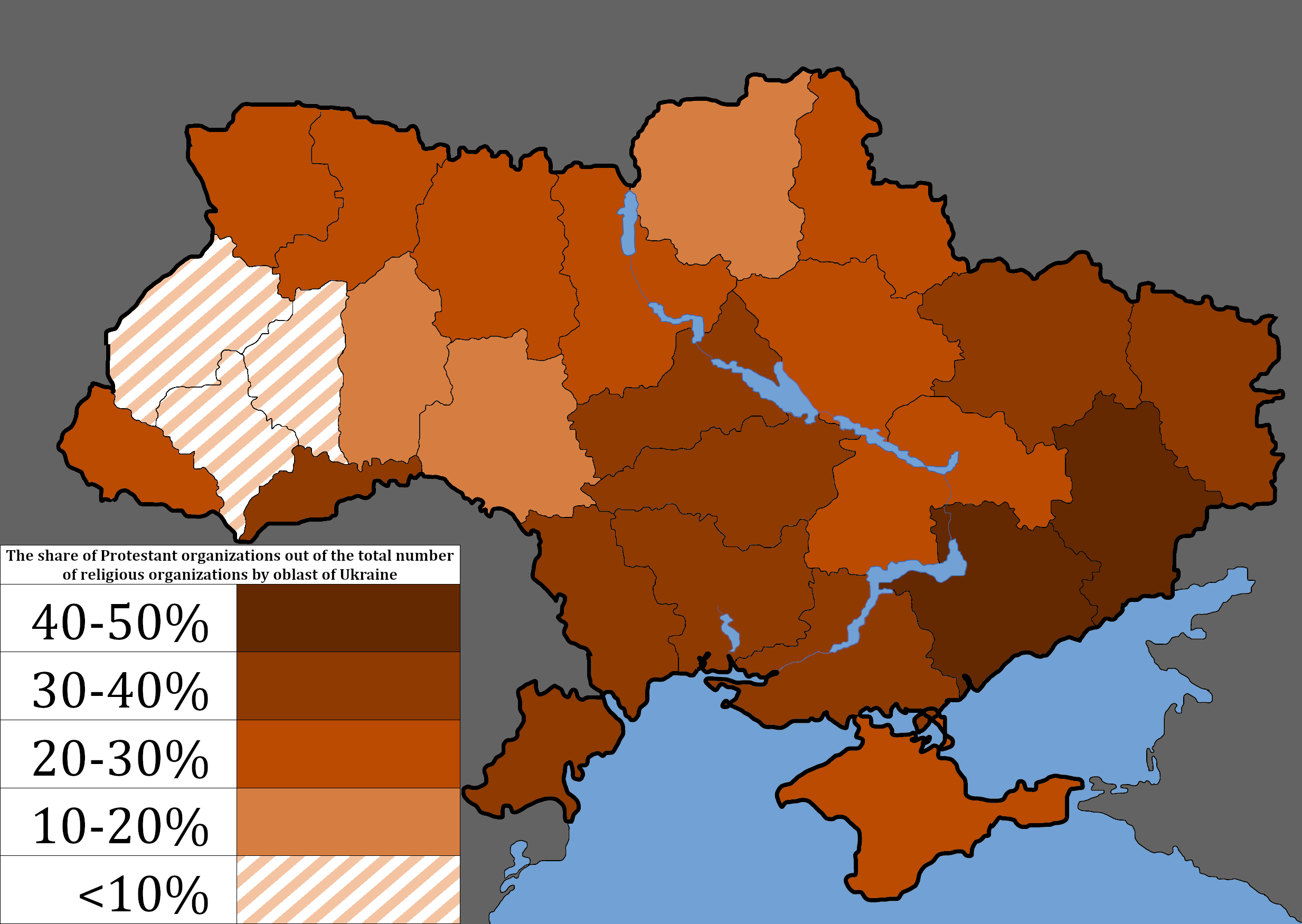
Percentage of Protestant religious organizations out of the total number of religious organizations by oblast of Ukraine, as of 2006.

Protestants in Ukraine number about 1.7 million (2010), about 3.8% of the total population, according to Operation World (Biblica Publishing, 2010). Nearly all traditional Protestant denominations are represented in the country. According to Christianity Today magazine, Ukraine has become not just the "Bible Belt" of Eastern Europe, but a "hub of evangelical church life, education, and missions". At present, the country is a key supplier of missionaries and a center of evangelical training and press printing for all the countries of the former Soviet Union, where the legal environment is not so favourable.

Compared to Protestants and Evangelicals in Western Europe and the United States, believers in Ukraine are considered to be more conservative and traditional. For most Western Evangelicals their way of life reflects a form of strict moral asceticism.

The earliest Protestants appeared in Ukraine in the 1530s and ’40s. They were preceded by various pre-Reformation movements, like the Bogomils and Hussites.

The first Protestant commune (Anabaptists) was established in Volodymyr-Volynsk in 1536. In the 1540s, primarily among the nobles, Lutherans, then Calvinists and some others began their activity. In the first half of the 17th century, the Socinians (Unitarians) were reported to operate. In the 17th century, Protestantism spread from Volhynia, Podlaskie, the Chełm region and western Ukrainian Galicia to Podillia, the Kyiv region, and southwestern Ukrainian Transcarpathia.

Today the All-Ukrainian Union of Churches of Evangelical Christian Baptists Church has nearly 150,000 members, the All-Ukrainian Union of Evangelical Christians (Pentecostal) claims about 105,000 members, and the Ukrainian Union of Seventh-day Adventists has nearly 40,000 members.

Due to the 1990 Lautenberg Amendment granting refugee status to Soviet religious minorities, some Ukrainian Protestants have emigrated to the United States and gone on to take an important part in local social activities. The Protestant Festival of Hope, with the participation of evangelist Franklin Graham, was held on July 6–8, 2007, and gathered more than 40,000 Ukrainians at the Olympic National Stadium in Kyiv. Guests of the festival were able to hear testimonies of faith by well-known athletes, evangelical activists, and civil leaders. There were musical groups of various genres from Ukraine, Russia, Belarus, Moldova, and the United States. Satellite transmission of the festival was organized in 75 halls in the majority regions of Ukraine.

== Baptists ==
The Baptist Church is one of the oldest Protestant denominations, and Evangelical Baptists are among the most active Christian confessions in Ukraine and the world.

In 16th-century Ukraine, German Anabaptists and Mennonites moved to Ukraine seeking refuge from Lutheran and Catholic persecution in their lands. During a spiritual revival among them in the 19th century they started reaching out to the local Ukrainian population with the Gospel, inviting them for an hour of Bible study. Since an hour in German is pronounced as Shtunde, the early converts became known as the Shtundists and later the Baptist denomination in Ukraine was created by them.

The first Baptist baptism (or "baptism by faith" of adult people) in Ukraine took place in 1864 on the river Inhul in the Yelizavetgrad province (now Kirovohrad Oblast), in a German settlement. In 1867, the first Baptist communities were organized in that area. From there, the trend spread to the south of Ukraine and then to other regions as well. One of the first Baptist communities was registered in Kyiv in 1907, and in 1908 the First All-Russian Convention of Baptists was held there. Than All-Russian Union of Baptists was established in the town of Yekaterinoslav (now Dnipro).

From the 1920s, Evangelical Christians and Baptists were prohibited in Soviet Ukraine. To some extent, they were revived during and after World War II. In 1944, Baptists and Evangelical Christians united in the Church of Evangelical Christian Baptists (ECB). They were later joined by other smaller Baptist and Evangelical trends. At the end of the 1950s, 75% of the believers of the All-USSR Council of ECB lived in Ukraine. Another reported revival was in the 1970s.

In the period after the Second World War, baptists and other Protestant believers in the USSR (Pentecostals, Adventists etc.) were compulsively sent to mental hospitals, endured trials and prisons (often for refusal to enter military service). Some were even deprived of their parent rights.

Some part of the baptists (as well as other Protestants groups of Ukraine) in last decades of 20th century emigrated to USA and Canada. After the collapse of the USSR, migration and interaction with Western churches increased. At present, there are large Ukrainian baptist communities in Sacramento, Philadelphia and Pennsylvania.

Nearly 90% of Baptists in Ukraine are united in the All-Ukraine Union of the Association of Evangelical Baptists (AUU AEB), established in 1994 at the 22nd Convention of the ECB of Ukraine. Today, the union includes 3 seminaries, 2 universities and 15 bible colleges. The union is engaged in publishing activity and has an extended mass media network. The AUU AEB is governed by a council composed of senior presbyters (bishops) of regional associations headed by the president of the council. In 1990—2006 the council was headed by Hryhorii Komendant. From May 2006 it has been headed by Viacheslav Nesteruk. The union closely cooperates with Ukrainian Baptists in the diaspora. The AUU AEB is a member of the European Baptist Federation and the Baptist World Alliance.

Baptists organized the 1-st International Christian Theater Festival in Rivne, which took place in July, 2007.

Former acting President of Ukraine and Chairman of Ukraine's parliament Oleksandr Turchynov, is a publicly acknowledged member of a Baptist church where he preaches regularly.

== Lutherans ==
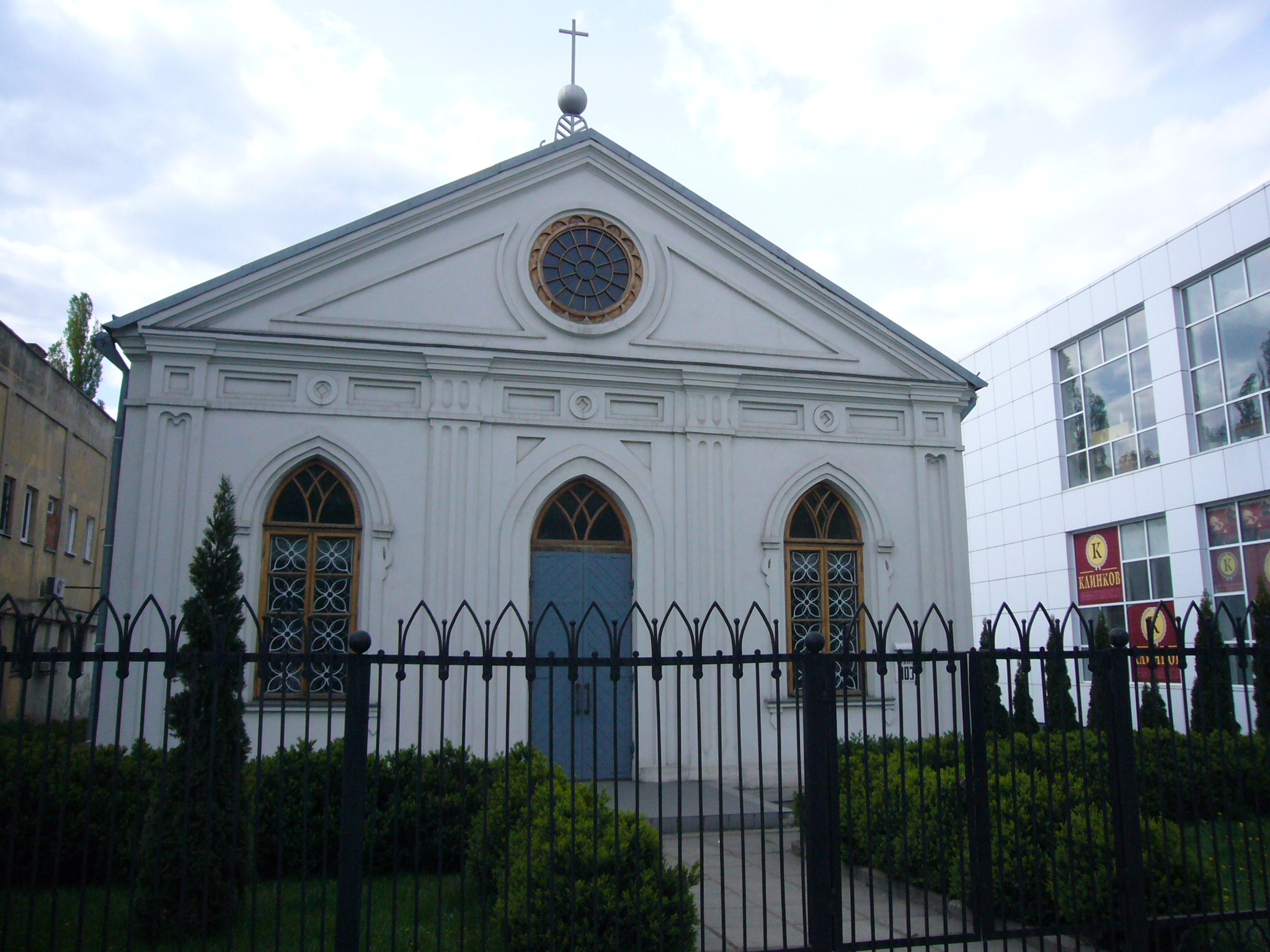
Saint Catherine Lutheran Church in Dnipro

Lutheranism has been known in Ukraine since the mid-16th century in Volhynia, Galicia, Kyiv, Podillia and Pobuzhzha. Certain members of the gentry (the Radzyvil family) were Lutherans. The influx of thousands of Germans to Ukrainian regions in the 19th century resulted in dramatic growth of the Lutheran Church but it appears that there was no significant influence within the local ethnic groups. The Lutheran Church of that era was governed by the General Consistory office in St. Petersburg, Russia, which maintained quality records of births, marriages, and deaths from 1835 onwards.

The Ukrainian Lutheran Church (The Ukrainian Evangelical Church of the Augsburg Confession) was founded in 1926. It was active in western Ukraine until 1939 and had twenty-five communities and many missions. The church had a seminary and a publishing house in Stanislaviv (now Ivano-Frankivsk), published the newspapers Stiah (Banner), Prozry (See the light) and Novii Svit (New World).

During the Soviet epoch, the ULC was persecuted and church property was confiscated. Many of the believers and pastors were oppressed, and some were forced to emigrate.

Since Ukraine became independent in 1991, ULC communities have renewed their activities in Kyiv, Ternopil, Kremenets, Zaporizhzhia, Sevastopol, Simferopol and other places. In 2002 a pastoral center of the German Lutheran Church closed by Stalin's atheistic regime in 1938 reopened in Odesa. On the same day, the sculpture of St. Paul, the church building and the organ were also consecrated there.

By 2007, the Ukrainian Lutheran Church conducted its ministry in 25 congregations and 11 mission stations all over the country, having about 2500 parishioners served by 22 national pastors and 2 missionaries from the USA.

There is also a German Evangelical Lutheran Church (GELC) in Ukraine.

== Pentecostals ==
Pentecostalism came to the Russian Empire, and from there to Ukraine, at the beginning of the 20th century. Pentecostals were preceded by indigenous Spiritual Christians, who prepared the ground for the movement's spread. Pentecostalism was brought to western Ukraine by emigrants who returned from the US. In 1920, the first organized communities appeared in Volyn, northwestern Ukrainian, and in 1924, the first Convention of Christians of the Holy Pentecost was held in Kremenets, where a union of Pentecostal communities was established.

Ivan Voronaev was among the first to introduce and expand the Pentecostal movement in Ukraine and Russia. The first Pentecostal church was established by him in Odesa in 1920.

During the Soviet period, many leaders of the movement were persecuted and spent years in prisons and concentration camps. Pentecostals in mass numbers were given 20-25 year prison terms and many perished there, including Voronaev.

The All-Ukraine Union of Christians of the Evangelical Faith-Pentecostals was revived in 1990. It incorporated Pentecostal communities from the All-USSR Association of the ECB, independently registered and unregistered churches, and missions.

The official press outlets of the AUU CEFP are the magazines "Blahovisnyk" (Announcer of Good News), "Yevanhelskyi holos" (Evangelical voice), and "Yevanhelyst" (Evangelist). Individual communities publish their own periodicals. Pentecostals are known for their radio and TV programs.

The missions "Holos nadii" (Voice of Hope) in Lutsk, "Vozmozhnost" (Ability) in Mariupol, and "Dobryi Samarianyn" (Good Samaritan) in Rivne are involved in active missionary activities.

There are nearly 20 Bible seminaries, institutes, and schools.

One of the most widely known neopentecostal groups in Ukraine is "Embassy of the Blessed Kingdom of God for all Nations" headed by Nigerian pastor Sunday Adelaja. The community holds mass gatherings and marches and takes an active part in local social life. A former mayor of Kyiv, Leonid Chernovetskyi, and many members of his team belong to the "Embassy of God" commune.

== Reformed ==
At the end of the 16th century approximately 100 Reformed churches existed in Ukraine.

In the 1920s Ukrainian Canadian Presbyterian missionaries revitalized the Reformed faith in Ukraine. In 1936 there were 35 churches and 3,000 members. After World War II, the soviet occupation destroyed much of the work.

In the 1990s the reformed heritage was further revitalized by Dutch missionaries, who renewed Reformed churches in Kyiv, Rivne, Stepan, Zakarpatia. The Evangelical Reformed Church in Ukraine has 7 congregations today. The Evangelical Reformed Seminary was also founded in Kyiv to train pastors.

Presbyterian missionaries of the Presbyterian Church in America worked in the Odesa region, in Kharkiv, Kherson, Kyiv and Mykolaiv. Today the Evangelical Presbyterian Church in Ukraine has 12 congregations and 11 national ordained pastors with expanding missions in Western Ukraine. The biggest churches are in Odesa and in Kyiv. The Evangelical Presbyterian Church of Ukraine was officially organised on April 16, 2008 in the Presbyterian church in Odesa at a celebration service.

=== Sub-Carpathian Reformed Church ===
The Sub-Carpathian Reformed Church (SCRC) declares its foundations on the works of Huldrych Zwingli and John Calvin written during the 1520s and 1530s. By 2007, it had 105 communities, 55 ministers and 105 churches. SCRC is considered to be the oldest Protestant community in Ukraine (first group of Reformers appeared in Sub-Carpathia in the 1530s) and, prior to the American Presbyterian missions, the only church of the Calvinist tradition. The majority of the SCRC faithful are ethnic Hungarians. The Church promoted the establishment of three specialized secondary schools (teaching additional religious and theological subjects), has its specialized charitable foundation, publishes a quarterly journal "Mission" (with 500 copies). Pastoral leaders are educated and trained mainly in Hungary, Romania and Slovakia (Sub-Carpathia borders on various countries, and Romanians, Hungarians, Slovaks and other ethnic groups live there, in addition to Ukrainians).

The Church is a member of World Alliance of Reformed Churches and by some estimations involves about 140,000 parishioners.

Several church buildings of reformers are well-known historical monuments and tourist attractions to Zakarpattya, namely a stone Gothic church in Muzhievo, a Gothic church in Chetfolvo (15th century), a Baroque church in Chetfolvo, and a Gothic church in Novoselytsia (Beken).

Leaders and members of the Sub-Carpathian Reformed Church were persecuted by the Communist authorities in the Soviet Union and were sent to Gulag labour camps in Siberia. By some estimations, 40,000 persons from Sub-Carpathia perished between Fall 1944 (when the Soviet Army invaded the territory) and 1956.

== Seventh-day Adventists ==
The Seventh-day Adventists appeared in 1847 in southwestern Ukraine's region near Chernivtsi. In 1876, the first small group of believers was formed in Rivne region. In 1886, a group of people was baptized in Crimea by Pastor Lui Konrad, who founded the first community of Seventh-day Adventists. In 1898, L. Konrad became head of the European Conference of Adventists. In 1906, Adventist communities were officially recognized in than Russian Empire. All Adventist organizations were liquidated by the Soviet regime in 1931. Ukraine-born leader of the Seventh-day Adventist movement of the Soviet Union Vladimir Shelkov (1895–1980) spent almost all his life from 1931 in imprisonment and died in Yakutia camp.

The Adventist movement renewed its activities in the late 1980s. The currently operating Ukrainian Union Conference (UUC) consists of eight regional conferences. The UUC-SDA has been headed by Volodymyr Krupskyi since 1998. There is an Adventist seminary in Kyiv. Adventists publish two newspapers and four magazines, including the magazine Oznaky chasu (Signs of the time) as the main outlet.

The Adventist church pays special attention to medical and prevention programs: numerous funds are invested to develop a worldwide net of medical centers, educational institutions, sanatoriums, and so on. The Adventist Medical Association of Ukraine involves nearly 700 qualified medical workers. There is also an international medical center in Kyiv with branches in Poltava, Kovel, Lviv and a sanatorium in Mykolaiv.

The Adventist Organization for Help and Development has been presented in Ukraine since 1985. Established by the Adventist church, it is involved in social activities, helps victims of natural disasters and the Chernobyl disaster.

There are also groups of Reformed Adventists, the Advent Christian Church, and the Church of God (Seventh Day) operating in Ukraine.

== Mennonites ==
The first Mennonite colonies appeared on the territory of Ukraine (then in the southwestern part of the Russian Empire) in 1789. The colonists descended from Dutch and mainly Germanic Prussian Anabaptists. Among the earliest settlements were Chortitza on the Dnieper River and Molotschna (now Molochansk), founded in 1803. In 1802, some Mennonite communities moved from Central Europe to Volhynia. Swiss Mennonites of Amish descent from Galicia settled near Dubno in 1815. Other Galician Mennonites lived near Lemberg (Lviv).

After the imperial Russian government announced a russification plan that would end all special privileges by 1880, Mennonites were particularly alarmed at the possibility of losing their exemption from military service and their right to German-language education, which they believed was necessary for maintaining their cultural and religious identity. Between 1874 and 1880, of the approximately 45,000 Mennonites in Ukraine, ten thousand departed for the United States (mostly to California) and eight thousand for Manitoba, Canada.

During the Ukrainian Civil War, a number of Ukrainian Mennonites died at the hands of anarcho-communist makhnovites. During the Soviet period, many Mennonites were persecuted, sent into exile as "kulaks", imprisoned and executed as "enemies of the people", and suffered from hunger and diseases. Between eight and nine thousand Mennonite men were arrested during the Great Terror, which began in autumn 1936 and ended by late 1938.

After the collapse of the USSR, Ukrainian Mennonites renewed their official activities in Ukraine. Various Mennonite businessmen, scientists, scholars, tourism specialists, church and relief workers, and others, have been operating in the country.

== Ukrainian Bible Society ==
The Bible Society in Ukraine began its work in 1815 as a network of several affiliates to Russian Bible Society. After a long period of Soviet regime restrictions, the Ukrainian Bible Society was created in 1991. Among its initiators were the All-Ukrainian Union of Evangelical Christian-Baptist Church, the All-Ukrainian Union of Evangelical Christians (Pentecostal), Ukrainian Greek Catholic Church, Ukrainian Orthodox Church - Kyiv Patriarchate, Seventh-day Adventist Union Conference. Later they were joined by Lutheran community, Ukrainian Autocephalous Orthodox Church, Ukrainian Orthodox Church (Moscow Patriarchate), Roman Catholic Church in Ukraine. The Organization has four branches in Kyiv, Kherson, Kharkiv and Lviv and special department for Bible translation into Ukrainian language.

The Ukrainian Bible Society is an active supporter of the official celebration of the Day of the Bible since 2004, when the Bible Day was celebrated for the first time in Ukraine. In all countries of the world, the Day of the Bible is celebrated on the last Sunday of October.

In 2005, it distributed 174,721 copies of Ukrainian Bibles and 159,626 copies of Ukrainian New Testaments.

== See also ==
- Byzantine Rite Lutheranism
- Evangelical Baptist Union of Ukraine
- Evangelical Presbyterian Church of Ukraine
- History of Christianity in Ukraine
- Ukrainian Lutheran Church
- Transcarpathian Reformed Church
