= Mykolaivka, Mykolaivka rural hromada, Sumy Raion, Sumy Oblast =

Village in Sumy Oblast, Ukraine

Mykolaivka Миколаївка
- Village
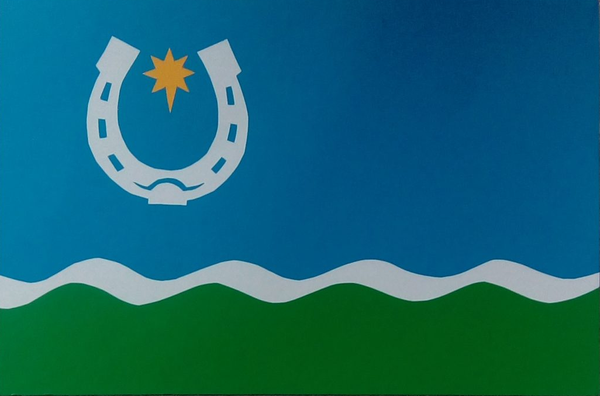
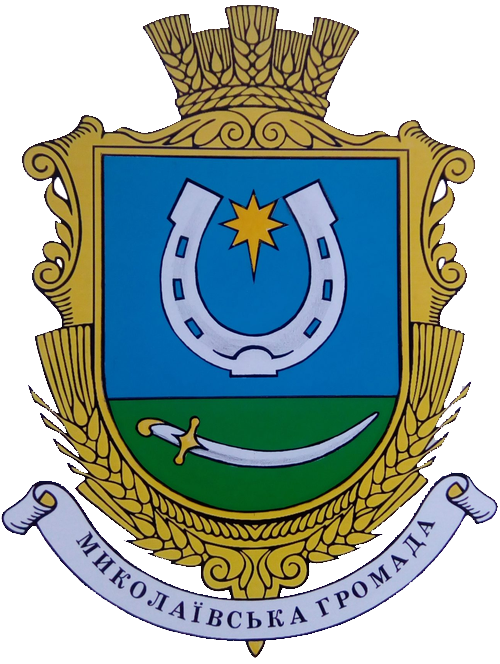
- Flag Coat of arms

- Location of Mykolaivka in Sumy Oblast Location of Mykolaivka in Ukraine
- Coordinates: 51°03′27″N 34°39′45″E
- Country: Ukraine
- Oblast: Sumy Oblast
- Raion: Sumy Raion
- Hromada: Mykolaivka rural hromada
- First mentioned: 1730

Population
  - Total: 957

Mykolaivka (Ukrainian: Миколаївка) is a village in Sumy Raion, Sumy Oblast, central Ukraine. It is the administrative centre of Mykolaivka rural hromada, one of the hromadas of Ukraine. Its population is 957 (as of 2024).

== Overview ==
Mykolaivka was first mentioned in 1730. The Church of the Nativity of the Theotokos (constructed by the Tymchenkov landlord family) and the Kalugin Palace (constructed by the Kalugin landlord family) were both constructed in the 19th century, but were both destroyed during the Russian Revolution.

During the Russian Revolution of 1905 local peasants protested in support of the revolution. The village came under the control of the Red Army in 1918, amidst the Ukrainian–Soviet War. 508 residents of Mykolaivka joined the Red Army during World War II, and 325 died.

In the present day, the religious life of Mykolaivka includes the Orthodox Church of Ukraine and Baptists.

== Notable people ==
- Vira Redlikh, Soviet theatre actress and director.
- Pavlo Skoryk, poet.
- Vadym Stetsenko, soldier of the Armed Forces of Ukraine killed during the War in Donbas.
