= Religious Jews =

Jews who practice and observe Judaism

Religious Jews are Jews who practice and observe Judaism, as opposed to secular Jews and atheist Jews. They may be affiliated with:

Rabininic:

- Orthodox Judaism
  - Haredi Judaism
    - Hasidic Judaism
      - Chabad
    - Misnagdim
    - Sephardic Haredim
  - Religious Zionism
  - Modern Orthodox Judaism
    - Carlebach movement
    - Open Orthodox Judaism
- Conservative Judaism
- Masorti Judaism
- Reconstructionist Judaism
- Reform Judaism
- Jewish Renewal
- Neolog Judaism
- Non-Ashkenazi branches, such as Sephardic Judaism

Non-Rabbinic:

- Karaite Judaism
- Haymanot Judaism
- Jewish Science

== Historical ==
- Elephantine Judaism
- Second Temple Judaism
  - Pharisees
    - House of Hillel
    - House of Shammai
  - Hellenistic Judaism
    - Sadducees
  - Essenes
  - Zealots
    - Sicarii
  - Jewish Christianity
    - Judaizers
      - Nazarenes
      - Ebionites
- Biblists
- Sabbateanism
  - Frankism

== See also ==
- Jewish religious movements
