= Yuri Sipko =

Russian Baptist pastor

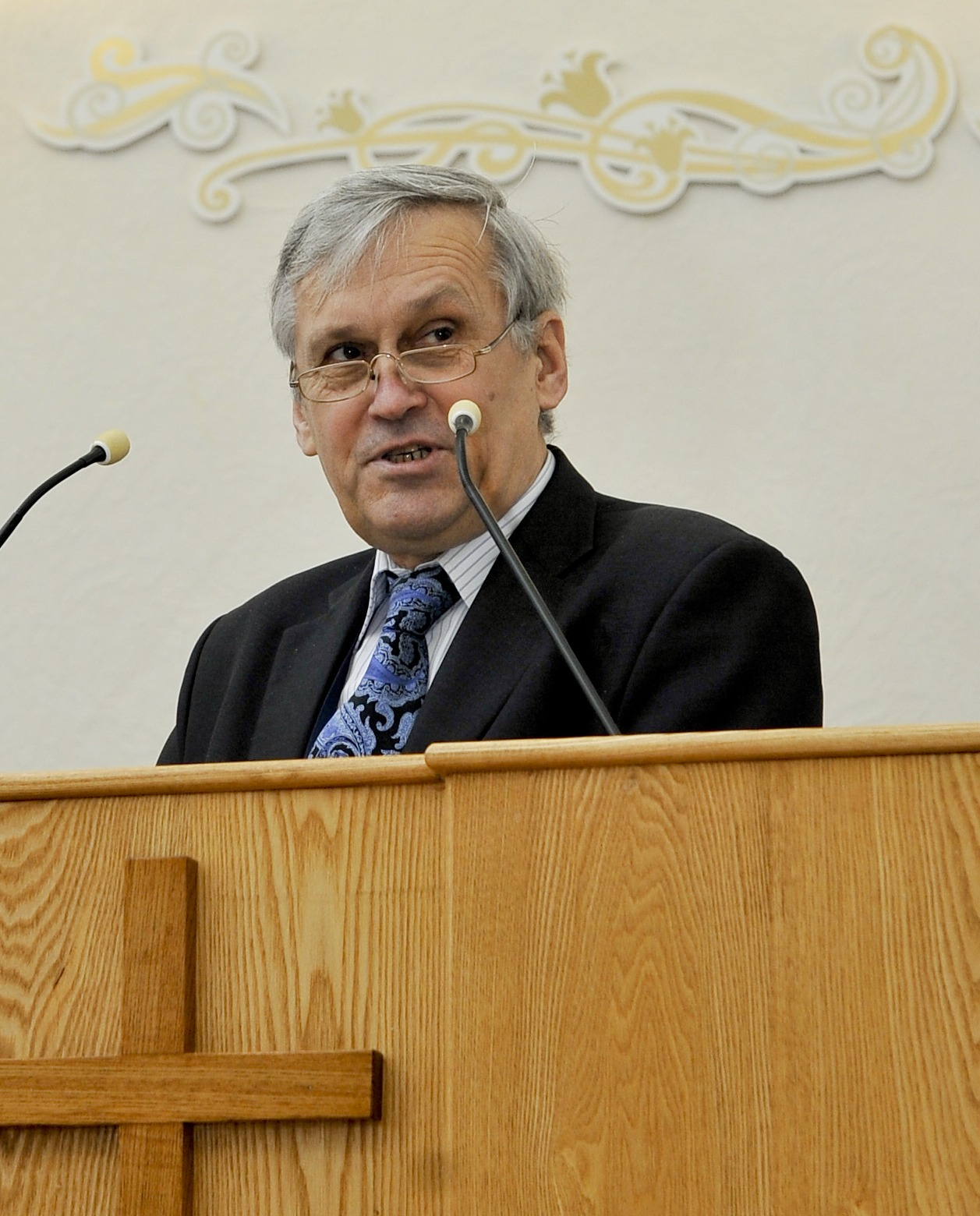
- Sipko in 2013
- Born: Yuri Kirillovich Sipko; February 28, 1952 (age 74); Tara, Omsk Oblast, USSR
- Occupations: Pastor; President of Russian Union of Evangelical Christians-Baptists (2002–2010); Vice-President of World Baptist Alliance
- Years active: 1984–present
- Children: 11
- Religion: Baptists
- Church: Russian Union of Evangelical Christians-Baptists
- Ordained: Deacon (1984); Pastor (1985)
- Writings: Voice of one crying (2013)

Yuri Kirillovich Sipko (Russian: Ю́рий Кири́ллович Сипко́; born 28 February 1952) is a Russian Baptist pastor who was vice president of the World Baptist Alliance and president of the Russian Union of Evangelical Christians-Baptists (UECB) from 2002 to 2010. A criminal case against Sipko was opened on 8 August 2023. He is accused of discrediting the Russian military.

== Early life ==
Sipko was born on 28 February 1952 in the town of Tara in the Omsk Oblast. At age 16 he entered college in Omsk. After graduating four years later, he served in the army and then married and settled in the village of Tabaga in Yakutia. In 1978 his family returned to Omsk and became Baptist. In 1984 he was ordained as a deacon, and in 1985 became a pastor. From 1987 Sipko was the senior pastor of the Omsk and Tyumen regions.

== Senior positions ==
In 1993 Sipko was elected deputy chairman/president of the Russian Union of Evangelical Christians-Baptists, and moved with his family to Moscow. He served for two four-year terms. On 20 March 2002 Sipko was elected chairman of the Russian Union of Evangelical Christians-Baptists, serving for two four-year terms. Since the late 1990s, faced with declining church membership, Sipko actively supported inter-church social projects where Baptists and Pentecostals worked together. In 2007 his organization sponsored an event where evangelists toured by bicycle throughout Russia spreading the word of Christ. In October 2008, during the conflict between Russia and Georgia, he met with his Georgian counterpart to discuss reconciliation. In a joint statement the participants condemned the war between the two countries as "pointless and brutal". He left office on 25 March 2010, replaced by Pastor Alexei Smirnov.

== Official hostility ==
Baptists in Russia face official hostility. In February 2009 Sipko's name was used in fake stories in a Smolensk newspaper claiming to be Baptist but in fact designed to smear the reputation of Baptists. The publishers apparently had links with the government. In April 2009, reacting to appointment of a man known to be hostile to Protestant groups such as the Baptists to the official "Commission for the Implementation of State Expertise on Religious Science", Sipko stated that the government had been involved in a concerted, long-term effort to greatly restrict the freedom of religion in Russia. In November 2009, commenting on proposed legislation to restrict missionary activity in Russia, he said "Practically all believers will become susceptible to penal sanction".
