= Union of Slavic Churches of Evangelical Christians and Slavic Baptists of Canada =

Canadian religious charitable organization

The Union of Slavic Churches of Evangelical Christians and Slavic Baptists of Canada is a religious and charitable organization. It was incorporated in 1963 and is headquartered in Toronto, Ontario, Canada. In 1995, the Union had about 500 members in 11 churches.

According to the Canada Revenue Agency, the organization's ongoing programs are providing spiritual and financial support to Slavic Baptist churches and running a summer camp.

== See also ==
- Fellowship of Evangelical Baptist Churches in Canada
- Ukrainian Evangelical Baptist Convention of Canada
