= Embassy of the Blessed Kingdom of God for All Nations =

- Embassy of the Blessed Kingdom of God for All Nations
- 50.39756°N 30.60209°E
- Location: Kyiv
- Country: Ukraine
- Denomination: Evangelical Christian Charismatic
- Website: godembassy.org

History
- Founded: 1994
- Founder: Sunday Adelaja

Embassy of the Blessed Kingdom of God for All Nations (also known as Embassy of God) is an Evangelical Christian Charismatic megachurch, denomination, and parachurch organization headquartered in Kyiv, Ukraine. The senior pastor is Sunday Adelaja.

== History ==
In 1993, the church began with Pastor Sunday Adelaja and 7 people in an apartment.

The church was officially founded in 1994 as the "World of Faith Bible Church". In 2002, the church changed her name to "Embassy of the Blessed Kingdom of God for All Nations".

In 2008, the church opened 20 churches in Ukraine and 18 in the world.

In 2013, the church claimed 25,000 members in Kyiv, 100,000 members in Ukraine, 1,000 churches in the World.

== Social programs ==
Homeless people are served food in the Stephania Soup Kitchen, run by the Embassy of God.

Thousands of people are fed daily through soup kitchens in Kyiv. The church also has a program for helping homeless people acquiring skills, thus helping them back to a normal life and work. According to the church, 2,000 children have been helped off the street, and have been returned to their families. Furthermore, the church runs a 24-hour hot-line, named "Trust line", for people to call in need. The church also works with addicted people and has a program helping addicted people to be set free from various addictions. The main organization is called "Love Rehabilitation Center". According to the church, more than 5000 drug and alcohol addicted people have been set free from their addiction through their work.

== Schools ==
There are many educational institutions connected to the church, and among them the following are more known: the Joshua Missionary Bible Institute in Ukraine, the Center of Restoration of Personality and Transformation of the Society in Ukraine, the History Makers Bible School in the US, the UK, Germany, France, and the Institute for National Transformation in Nigeria.

== Criticisms ==
In December 2008, nine leaders of Ukrainian evangelical church associations signed a statement calling for repentance on Sunday Adelaja and his ministry. The latter accuse him of promoting a cult of personality, self-promotion, exaggerating his successes, teaching the Prosperity theology, cursing the members of the 'church who do not agree with him.

In 2009, the church's reputation also suffered after members were implicated in a financial fraud case: King's Capital, a financial group led by a former member of his congregation, promised as much as 60 percent returns on investments and drew many of its investors from the church. Later, several former church members went to the authorities claiming they were unable to recover the money they invested, which left many of them bankrupt. Police later arrested Aleksandr Bandurchenko, a church member and one of King Capital's leaders, on suspicion of fraud.

In March 2016, the Russian Union of Christians of Evangelical Faith announced in a press release that Adelaja was in recovery after confessing before a conference of pastors to adultery with women in the church. The pastor denied the affair, citing an attempt by pastors to take his place and not having been to Russia for 10 years.

== See also ==
- Pentecostalism in Ukraine
- List of the largest evangelical churches
- List of the largest evangelical church auditoriums
