= Baptists in Ukraine =

Protestant denomination in Ukraine

The Baptist Church in Ukraine (Ukrainian: Баптизм в Україні; Baptyzm v Ukrayini) is one of the oldest and most widespread denominations Evangelical Christian in the country. Before the fall of the Soviet Union, over half the 1.5 million acknowledged Baptists and Pentecostals in the USSR lived in Soviet Ukraine. Prior to its independence in 1991, Ukraine was home to the second largest Baptist community in the world, after the United States, and was called the "Bible Belt" of the Soviet Union.

== History ==
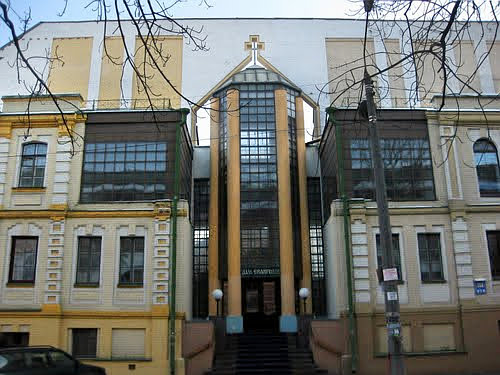
The House of Gospel in Kyiv, the central church of the AUС EСB.

The predecessors of today's Baptists, the Anabaptists, came to Ukraine in the 16th century, seeking refuge from their persecution by state churches in the Holy Roman Empire, and other European states. They were later followed by the German Mennonites and Baptists. They sought to spread their faith to the native Ruthenian/Ukrainian population, so Slavs were invited to Anabaptist prayer meetings and Bible studies.

The first Baptist baptism (or "baptism by faith" of adult people) in Ukraine took place in 1864 on the river Inhul in the Yelizavetgrad region (now Kropyvnytskyi region), in a German settlement. In 1867, the first Ukrainian-speaking Baptist communities were organized in that area. From there, the denomination spread to the south of Ukraine and then to other regions as well. One of the first Baptist communities was registered in Kyiv in 1907, and in 1908 the First All-Russian Convention of Baptists was held there, gathering believers from all over the Russian Empire. At the end of the 19th century, it was estimated that there were from 100,000 to 300,000 Baptists in Ukraine. At the start of the twentieth century, Evangelical Christians and Baptists started working more closely with each other. At congresses in Poland in 1920 and 1923, they tried to sort out differences in doctrine and practice, which helped them move toward eventual unification. These differences were rooted in their theology, with Baptists influenced by Calvinist ideas about providence and Evangelical Christians emphasizing the Arminian belief in free will.

=== Persecution ===
During the 1920s, Evangelical Christians and Baptists were prohibited in the Ukrainian SSR; they were, to some extent, revived during and after World War II in a Soviet effort to weaken the cultural influence of the Russian Orthodox Church. During the early 20th century, Soviet authorities attempted to use the religious influence of Protestant communities to raise morale, promote military service, and encourage support for the defense of the state. In 1944, an All-Union meeting was held in Moscow, with 45 delegates in attendance, during which Baptists and Evangelical Christians united in the Church of Evangelical Christian Baptists (ECB). This unification was influenced by several historical factors, including earlier efforts to reconcile doctrinal differences between the groups, and broader political conditions affecting Protestant communities during the Second World War. Other smaller Baptist and Evangelical groups later joined the ECB.

At the end of the 1950s, 75% of the believers of the All-USSR Council of ECB lived in Ukraine. However, from the 1960s to the 1980s, Soviet authorities intensified pressure on Baptist communities through a range of repressive actions, including the closure of prayer houses, refusal of bureaucrats to officially register congregations, confiscation of religious literature, and disruption of worship services. Believers were frequently subjected to fines, administrative arrests and, in many cases, criminal prosecution leading to imprisonment or exile. Between 1961 and 1964 alone, 1,234 individuals across the USSR were criminally convicted on religious grounds. Despite these restrictions, Baptist communities continued to organize and even engage in public acts of resistance, such as protests highlighting violations of religious freedom. Baptists in Ukraine experienced a revival in the 1970s, and are now among the most active Christian denominations in the country.

Under the 1996 Constitution of Ukraine, Ukrainians were given the right to free practice of religion. Immediately after the Orange Revolution, the Baptists, as a minority and non-traditional religion, were subject to persecution and discrimination, including being arrested; and Baptists had difficulties with local government authorities in Kyiv and other large cities while attempting to obtain land and building permits. However, the national government of Ukraine did help facilitate the building of houses of worship. Also in 2005, Baptist leaders criticized the Ukrainian Orthodox Church (Moscow Patriarchate) (UOC-MP) for continuing to refer publicly to Baptists with the pejorative Ukrainian word sectanty ('sectarians'), and criticized the UOC-MP in 2006 for the activities of the group Dialogue, which Baptists and human rights groups characterized as a front for the UOC-MP to promote hostility toward non-Orthodox Christians.

=== Migration to North America ===
In the 1960s, 1970s and 1980s, some Baptists (as well as other Protestant groups from Ukraine) emigrated to the United States and Canada. After the collapse of the USSR, migration and interaction with Western churches increased. At present, there are large Ukrainian Baptist communities in Sacramento and Philadelphia.

== Organization ==
Baptists in Ukraine are organized and active in building churches and seminary education. It is estimated that there are more Baptists in Ukraine than in all the CIS countries (including Russia) combined.

Baptists organized the first International Christian Theater Festival in Rivne, which took place in July 2007.

The Baptist church in Ukraine has attracted many young people, and there are now over 20,000 young people enrolled in Baptist universities. Many of these youths are taking part in evangelism and ministry. A spokesperson for the Southern Baptist International Mission Board has said that "[in Ukraine] the new generation is what God will have to use to evangelize, disciple and train leaders."

=== All-Ukrainian Union of Churches of Evangelical Christian Baptists ===
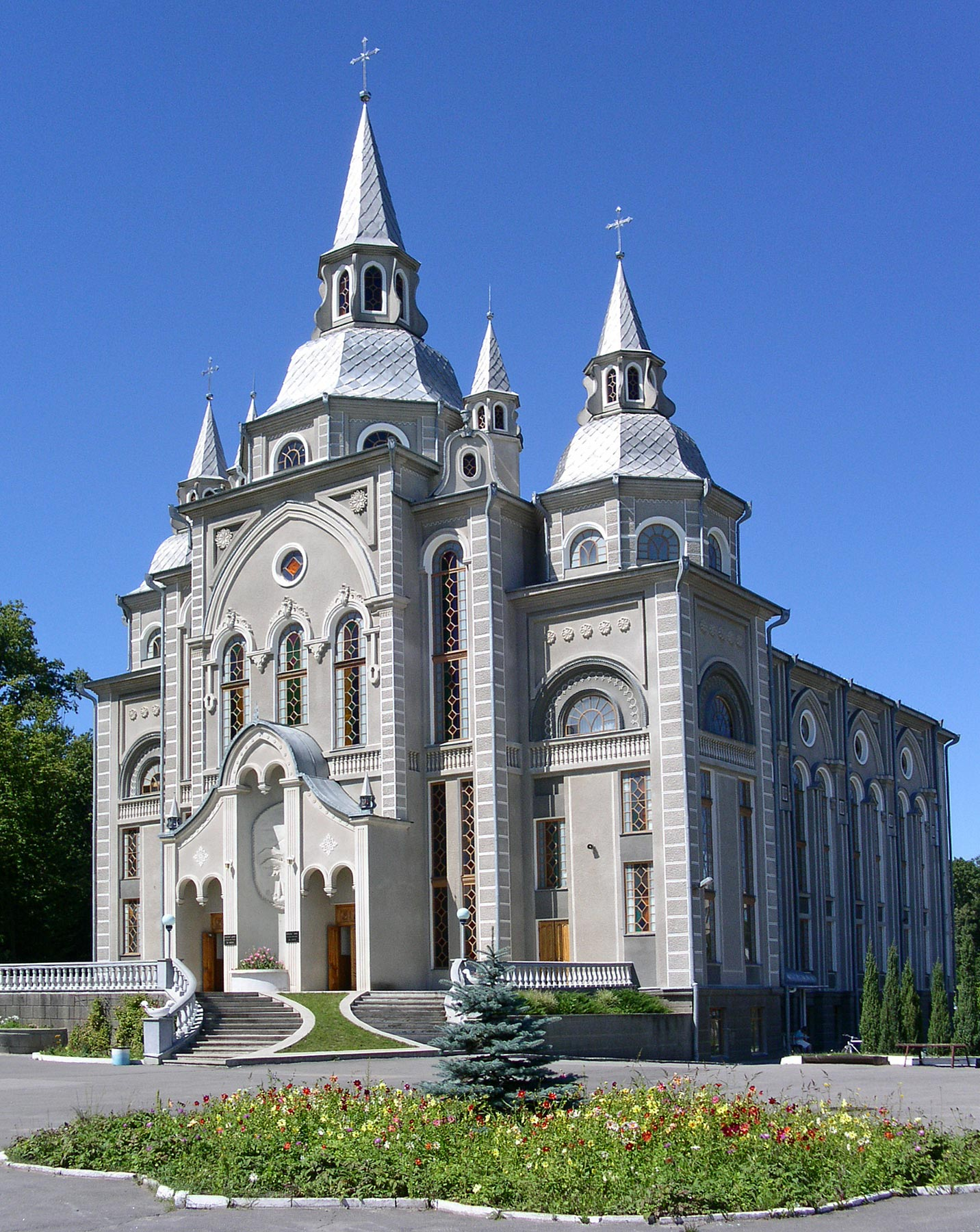
The House of Gospel in Vinnytsia was opened in 1996 and is one of the largest Baptist churches in Ukraine.

Nearly 90% of Baptists in Ukraine are united in the All-Ukrainian Union of Churches of Evangelical Christian-Baptists (AUС EСB), established in 1994 at the 22nd Convention of the ECB of Ukraine. According to a denomination census released in 2023, it claimed 2,192 churches and 105,189 members. It has 7 affiliated theological institutes. The union is engaged in publishing activity and has an extended mass media network. The AUС EСB is governed by a council composed of senior presbyters (bishops) of regional associations headed by the president of the council. From 1990–2006 the council was headed by Hryhorii Komendant. From May 2006 it has been headed by Vyacheslav Nesteruk. The union closely cooperates with Ukrainian Baptists in the diaspora. The AUС EСB is a member of the European Baptist Federation and the Baptist World Alliance.

== Korean Baptists ==
Beginning in 1993, the Korean Baptist Church has existed in Ukraine. As a religious organization, its focus is towards the Korean diaspora in Ukraine. Generally the preachers are Americans of Korean descent.

== See also ==
- Brotherhood of Independent Baptist Churches and Ministries of Ukraine
- Evangelical Baptist Union of Ukraine
- Protestantism in Ukraine
- Ukrainian Evangelical Baptist Convention of Canada
- Union of Evangelical Christians-Baptists of Russia
