= Evangelical Russian Church =

- Евангелическая Русская Церковь
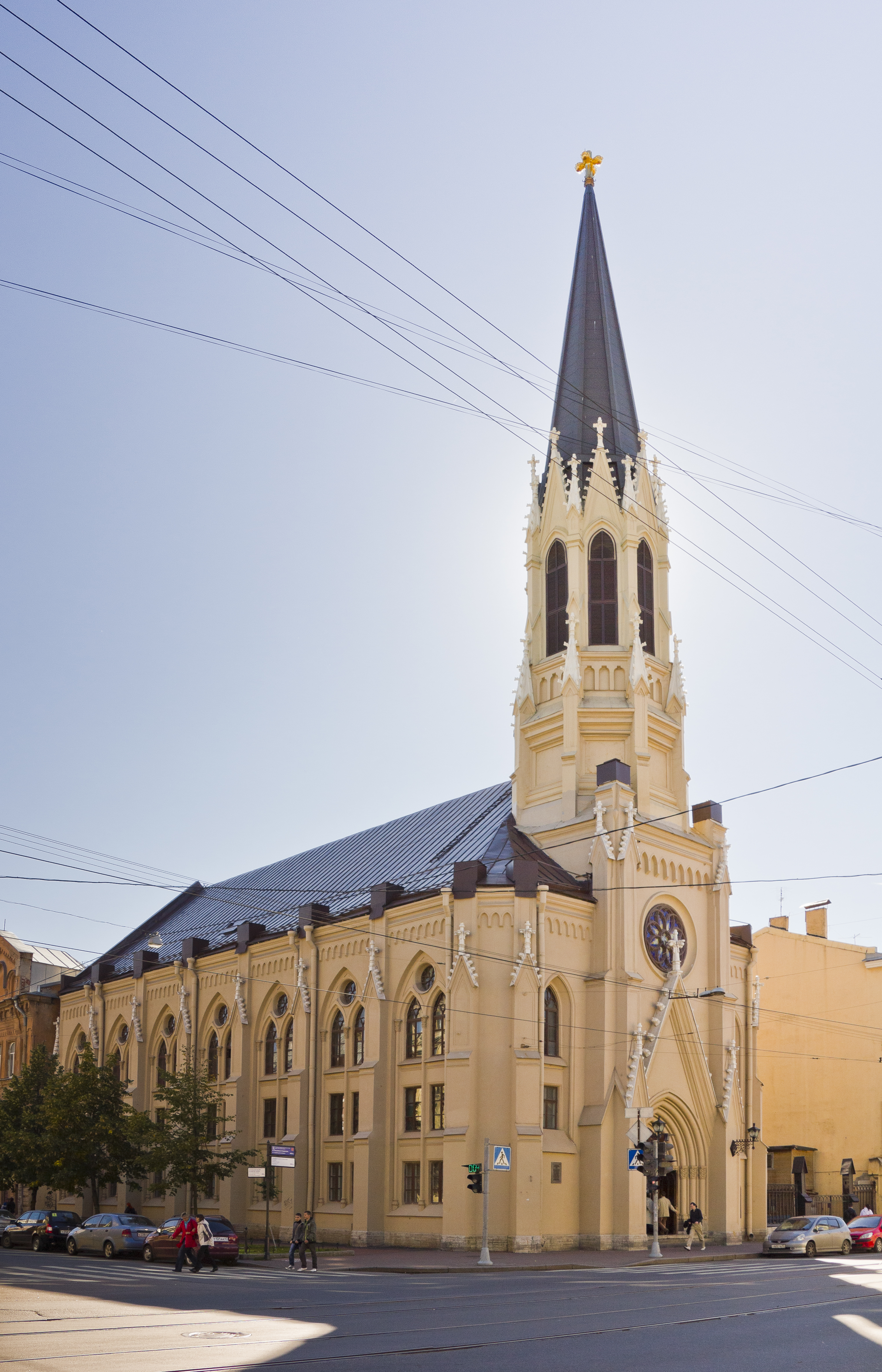
- Abbreviation: ЕРЦ
- Type: Eastern Christianity
- Classification: Eastern Protestant
- Orientation: Evangelicalism (with Eastern Orthodoxy, Baptist Christianity, Catholicism, Lutheranism and Anglicanism influences)
- Scripture: Bible
- Theology: Prima scriptura
- Polity: Congregationalist
- Presbyter: Sergey Stepuchov (since 2003); Yevgeny Nedzelsky (1990–2003)
- Region: Saint Petersburg, Russia (since 1991) (Russian Soviet Federative Socialist Republic) RSFSR (1990–1991)
- Language: Russian
- Headquarters: 199004, Sredny Avenue Vasilyevsky Ostrov 18B, Saint Petersburg, Russia
- Founder: E. N. Nedzelsky
- Origin: December 1990; Saint Petersburg
- Separated from: Russian Union of Evangelical Christians-Baptists (1990)
- Congregations: several (initially); 1 (now)
- Members: 1,000 members (initially); 600 members (in 2000); 400 members (in 2002); 100 members (in 2003) more than 100 members (in 2004)
- Tax status: Local religious organization

The Evangelical Russian Church (Russian: Евангелическая Русская Церковь; ЕРЦ) is an Evangelical church in Saint Petersburg, Russia.

== History ==
It was founded in Leningrad by E. N. Nedzelsky, who, together with a group of adherents separated from the Evangelical Christians-Baptist community on Poklonnaya Hill. The first service was held in December 1990. The denomination sought to combine Protestantism (where preaching and community life are central) with the traditions of Russian spirituality and elements of Orthodox liturgy. Distinctive features of the Evangelical Russian Church's services include the wearing of vestments by the clergy, the use of candles and icons, and the singing of Orthodox hymns.

From 1993 to 2003, the Church operated Radio Teos. During this period, the station broadcast from St. Petersburg on medium wave, covering Moscow at 1134 kHz and St. Petersburg at 1089 kHz. Addtionally, from 1998 to 1999, Church pastors hosted the television program Мы говорим о вечном... (We are talking about the eternal...) on the regional cable channel Петроний (Petronius). The political party Союз христианского созидания (Christian Union for Edification), created on the initiative of Nedzelsky in 1995, was affiliated with the Church. In the 1995 Russian legislative election, the party nominated one candidate in the Eastern constituency, but he failed to win. In the 1996 Russian presidential election, the party supported Yeltsin's candidacy and campaigned for him.

Although founded as an ecumenical organization, it criticizes various new religious movements (e.g., Jehovah's Witnesses, Mormons, Scientology, and the Theotokos Center) for distorting fundamental Christian doctrines.

According to some sources, at the turn of the century it was the largest community of evangelical Christians in St. Petersburg.

The Evangelical Russian Church has never had own premises. Throughout it history, services have been held in various locations:

- 1990–1991: Znanie Cinema Hall
- 1991–1994: Railway Workers' Palace of Culture (demolished in 1996)
- 1994–1995: Felix Dzerzhinsky Palace of Culture Militsiya
- 1995–?: Maksim Cinema Hall
- In 2002: Ilyich House of Culture
- 2009–2012: The Church of Evangelical Christians in the Spirit of the Apostles
- Since 2012: St. Michael's Church (services held every Sunday).

== Sexual abuse ==
In 2003, allegations of sexual abuse by Nedzelsky against female parishioners emerged. This led to his resignation as a presbyter of the Church. He was subsequently excommunicated after selling Radio Teos to the Christian Broadcasting Association Radiotserkov for several hundred thousand US dollars. Nedzelsky appropriated all the proceeds for himself, leaving the community with nothing. After Nedzelsky's expulsion, the Church's activities sharply declined.
