= Brotherhood of Independent Baptist Churches and Ministries of Ukraine =

Ukrainian Christian denomination

The Brotherhood of Independent Baptist Churches and Ministries of Ukraine (Ukrainian: Братство незалежних церков і місій євангельських християн-баптистів) is a Baptist Christian denomination that was officially founded and registered in Ukraine in 1993.

== Structure ==
The foundation of this new Baptist Union was organized and initiated by a group of churches, which for nearly thirty years had been active members of the Union of Churches movement. Among these churches-initiators there were churches of the Union of Baptist Churches in Kyiv, Zhytomyr, Khartsyzk, Kharkiv, Rivne, Zdolbuniv, etc. Today, the Brotherhood includes more than 100 communities and about 11,000 members.

== See also ==
- Baptists in Ukraine
- Evangelical Baptist Union of Ukraine
- List of Baptist denominations
- Ukrainian Evangelical Baptist Convention of Canada
