= Lutheran Church of Saint Michael =

Church in Russia

- Russian: Лютеранская Церковь Святого Михаила
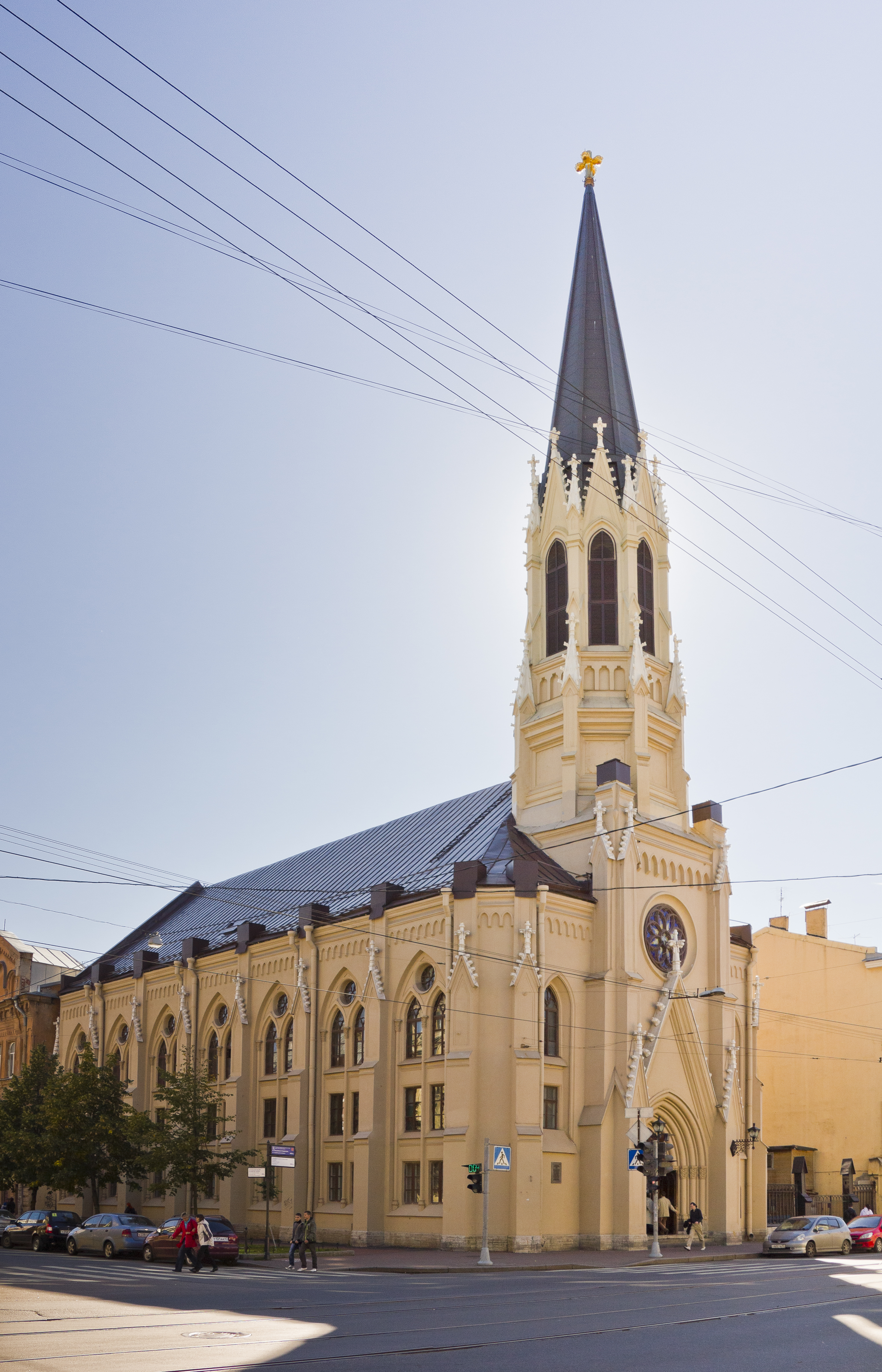

Religion
- Affiliation: Lutheran
- Governing body: Evangelical Lutheran Church of Ingria
- Status: Active

Location
- Location: Sredny Avenue Vasilyevsky Ostrov 18B, Saint Petersburg, Russia
- Interactive map of Lutheran Church of Saint Michael

Architecture
- Architect: Karl Bulmerincq
- Style: Neo-Gothic
- Completed: 1876

Website
- https://spbstmihail.jimdofree.com/

The Lutheran Church of Saint Michael (Russian: Лютера́нская це́рковь свято́го Михаи́ла, romanized: Ljuteranskaja tserkov svjatogo Mihaila) is an Evangelical Lutheran church in St. Petersburg. Since 1992, it has been an active parish of the Church of Ingria.

== History ==
The church community appeared in 1731 in the building of the First Cadet Corps. In 1834, the community was named in the name of Archangel Michael. In 1841, Emperor Nicholas I ordered the church to be transferred to a private building, but ordered that funds be paid to the parish from the treasury there. Then the division of the single community into German and Estonian took place. Formally, the Estonian parish was organized in May 1842, parish members rented a house for meetings using government money. The Estonian community organized the Church of St. John. The German community (about 2,000 parishioners) gathered in a private house on the 3rd line of Vasilyevsky Island, where on 16 August 1842 the Church of St. Michael the Archangel was consecrated. Since the building could not accommodate all the parishioners, after the reconstruction of the cadet school building, a Lutheran church was reopened there, consecrated on 8 November 1847. Until 1861, the church on Vasilyevsky Island and the cadet school consisted of one parish. Since 1861, the church at the cadet school received permission to create its own parish, which since 1866 was called the "Church of St. Michael on the Cadet Line.”

Meanwhile, parishioners of the church on Vasilyevsky Island were raising funds for the construction of a new church, which was founded on 23 October 1874 on Sredny Avenue on Vasilyevsky Island. The church was consecrated on 19 December 1876. In connection with the consecration of the new building, the parish at the cadet school was abolished by imperial decision, and the parishioners and property were transferred to the building on Vasilievsky Island.The church operated an elementary school with an orphanage, as well as a widow's shelter and a society for the care of the poor.

In 1929, the Soviet authorities transferred the building of the Church of St. Michael to the Russian Lutheran community of Jesus Christ, as a result of which the German and Russian parishes merged. In 1935, the church was closed by decree of the Leningrad Regional Executive Committee on 15 August of the same year. The sports base of the Kalinin plant was located in the temple building, after which its place was taken by the warehouse of the Uritsky tobacco factory, and after the Second World War – by the workshop of the experimental plant "Sport". The new owners completely rebuilt the interior, while the main worship hall was divided into three floors by ceilings.

== Modernity ==
In 1992, the building was transferred to the Church of Ingria, church services were resumed. The parish of the Church of St. Michael is predominantly Russian. Russian is the main language at Masses. In the revival of the parish, its rector, Sergei Preyman, played a huge role, who was at the same time an episcopal vicar and the head of the Russian probate of ELTSIR (an ethnic faction within the Church of Ingria). After the sudden death of Fr. Sergei Preiman The Russian probate was reorganized and the parish became part of the St. Petersburg probate. He also heads the St. Petersburg probate of ELTSIR. Currently, the church territory is provided for worship by other Protestant denominations: the Evangelical Russian Church, Methodists, Seventh-day Adventists, the Vineyard and Calvary Chapel churches.

== Architecture ==
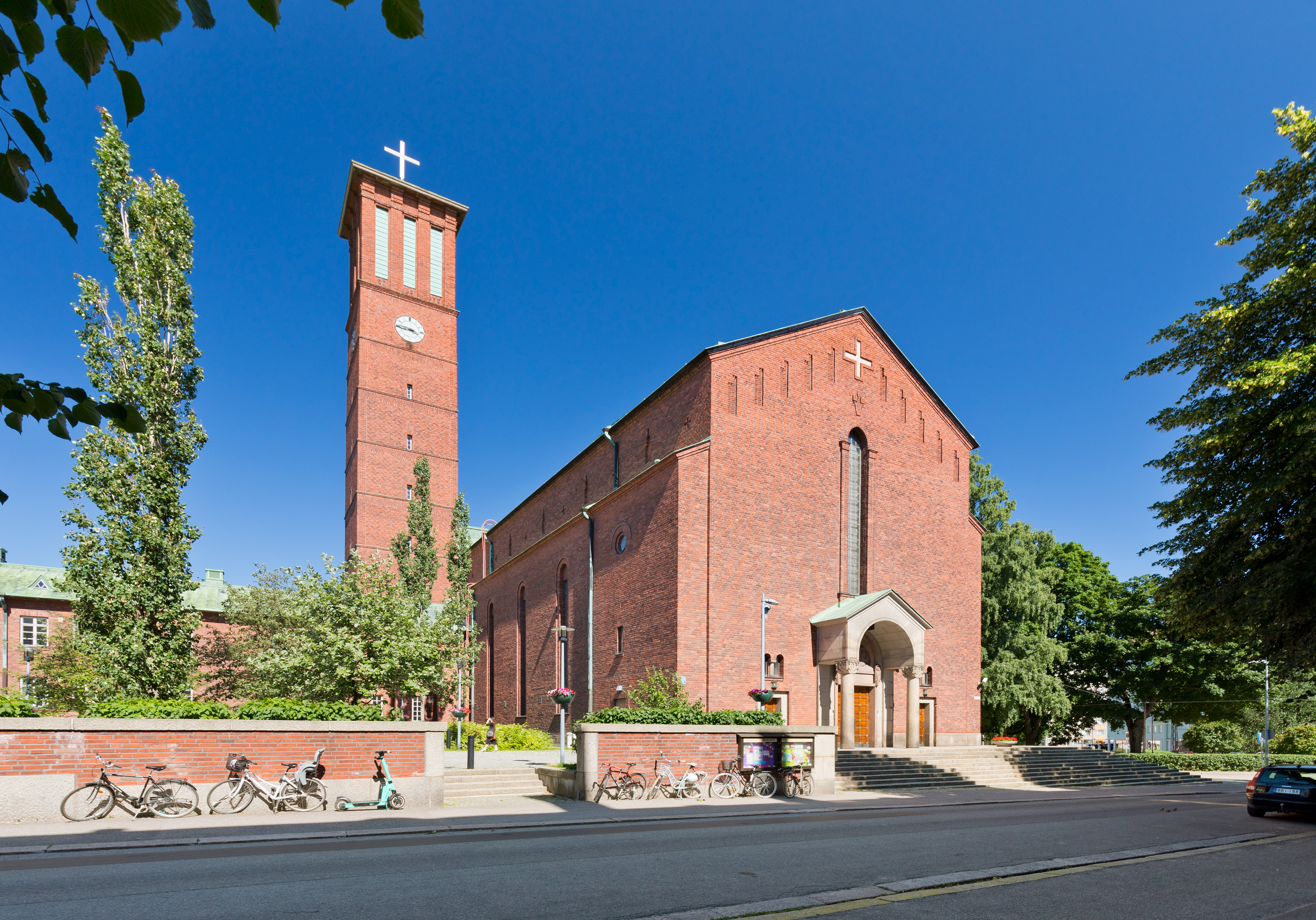
St. Paul's Lutheran Church in Helsinki, whose congregation donated an organ to St. Michael's Church in St. Petersburg

A stone church with 800 seats, built in 1871–1876, according to the design of the military engineer, Colonel Karl Bulmerincq. The facade was rebuilt in 1886 according to the design of the architect Rudolf Bernhard. The church was built in the neo-Gothic style. The building is crowned with a pointed tent on a high tholobate, decorated with Gothic lancet windows and pinnacle turrets. The walls are lined with sandstone. The church had a Sauer organ, which operated from 1877 to 1935.

The building survived after a long time of closure. Restoration has been carried out since 2002, which was completed in 2010. In 2012, the parish of St. Michael's Church was given an organ from the Austrian company Rieger Orgelbau, manufactured in 1956 and belonging to the Lutheran Church of St. Paul in Helsinki, Finland. The instrument was commissioned in 2015, after which it was consecrated by Bishop Arri Kugappi on 3 January 2016.

During the restoration process and later, the building was decorated with stained glass, which were initially missing, since in the 19th century the parish of St. Michael's Church was one of the poorest in the St. Petersburg and could not afford stained glass.

However, the cast-iron decor of the building's facades has not been completely restored, since some of the elements were lost during Soviet times due to dilapidation and lack of repair, and some – the finials of the side facades and the cast-iron parapet – were recognized as unsafe, removed and stored until the time when funds for their restoration become available. В As a result, the roof lacks pinnacles and Gothic grilles.

== Pastors who served in the parish ==
- Tobias Plasching (1732—1747)
- Hilarius Hartmann Henning (1747—1792)
- Ludwig Jeremias Hoffmann (1794—1801)
- Heinrich Conrad Heinemeyer (1801—1803)
- August Friedrich Hirscfeld (1803—1829)
- Carl Friedrich Rosental (1823—1827)
- David Flitner (1830—1859)
- Adolf Stierin (1859—1860)
- Karl Masing (1860—1878)
- Paul von Loesch (1869—1877)
- Guido Pingoud (1878—1914)
- Karl Beldan (1903—1908)
- Eugen Deggeler (1908—1915)
- Karl Bush (1913—1918)
- Vladimir Blaginin (1992—1993)
- Sergei Preyman (1993—2003)
- Sergey Tatarenko (since 2003)

== Gallery ==
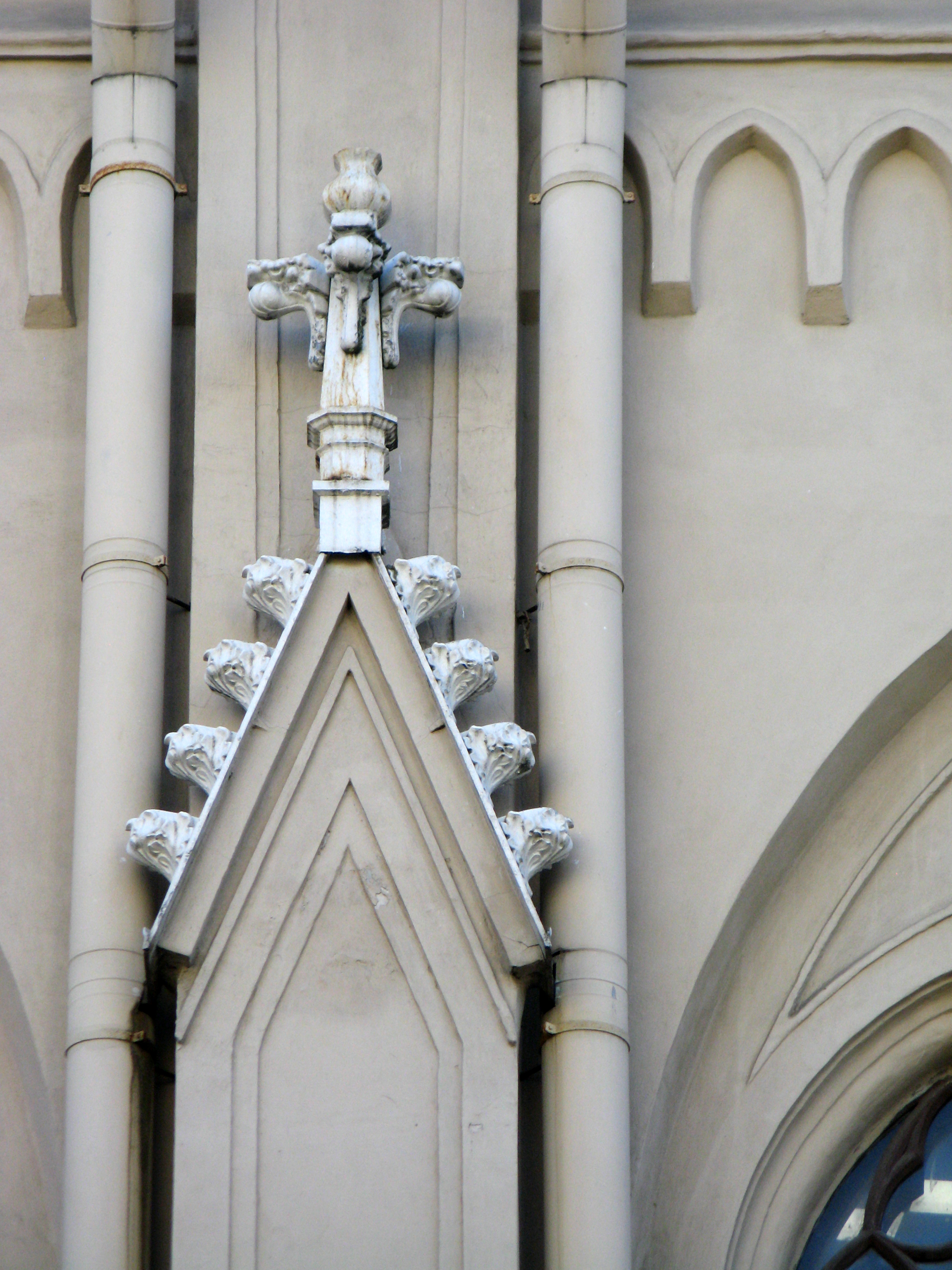

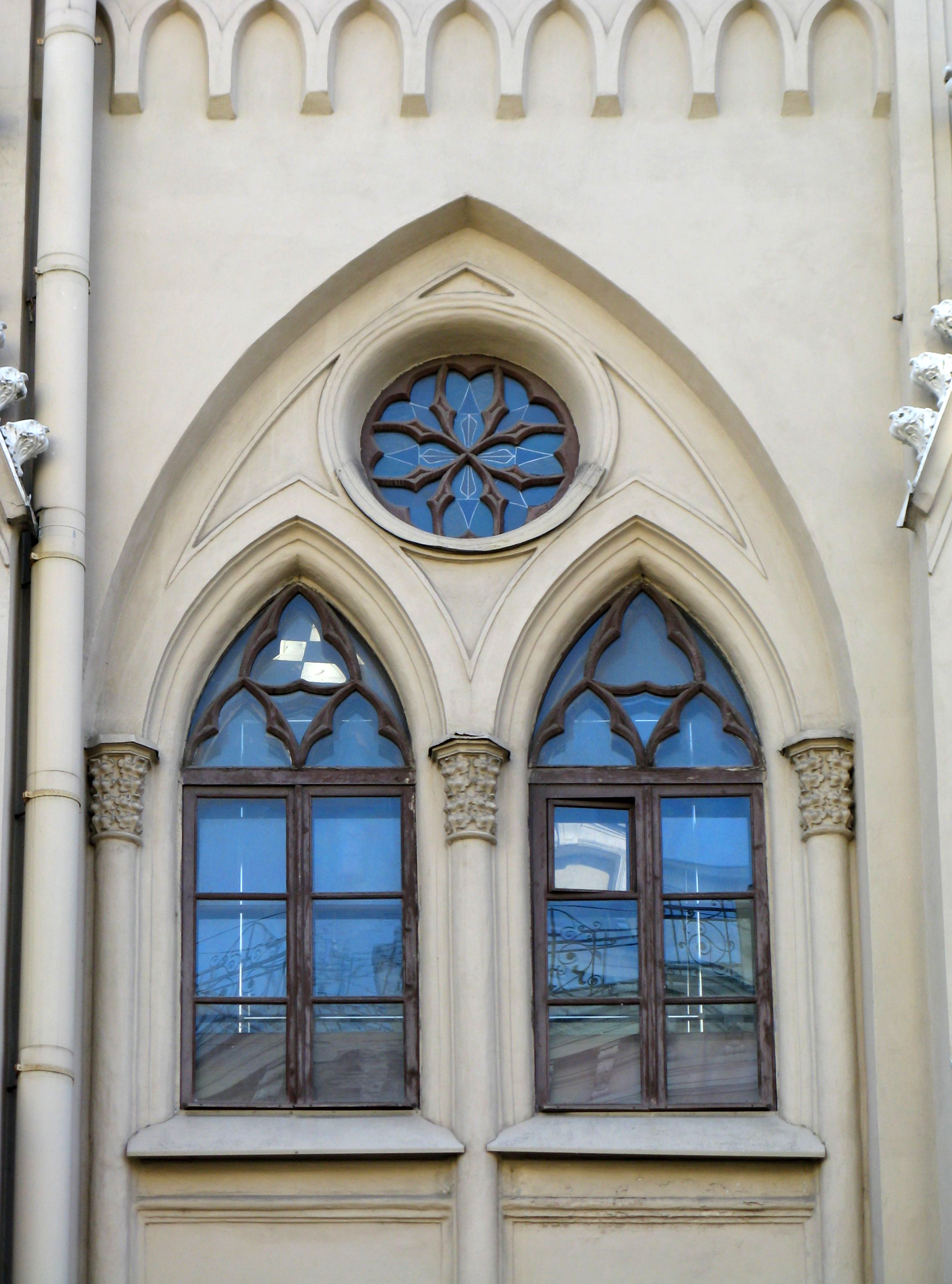

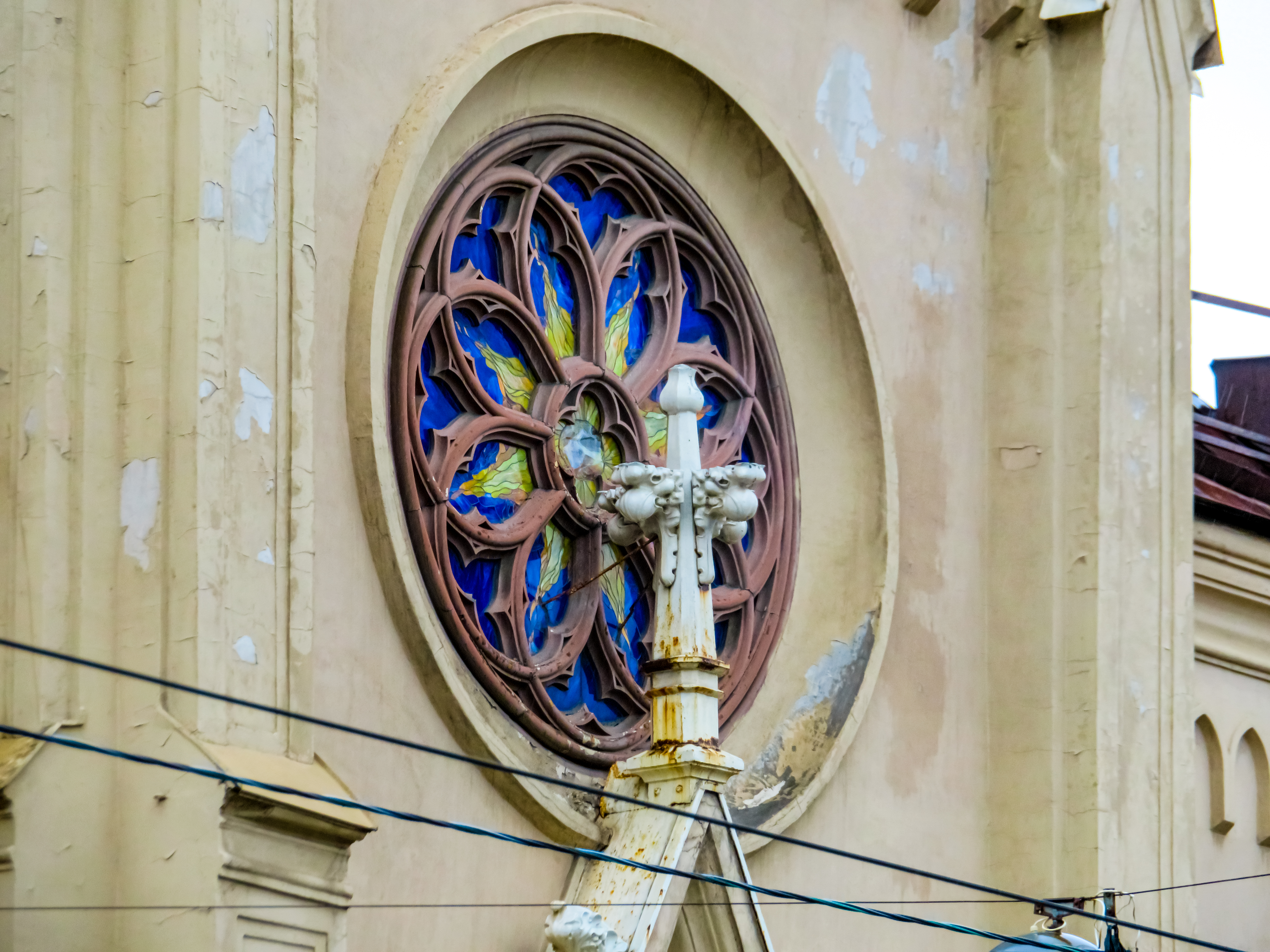

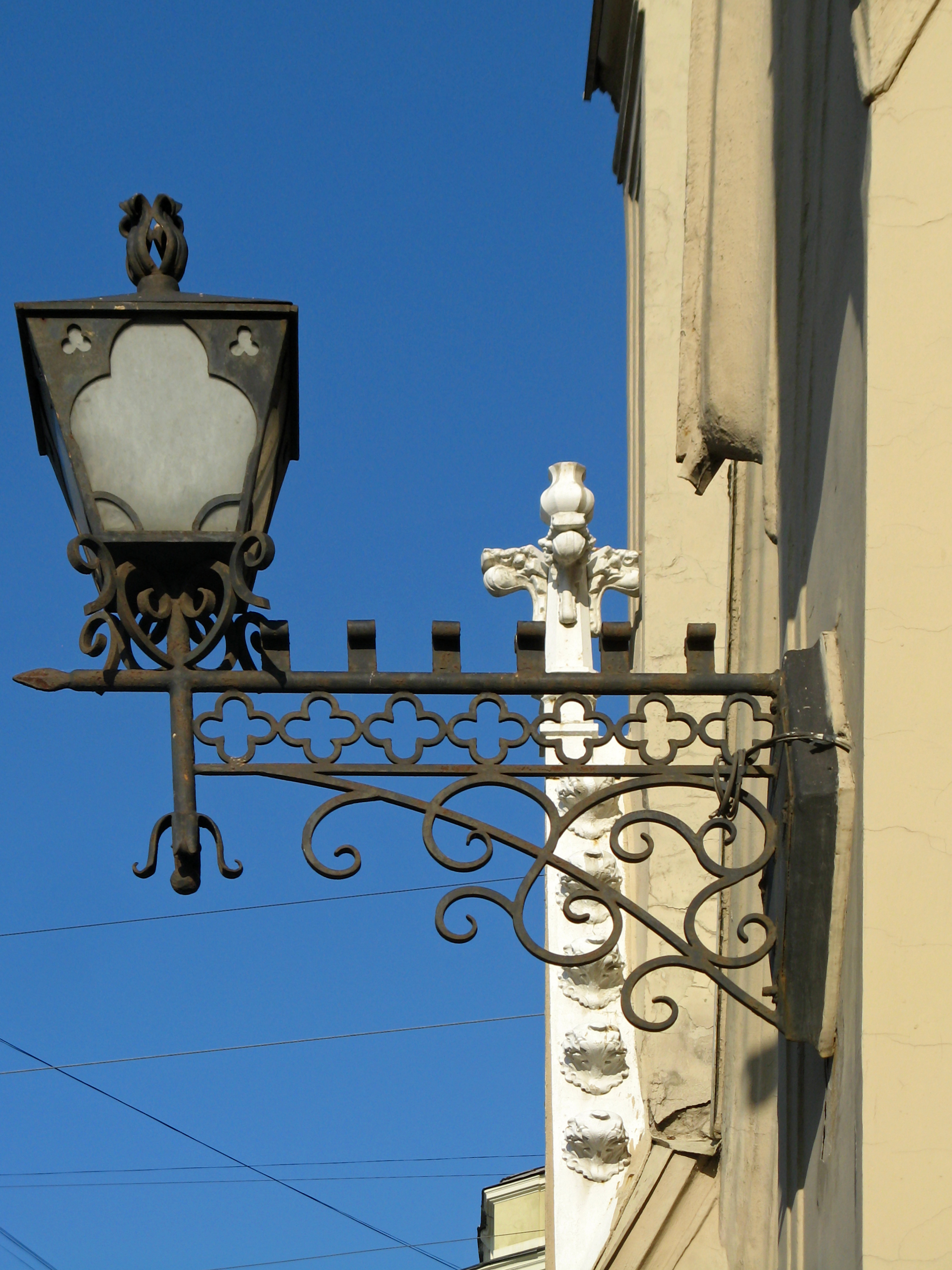

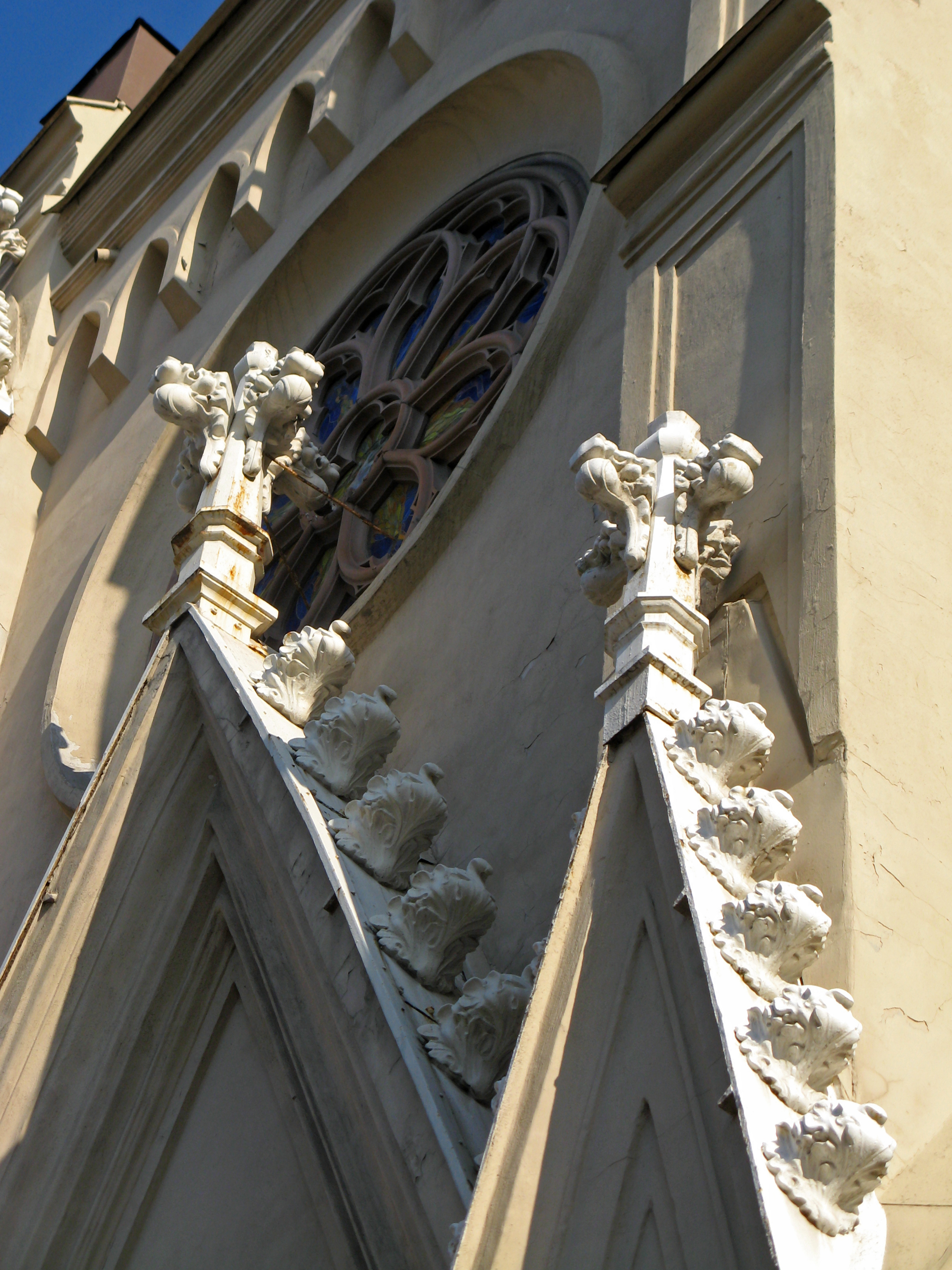
