= St. Paul's Church, Helsinki =

Lutheran church in Helsinki, Finland

Coordinates: 60.1974°N 24.9601°E

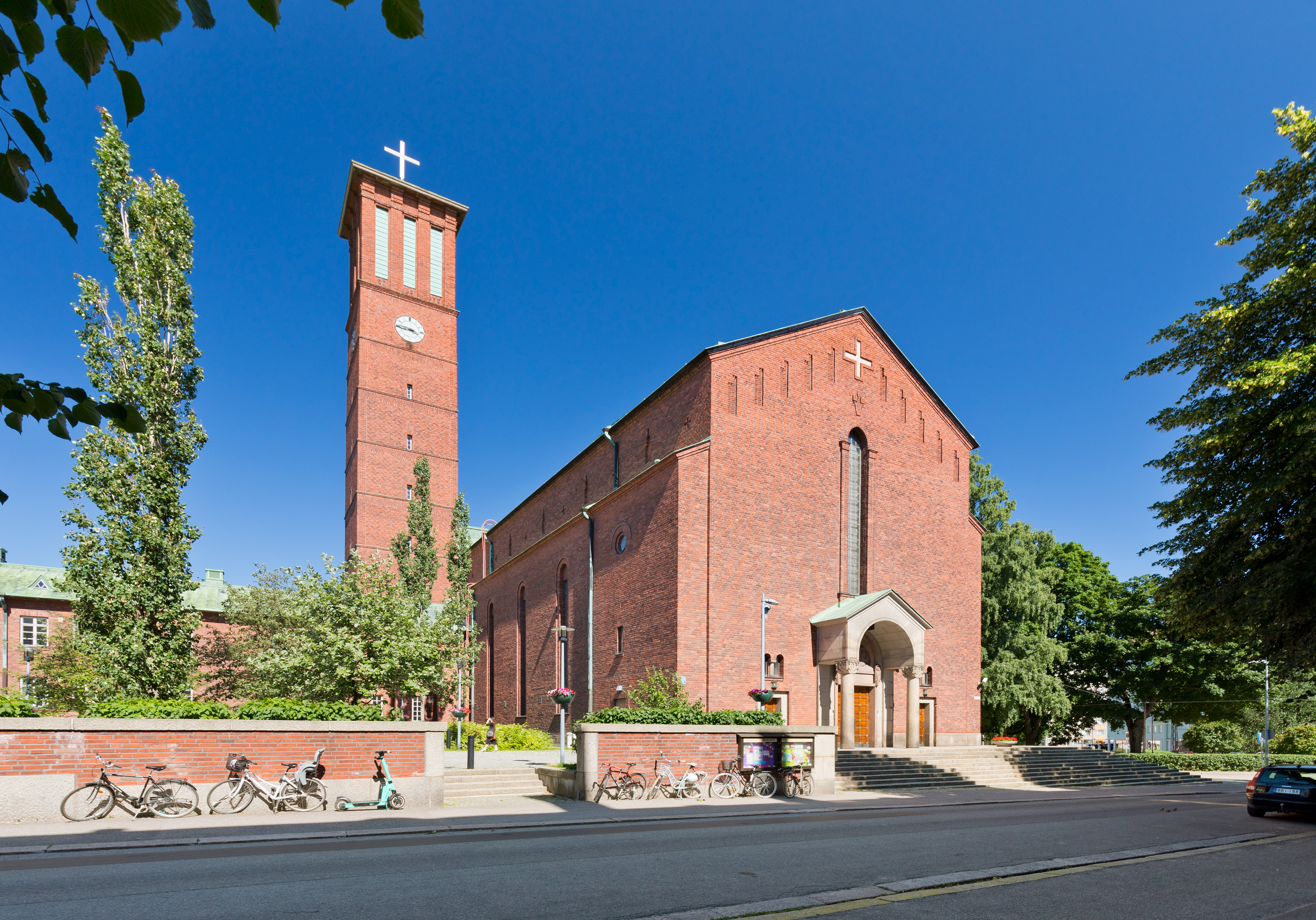
St. Paul's Church in Vallila, Helsinki

St. Paul's Church (Finnish: Paavalinkirkko, Swedish: Paulus kyrka) is a Lutheran church located in the Vallila neighborhood of Helsinki, Finland. The red brick church, named after Paul the Apostle, was designed by Bertel Liljequist and it was completed in 1930. The church was officially dedicated in March 1931. The church hall has 800 seats.

After its completion, the church was once even called the "most beautiful church in Helsinki". The church was somewhat damaged by the bombing of Helsinki during the Winter War, and traces can still be seen on one wall and on the pillars of the main door. The church's stained glass windows painted by the artist Antti Salmenlinna were also partially destroyed. The church was renovated between 2002 and 2003 according to the plans of the architectural firm Slotte & Schütz. During the repair, the exterior of the church was restored to its original appearance.

The current choir organ of the church, made by organ builder Martti Porthan Oy in 2004, is of Italian style. It has 12 stops, one keyboard and an attached pedal. The previous organ was produced in 1956 by the Austrian company Rieger Orgelbau and was donated to the Lutheran Church of Saint Michael in St. Petersburg in 2012.
