= All-Ukrainian Union of Churches of Evangelical Christian Baptists =

Ukrainian religious denomination

All-Ukrainian Union of Churches of Evangelical Christian-Baptists
- Classification: Evangelical Christianity
- Theology: General Baptist
- Associations: Baptist World Alliance; European Baptist Federation; Euro-Asian Federation of Evangelical Christians-Baptists Unions
- Headquarters: Kyiv, Ukraine
- Origin: 1990
- Congregations: 2,154
- Members: 112,000
- Seminaries: 7
- Official website: baptyst.com

The Evangelical Baptist Union of Ukraine or All-Ukrainian Union of Churches of Evangelical Christian Baptists (AUC ECB) (Ukrainian: Всеукраїнський союз церков євангельських християн-баптистів (ВСЦ ЄХБ), romanized: Vseukrainskyi soiuz tserkov yevanhelskykh khrystyian-baptystiv (VSTs YeKhB)) is a Baptist Christian denomination in Ukraine. It is affiliated with the Baptist World Alliance. The headquarters are in Kyiv.

== History ==
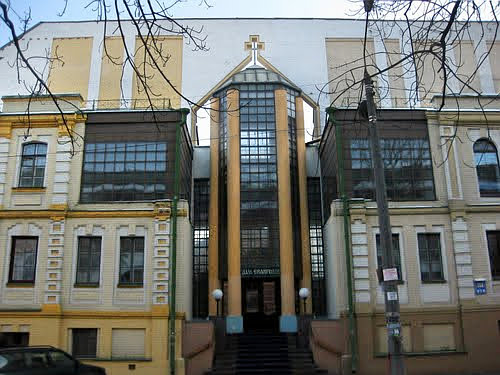
"House of Gospel", the central church of the Union (Kyiv).

The All-Ukrainian Union of Churches of Evangelical Christian-Baptists has its origins in a believer's baptism movement in the 19th century. In 1918, the All-Ukrainian Union of Baptists was founded. In 1922, it became associated with the Russian Union of Evangelical Christians-Baptists. It was officially reorganized in 1990 and became independent of the Russian Union of Evangelical Christians-Baptists. According to a census published by the association in 2025, it claimed 2,154 churches and 112,000 members.

== Schools ==
It has 7 affiliated theological institutes.

== See also ==
- Baptists in Ukraine
- Baptist Union of Poland
- Brotherhood of Independent Baptist Churches and Ministries of Ukraine
- List of Baptist denominations
- Ukrainian Evangelical Baptist Convention of Canada
- Union of Christian Evangelical Baptist Churches of Moldova
- Union of Evangelical Christians-Baptists of Russia
