= Sunday Adelaja =

Ukrainian pastor of Nigerian descent

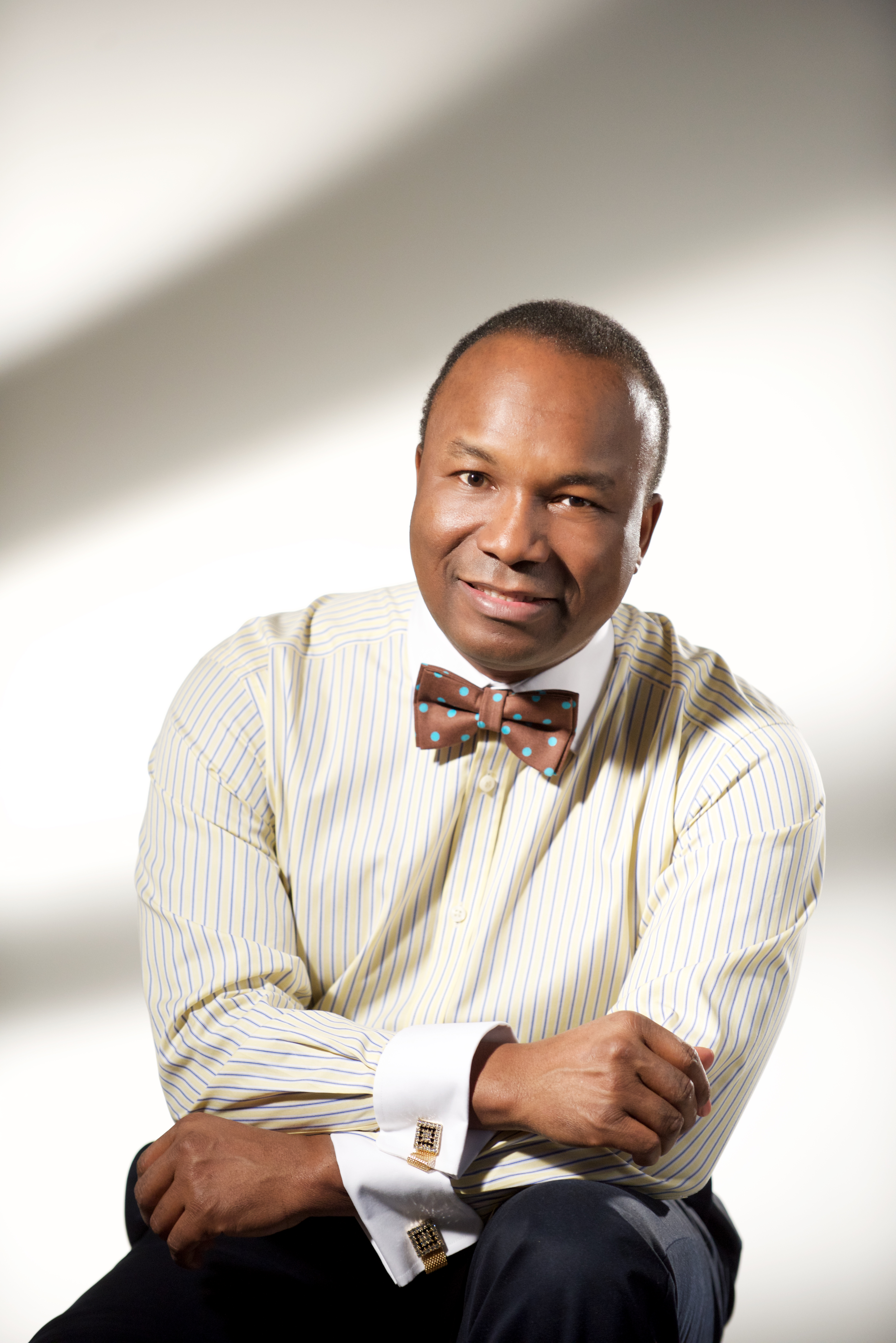
- Adelaja in 2017
- Born: May 28, 1967 (age 59); Idomila Ijebu-Ode, Ogun State, Nigeria
- Occupations: Pastor, journalist, author
- Spouse: Abosede Adelaja

Sunday Adelaja (Russian, Belarusian and Ukrainian: Сандей Аделаджа) is the founder and senior pastor of the Embassy of the Blessed Kingdom of God for All Nations, an evangelical-charismatic megachurch and a Christian denomination in Kyiv, Ukraine.

== Biography ==
Sunday Sunkanmi Adelaja was born in the village of Idomila Ijebu-Ode, Nigeria. His name Adelaja means "crown settled this fight" in Yoruba. He was raised by his grandmother and became Christian in March 1986 just before graduating from high school.

In 1986, after graduation, Adelaja left Nigeria because he received a scholarship to study journalism at the Belarusian State University in Minsk, Byelorussian SSR. He claims he was threatened there by authorities for having a picture of Jesus in his house, but nevertheless, he began Christian activities in Belarus during his studies.

After graduation and the breakdown of the USSR, he moved from Belarus to Ukraine in December 1993.

He married and took a job in Kyiv, becoming a TV presenter, and "possibly the first black correspondent on Ukrainian screens".

At the time of the Russian Invasion of Ukraine on 22 February 2022, Adelaja was living in Irpin. By his own account, he was tipped off that day that he was on a Russian hitlist, and he and his wife immediately drove to Poland, gaining asylum in Belgium later in 2022, where he was resident as of 2024. His Ukraine home was destroyed by the Russian army.

It was reported in 2024 that Adelaja was focusing his endeavours on improving the quality of Pentecostal ministry in Nigeria.

== Ministry ==
In 1993, 7 people and Adelaja founded the "Embassy of the Blessed Kingdom of God for All Nations" in his apartment. The church was officially founded in 1994 as the "World of Faith Bible Church". The Church flourished partly by providing basic social care, such as food and help with alcoholism, in post-Soviet Ukraine, and partly through its engaging services and deployment of Pentecostal "prosperity theology".

In 2013, the church claimed 25,000 members in Kyiv, 100,000 members in Ukraine, and 1,000 churches in the rest of the world, though around this time membership began to diminish due to accusations of financial impropriety by Adelaja.

As of around 2011, thousands of people were being fed daily in the church's soup kitchens in Kyiv. The church also has a program helping homeless people acquire skills, thus helping them back to a normal life and work. According to the church, 2,000 children have been helped off the street and have been returned to their families. Furthermore, the church runs a 24-hour hotline, named "Trust line" for people in need to call for help. The church also works with addicted people and has a program helping them to be set free from their various addictions. The main organization is called "Love Rehabilitation Center.” According to the church, more than 5000 drug and alcohol addicted people have been set free from their addictions through the church's work.

Homeless people are served food in one of the rooms of the "Stephania" soup kitchen of the Embassy of God church. Picture was taken December 30, 2006.

The New York Times made the following statement about Adelaja: "Could there be a more unlikely success story in the former Soviet Union than the Rev. Sunday Adelaja, an immigrant from Nigeria who has developed an ardent — and enormous — following across Ukraine?"

He founded many educational institutions connected to the church, and among them the following are more known: the Joshua Missionary Bible Institute in Ukraine, the Center of Restoration of Personality and Transformation of the Society in Ukraine, the History Makers Bible School in the US, the UK, Germany, France, and the Institute for National Transformation in Nigeria.

Adelaja has frequently faced racism from his critics in the Orthodox Church.

== Awards and honors ==
In October 2010, Sunday Adelaja was one of the foreigners in Ukraine who were awarded The Most Influential Expats 2010 by the Kyiv Post newspaper.

In May 2009, Sunday Adelaja became The Face of Kyiv 2009. The annual competition was conducted by the magazine Afisha and Adelaja took the first place with more than 1/3 of the votes, beating to the second position, the most popular actor in Ukraine, Bohdan Stupka; to the third place, the Heavy weight boxer Vitali Klitschko; to the fourth place, one of the richest Entrepreneurs in Ukraine, Viktor Pinchuk; and to the fifth place the Mayor of Kyiv, Leonid Chernovetskyi.

At the Azusa Street Revival Festival on Saturday April 25, 2009, Sunday Adelaja received the first International William J. Seymour Award. This award is given to ministers who exhibit the characteristics of William J. Seymour. A statement from the award committee said: "This year we will award an international and national recipient: The international recipient will be Pastor Sunday Adelaja who is a Nigerian-born leader with an apostolic gift for the 21st century. In his mid-thirties Pastor Sunday has already proven to be one of the world's most dynamic communicators and church planters and is regarded as the most successful pastor in Europe with over 25,000 members as well as daughter and satellite churches in over 35 countries worldwide".

In March 2008 the Archbishop Benson Idahosa Prize for Missionary Exploits was presented to Rev. Sunday Adelaja in recognition of his missionary exploits and social engagement in Kyiv, Ukraine and around the world.

In March 2007 Sunday Adelaja became an Honorable Member of the Euroasian International Chamber of Commerce.

In May 2004 The Redeemed Christian Church of God (RCCG) Holland Mission gave a Special Appreciation to Adelaja for being part of what God is using His church to do in reaching out to the people of the Netherlands.

Adelaja opened the U.S. Senate in prayer on April 23, 2007, and spoke twice at the United Nations on August 23, 2007.

== Criticisms ==
=== Alleged fraud ===
Adelaja was accused in November 2008 of being involved in the dealings of King's Capital, a financial group led by a former member of his congregation. The company promised as much as 60 percent returns on investments and drew many of its investors from the church. Later several former church members went to the authorities saying they were unable to recover the money they invested, which left many of them bankrupt. Police later arrested one of King's Capital leaders, Aleksandr Bandurchenko, on suspicion of fraud.

On February 5, 2009, a criminal case against Sunday Adelaja was filed on acclaim and suspicion of fraud. Investigators said they had testimony indicating that Adelaja was involved in the financial machinations allegedly committed by the King's Capital financial group. Kyiv's Mayor Chernovetsky, himself a church member, had earlier said that Adelaja was not involved in the financial scheme at King's Capital.

In September 2009, the Ministry of Internal Affairs of Ukraine admitted that they had exhausted their possibilities in the criminal case against Sunday Adelaja. Since the Ministry of Internal Affairs had delayed and refused to take the case to the court, the Embassy of God church and Sunday Adelaja initiated a lawsuit against the Ministry of Internal Affairs and the Police of Ukraine for unlawful accusation and libel. The judge in the lawsuit asked the Ministry of Internal Affairs to show their evidence for their accusation of fraud, but after five court hearings, they had still not provided evidence to support their accusation.

On October 12, 2009, Kyiv investigators questioned Adelaja in connection with the fraud accusation. During a press conference On October 14, 2009, the Minister of Internal Affairs Yuriy Lutsenko said that the pre-trial proceedings had found out that from October 2006 to May 2008, Adelaja and others embezzled property of people most of whom were the believers of the Embassy of God church. The total amount of the damage due to these actions is over ₴1.5 million in accordance with evidence provided by several witnesses, according to the Minister.

Adelaja considers the police's decision to investigate him for involvement in the financial group's machinations as an implementation of political order. He has said that the cause of the financial problems at the King's Capital financial group was the economic crisis rather than deliberate fraud and that his wife lost money by participating in the scheme.

No court case was brought against Adelaja, and in 2023, a court found that the case had passed its statute of limitations. In 2024, The Economist reported that "a lawyer close to the case says the authorities are attempting to appeal that decision".

=== Theology ===
On 28 December 2008, nine leaders of evangelical churches in Ukraine signed a statement in which they, among other things, dissociated themselves from Sunday Adelaja and his activity. They accused him of trying to create a cult of personality and of using methods and activity based on self-advertisement, exaggeration of personal merits, teaching the doctrine of prosperity and the sin of love of money, and his practice of cursing the church members and parishioners who disagree with his opinion.

In March 2016, the Russian Union of Christians of Evangelical Faith announced in a press release that Adelaja was in recovery after confessing before a conference of pastors to adultery with women in the church. The pastor denied the affair, citing an attempt by pastors to take his place and not having been to Russia for 10 years.

== Politics ==
Adelaja supports Ukrainian nationalism: according to him Ukraine can only become independent through a nationalist mood. He considers it unfortunate that patriotism does not apply to all Ukrainians. "Only through the nationalistic mood can the Ukrainian nation become independent at all. If Ukrainians do not become more nationalistic, I am afraid that this country may come back under the Russian or Polish or Hungarian or some other yoke".

Adelaja thinks racism is not typical of the Ukrainian society. "I think it is a more Russian phenomenon, which came here. But Russia also sees how bad racism is for a country's reputation".

=== Role in Orange Revolution ===
Adelaja's church has been credited with playing an active role in the popular gatherings that eventually led to the Orange Revolution, and during the protests, the church erected a tent chapel on Independence Square and offered shelter to thousands of people who came to Kyiv. The then-mayor of Kyiv, Leonid Chernovetsky, is a member of the Embassy of God, but he was in opposition to the principal actors of the Orange Revolution, including Premier Yulia Tymoshenko. Adelaja stated about the then candidate in and later winner of the 2004 Ukrainian presidential election Viktor Yushchenko: "He is a committed believer who is serious about his faith, and is influenced by God and the Bible". Yushchenko later provided Adelaja with a certificate of thankfulness for his support in the Orange Revolution. Adelaja has been seen as a strong supporter of the Orange Revolution: "Twelve years ago we were freed from Communism. Though we have had a different government with different uniforms since, the same corrupt people have remained in power. Now, Ukraine has its first opportunity to choose our own free way of life." However, Adelaja has denounced in Ukrainian media his implied initiation of the Orange Revolution. During the 2010 president elections Adelaja decided and called all affiliated churches to vote for Victor Yanukovich, the opponent of the "Orange" leaders (Tymoshenko and Yushchenko).

=== Relationship with Russia ===
In 2006, Adelaja was invited to appear on a Russia TV show, but was barred from entering the country. His church was criticised by Russian authorities as both a vector of American influence in Russia and as Satanic, and most Russian branches were closed. At the time of Russia's invasion of Ukraine in 2022, Adelaja believed that he was on a Russian hit-list, a view seen as plausible by the scholar Catherine Wanner.

== Bibliography ==
Sunday Adelaja has written many books in various languages.

- Life Is An Opportunity, 2017
- Money won’t make you Rich, 2016
- The Kingdom Driven Life: Thy Kingdom Come Thy will be Done on Earth..., 2015
- Time is Life: History Makers Honor Time, 2012
- Accessing Divine Wisdom, 2008
- ChurchShift, 2008
- ChurchShift Guide, 2008
- Understanding God, 2007
- The road to greatness, 2006
- The Jesus you never knew, 2006
- Successful marriage takes work, 2005
- Life and death in the power of the tongue, 2005
- The man God will use, 2005
- Pastoring without tears, 2005
- Living sexually free, 2005
- You and your pastor, 2003
- How to keep your focus, 2015
- Money Wont make You Rich, 2009
- Myles Munroe - Finding Answers To Why Good People Die Tragic and Early Deaths, 2016
- Nigeria And The Leadership Question, 2016
- Only God Can Save Nigeria, 2016
- The Kingdom Driven Life, 2016
- Who Am I, 2016
- 7 Tips To Self-fulfilment In Life, 2017
- A Visionless Life Is A Meaningless Life, 2017
- Could You Be The Abraham Of Your Nation, 2017
- Create Your Own Net Worth, 2017
- Discover The Source Of Your Latent Energy, 2017
- Discovering The Purpose And Calling Of Nations, 2017
- DON’T EAT TOMORROW’S FOOD TODAY, 2017
- Excellence Your Key To Elevation, 2017
- Hello! I Am Searching For Problems, 2017
- How Africans Brought Civilization To Europe, 2017
- How The Nigerian Economy Can Overtake The American Economy, 2017
- How To Be In The Here And Now, 2017
- How To Become A Developed Nation Through The Dignity Of Labor, 2017
- How To Become Great Through Time Conversion, 2017
- How To Build A Secured Financial Future, 2017
- How to form core values in a child, 2017
- How To Get What You Need In Life, 2017
- How To Live An Effective Life, 2017
- How To Make Nigeria The Greatest Country In The World, 2017
- How To Overcome The Fear Of Death, 2017
- How To Regain Your Lost Years, 2017
- How To Transform And Build a Civilized Nation, 2017
- How To Win In Life, 2017
- I Am A Person. Am I A Personality?, 2017
- Insulted by Ungodliness, 2017
- Life Is An Opportunity, 2017
- Mountain of Ignorance, 2017
- No One Is Better Than You, 2017
- Pastor, Face Your Calling, 2017
- Poverty Mindset Vs Abundance Mindset, 2017
- Problems Your Shortcut To Prominence, 2017
- Raising The Next Generation Of Steve Jobs And Bill Gates, 2017
- Stop Working For Uncle Sam, 2017
- The Creative And Innovative Power Of A Genius, 2017
- The Danger Of Monoculturalism, 2017
- The Essence And Value Of Life, 2017
- The Law of Difference, 2017
- The Nigerian Economy. The Way Forward, 2017
- The Veritable Source Of Energy, 2017
- What Do You Do With Your Time, 2017
- Where are the heroes? Let heroes Аrise!, 2017
- Where There Is Problem There Is Money, 2017
- Why Losing Your Job Is The Best Thing That Could Happen To You, 2017
- Why You Must Urgently Become A Workaholic, 2017
- Work Is Better Than Vacation, Labour Better Than Favour, 2017
- Your greatness is proportional to your trials, crises and tribulations!, 2017
- The power and force of discipline for transforming lives and nations, 2017
- RID YOURSELF OF SHALOWMIDEDNESS, CREATE SOLUTIONS FOR YOUR WORLD, 2018
- WHEN TO PRAY, WHEN NOT TO PRAY AND WHEN TO STOP PRAYING, 2018
- Why am I unlucky?, 2018
- Teambuilding skills of Jesus, 2018
- STOP BLAMING WHAT YOU LACK, 2018
- YOUR TOMORROW DEPENDS ON THE ACTIONS YOU TAKE TODAY, 2018
- The role of elites in national transformation, 2018
- The sin of irresponsibility, 2018
- HOW TO TURN NEGATIVE ENERGY INTO POSITIVE ENERGY, 2018
- FALSE AND TRUE UNDERSTANDING OF LOVE, 2018
- HOW TO TRANSFORM A NATION THROUGH THE POWER OF FAITH, 2018
- You are born to make your nation great, 2018

== See also ==
- Embassy of God
