= Biblists =

Jewish sect in 19th-century Russia

Spiritual-Bible Brotherhood
- Духовно-библейское братство
- Nickname: Biblists, Bibleitzy
- Formation: c. 1880
- Founder: Jacob Gordin
- Founded at: Yelisavetgrad, Kherson Governorate, Russian Empire
- Dissolved: September 30, 1891; 135 years ago

The Biblists, also known as the Bibleitzy and the Spiritual-Bible Brotherhood (Russian: Духовно-библейское братство, romanized: Dukhovnoye-Bibleyskoye Bratstvo) were a sect of Jewish religious reformers in late 19th-century Russia. The group advocated for radical reform of Jewish economic life, a rejection of the Talmud and other post-Biblical authorities, and the abolition of ritual observances in Judaism.

== History ==
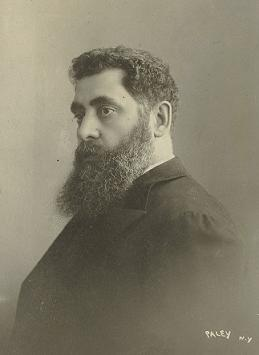
Founder Jacob Gordin (1853–1909)

The sect emerged around 1880 among the Jewish working classes of Yelisavetgrad, South Russia, under the leadership of Jacob Gordin, in response to a wave of pogroms in the area.

The founders of the Brotherhood believed that antisemitism was rooted in the historical role of the Jews in Poland and Ukraine and supported by their religious separateness. Influenced by both Narodnik and Stundist ideals, Gordin and his adherents maintained that a resolution of the Jewish question will be possible only when the Jews not only give up their religious exclusivity and national identity, but also their former occupations and engage exclusively in 'productive' work. To this end, the Biblists did away with dogmatic theology and all fast days, holidays, and religious ceremonies, including brit milahs, marriage, and even prayer. Only the Tanakh was regarded as the source of faith, with complete freedom in its interpretation, according to the spirit of the age and the findings of science. Members of the Brotherhood were also required to engage in physical labour, especially farming.

The group's activities aroused consternation in the local Jewish press and community; on 16 June 1884, a group of Jews, including parents of the young people who had been attracted to the sect, attacked the Bratstvo meeting place. Particular outrage was caused by inflammatory letters published by Gordin outlining the dissident group's views:

Brothers, Jews, think it over why are you despised, why does no one have pity on you? ... It is our love for money, our arrogance, our usury, inn keeping and the middlemen occupations and all the other dishonest deeds that enrage the Russian population against us.

After a long effort, Gordin succeeded in having the sect officially legalized on 12 January 1885; he was permitted to establish a synagogue or a prayer school, and to elect his own rabbi. (Other points of his petition, such as permission for the brotherhood to acquire land, and to establish Jewish agricultural communities, were not granted.) At this time, the Bratstvo numbered about fifty adherents in Yelisavetgrad, and a few smaller groups in Odessa, Nikolayev, Uman, and elsewhere. On 8 December 1888 the Ministry of Justice agreed to the Brotherhood's request to establish its own birth registry, separate from other Yelisavetgrad Jews.

Nonetheless, the local government soon began to look upon the group with disfavour, and Gordin fled the country in July 1891. The police finally disbanded the Bratstvo on 30 September 1891.

== See also ==
- Am Olam
- Karaite Judaism
- Jewish agricultural colonies in the Russian Empire
- Stundists
