= Ukrainian Evangelical Baptist Convention of Canada =

Ukrainian Canadian religious organisation

The Ukrainian Evangelical Baptist Convention of Canada is a Baptist Christian denomination composed of Ukrainian-speaking congregations in Canada.

== History ==
Ukrainian Baptists became established in Canada early in the 20th century from two independent sources. A group of Ukrainian immigrant families laid down the foundation and established the first Ukrainian Baptist church in Canada, electing Rev. Ivan Shakotko to be the pastor in Winnipeg in 1903. Around the turn of the 20th century, English-speaking Baptists sent a missionary to labour among the growing Ukrainian population in western Canada. From this work, a church was organized in Overstone, Manitoba in 1904. Around this same time, Baptist work among Ukrainian Canadians was started in Toronto, and in Saskatchewan. John Kolesnikoff, a missionary, moved to Canada from eastern Ukraine in 1907. These churches were successful in attracting Mennonite, Shtundist, and Eastern Orthodox emigrants from Imperial Russia. The first annual conference of Ukrainian Baptists in Canada was organized by Rev. Shakotko and Rev. Kolesnikoff in Canora, Saskatchewan in 1908. It was originally called the "Russian-Galician Evangelical Convention" and gradually changed to "Russian-Ukrainian" as the name Ukrainian was popularized. For a number of years afterwards the body operated as the "Federation of Ukrainian Baptist Churches in Canada". In 1961, they incorporated under the current name.

== See also ==
- Baptists in Ukraine
- All-Ukrainian Union of Churches of Evangelical Christian Baptists
- Fellowship of Evangelical Baptist Churches in Canada
- List of Baptist denominations
- Union of Slavic Churches of Evangelical Christians and Slavic Baptists of Canada
