= Russian Union of Evangelical Christians-Baptists =

National Baptist union

- Российский союз евангельских христиан-баптистов
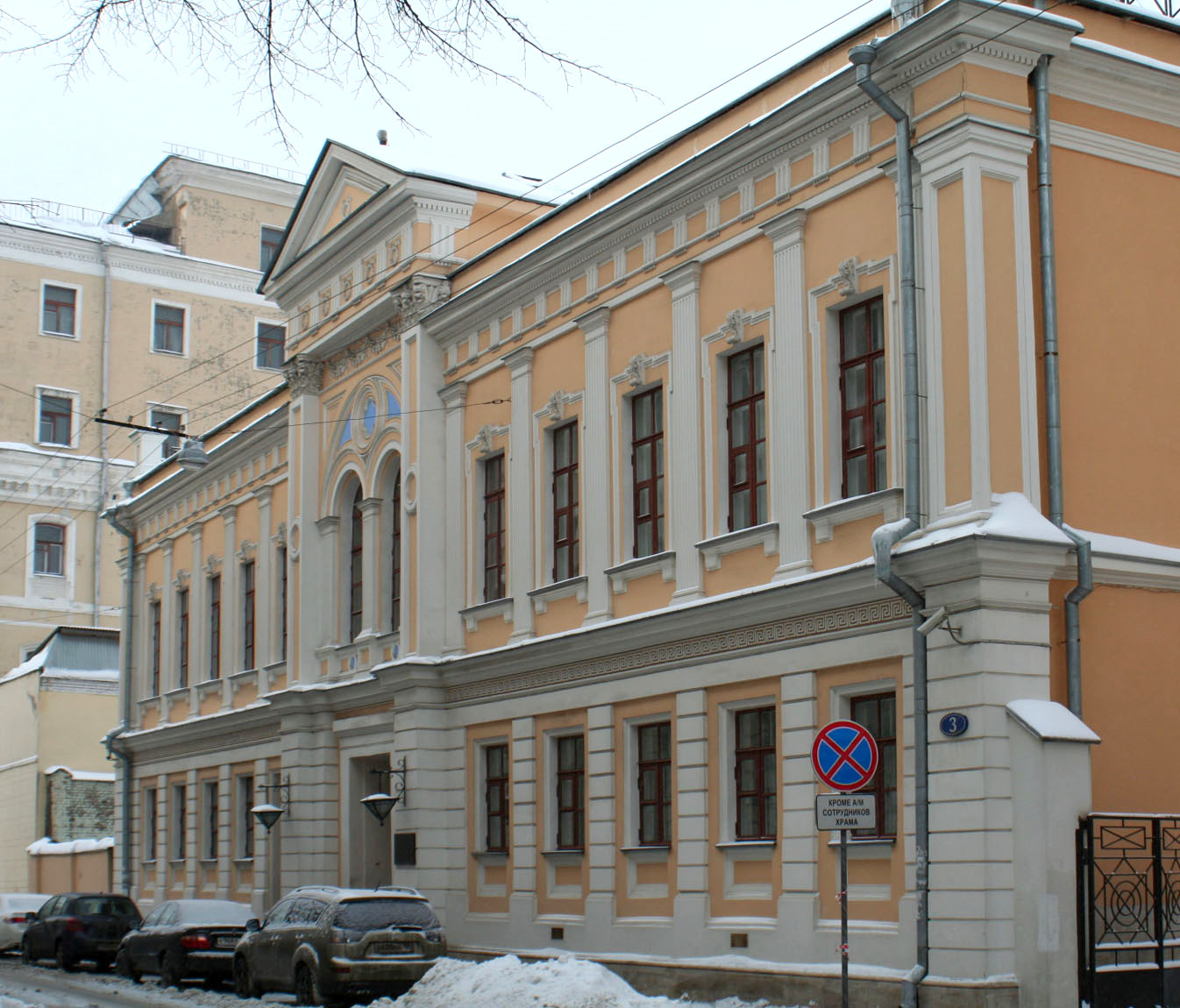
- Moscow Central Church
- Classification: Evangelical Christianity
- Theology: General Baptist
- Associations: Baptist World Alliance; European Baptist Federation; Euro-Asian Federation of Evangelical Christians-Baptists Unions
- Headquarters: Moscow, Russia
- Origin: 1944
- Separations: "Unregistered Baptists" (1961); Evangelical Russian Church (1990)
- Congregations: 1,674
- Members: 68,166
- Seminaries: Moscow Baptist Theological Seminary
- Official website: baptist.org.ru

The Russian Union of Evangelical Christians-Baptists, RUECB (Russian: Росси́йский сою́з ева́нгельских христиа́н-бапти́стов, РСЕХБ, romanized: Rossíyskiy soyúz yevángel'skikh khristián-baptístov, RSEKhB) is a Baptist Christian denomination in Russia. It is affiliated with the Baptist World Alliance. The headquarters is in Moscow.

== History ==
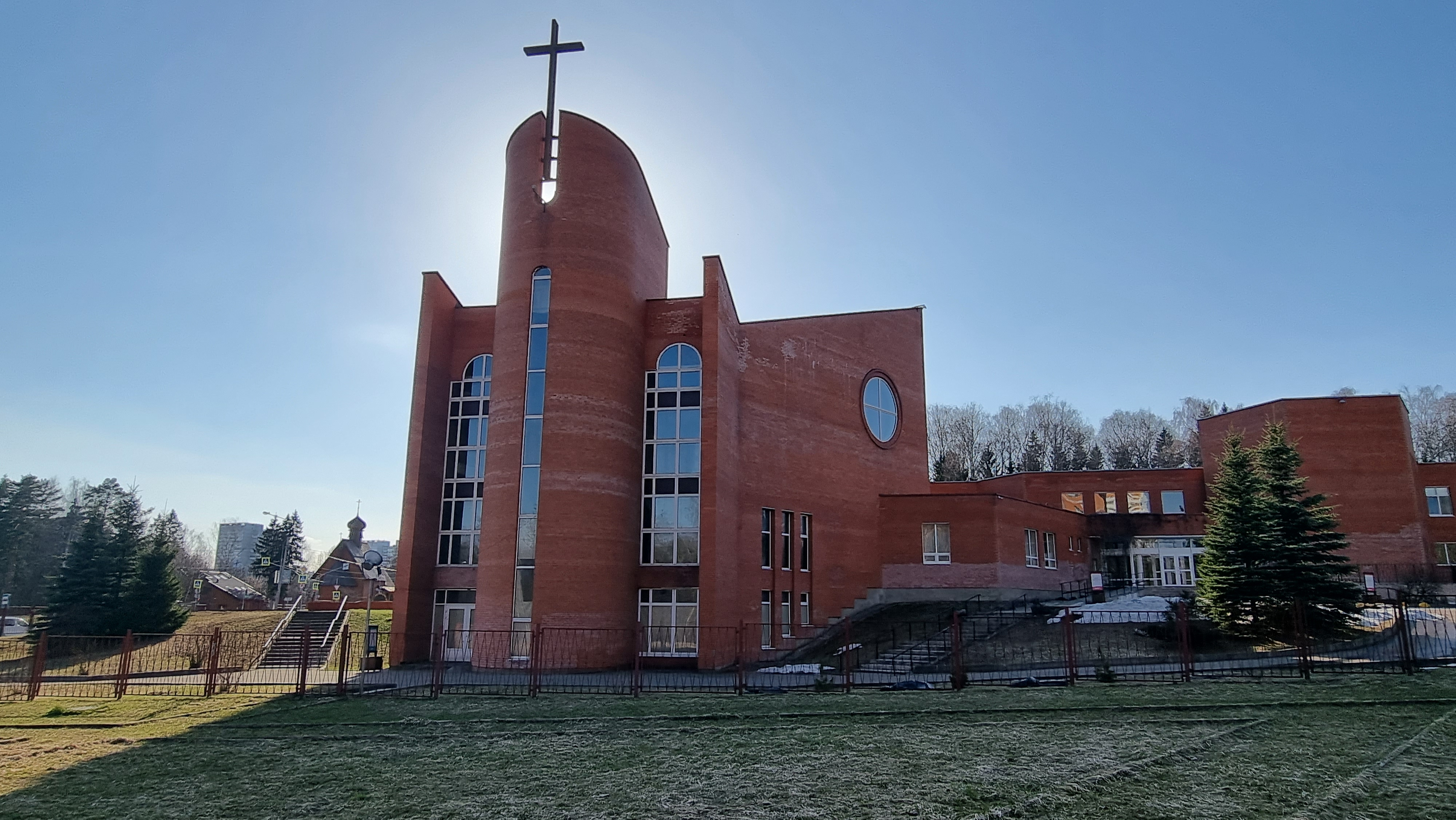
Zelenograd Baptist Church.

The union has its origins in an Evangelical group in 1867 and its leader Nikita Isaevich Voronin who was baptized in the Kura river in Tbilisi, Caucasus, in present-day Georgia. German Mennonites in Ukraine and Lutherans in the Baltic coast started a revival that became known as "Stundist", which led to the formation of churches composed of baptized adult believers. Vasily Pashkov, a retired army colonel in St Petersburg, introduced the evangelical message in the upper classes in the city, adhering to the principles of the Plymouth Brethren and later would emerge in the Union of the Evangelical Christians in All-Russia.

== Soviet era ==
After coming to power, the Soviet government attempted to weaken the influence of the Russian Orthodox Church by encouraging Baptist and Methodist missionaries. However, when the missionaries helped their members by administering welfare programs and building homes, the government clamped down. Laws passed in April 1929 declared that "the activity of all religious units be confined to the exercise of religion, and be not permitted any economic or cultural work which exceeds the limits of their ministry to the spiritual needs of Soviet citizens" and prevented churches being used by anyone outside the community served. In July 1929 Russian Baptists conducted a mass baptism in the Moscow River, a month after the Soviet Congress had passed a resolution limiting religious propaganda. The official press reported negatively on the event. In June 1942, at the height of the Second World War, a plea came from "4,000,000 Russian Baptists" for Christians in the U.S. and Great Britain to pray for Russia's victory. The number may have been exaggerated, but indicated that the Baptist church was strong.

In 1944, the Union of Evangelical Christians and the Russian Baptist Union became the All-Union of the Evangelical Christians-Baptists; Pentecostals were later added because of government pressure.

Estonian Baptists were also pressured to join the Russian Baptist Union; the government's interest in uniting these denominations was perceived by the faith communities as an attempt to control them better and to provoke them to fight each other (over infant vs. adult baptism and other doctrinal issuest), thus making it possible for the government to liquidate their communities with greater ease. Churches that failed to cooperate in forming this union could be closed down by the government.

Despite the differences and theological disagreements, many of these churches came to recognize the need to cooperate with each other in the hostile atheistic society and tried to build friendly relationships between their respective communities.

In the summer of 1946, Joseph Stalin invited Louie De Votie Newton, president of the Southern Baptist Convention in the United States, to visit Russia on a five-week tour and to investigate the status of its 2,000,000 Baptists. Newton reported that the churches were open seven days a week, carrying on highly active programs of religious instruction, culture and recreation.

Baptists were depicted in Soviet propaganda as being dangerous and unintelligent. The goal of the Soviet government was to root out all religion, and churches were considered enemies of the people. At the same time, churches played an important role in cooperating with the state on an international level by giving a positive depiction of Soviet society. This role included promoting the peace movement. The period during the war and afterwards was lenient on most religions (relatively speaking, compared to most of Soviet history); however, beginning in the late 1950s the state began to more aggressively attack religion. All Christians (including Baptists) were isolated from public life and the mass media as well as the education system, which was filled with atheistic propaganda.

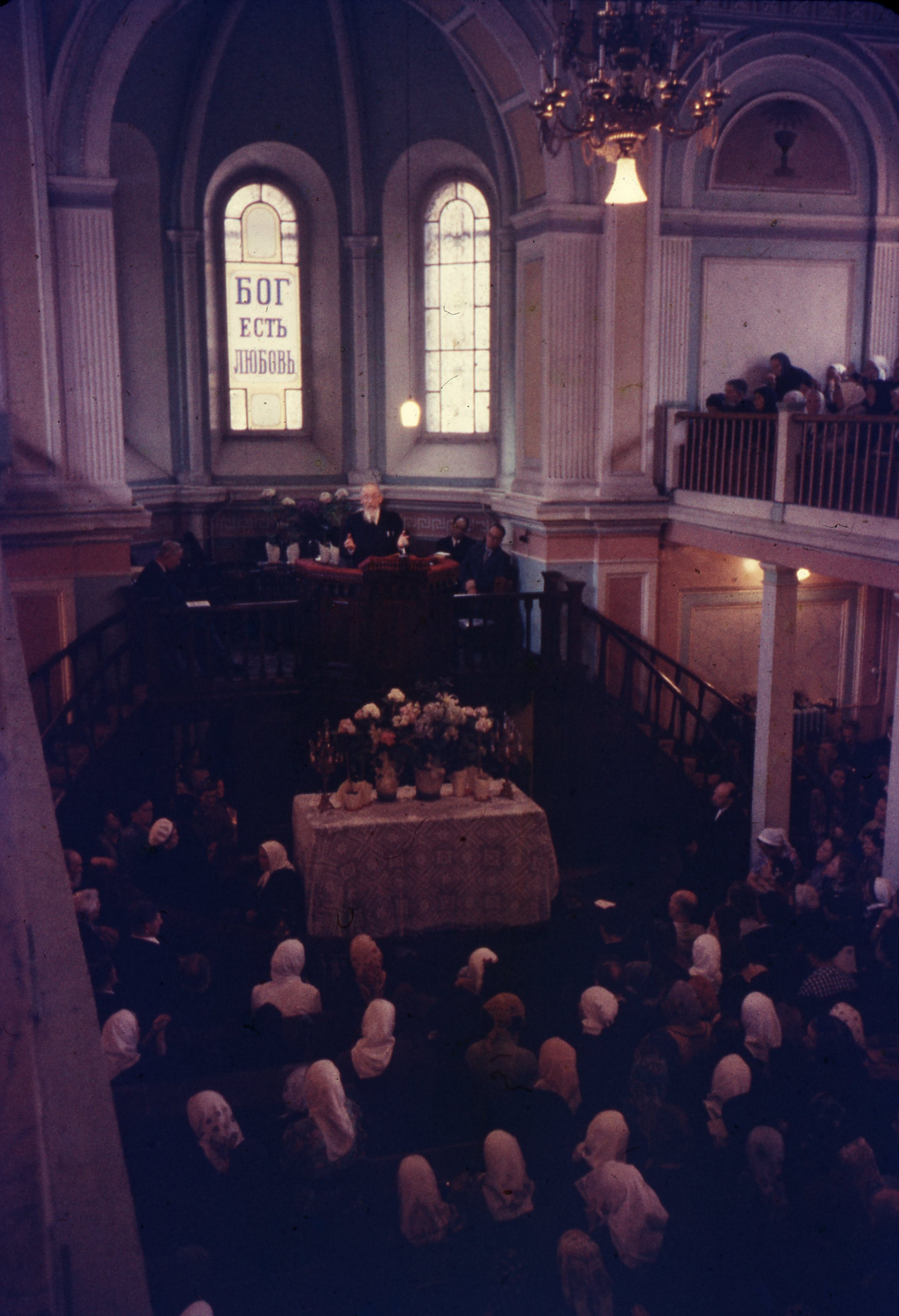
Inside the main Baptist church in Moscow during the Soviet era.

Administrative harassment of Baptist churches occurred, such as refusing permission to move to a new prayer house by claiming that the new building was not sanitary (even though the old building that they were then confined to was even less sanitary). The KGB recruited agents from different Christian churches; however, it may have had difficulties in recruiting agents from Baptists and similar Evangelical churches—a fourth department KGB report from 1956 said in reference to them, "a special psychological approach is needed to recruit sectarians, among whom there are many religious fanatics."

Christians (Baptists included) could be expelled from a university and had difficulties finding a job if they were open about their faith. Christian youth work and work among children was forbidden, churches were required to pay higher electricity rates, pastors could not receive state pensions, and churches were forbidden from doing social work. Evangelism occurred illegally. Baptists used 'revival weeks' as a means of public outreach because of the harsh conditions that forbade open evangelism; music was also an especially important tool of evangelization.

Once Khrushchev's heightened attack on religion began in the late 1950s, many Baptist activities were shut down. Baptists were required to study the Soviet constitution.

In 1959 an article in the official organ Izvestia said that "The Baptists and other evangelical sects mislead people with high-flown words and try to divert them from an industrious life and from the enlightened happenings of our great era. They try to disrupt Soviet morality". In 1960 leaders of the Russian Baptists claimed a membership of 3,000,000.

In 1950s, some Christians were unhappy that church leaders were compliant with state anti-church policies, even collaborating with the state. Because of this, some started to express the view that the church should be separate from the influence of the state. At first, such Christians were silenced or persecuted, but their numbers grew. In 1961, a new movement started, subsequently called the "Unregistered Baptists." The state persecuted leaders and pastors of the new movement. Many were jailed and sent to work camps; however, the government was never able to stop the movement, which continued into the 21st century. The most important distinctives of "Unregistered Baptists" in the 1960-1970s were:

- They were independent from the State in all church matters (in contrast to the "registered", who at some point had to get permission from the state officials in order to baptize someone)
- They did not register their churches with the State (hence their name)
- They organized print houses that printed Bibles, song books, and other literature. This activity was illegal in the Soviet Union.
- They organized ministries to support prisoners and their families. Members of "registered" churches was prohibited from even praying in church about prisoners, since officially nobody in The Soviet Union was persecuted because of their faith.

In the last decades of Soviet history, many youth began to take an increasing interest in learning about religion, to the dislike of the state. In the 1970s many Baptist churches began organizing illegal youth camps. In 1984 Billy Graham went to the Soviet Union and visited Baptist churches.

== Statistics ==
Baptist communities in different corners of Russia have experienced state harassment in recent years.

The UECB is multiethnic, consisting of Russians, Ukrainians, Belarusians, Germans, Latvians, Armenians, Georgians, Ossets, Moldavians, Chuvashes, Komi, and other nationalities. According to a census published by the association in 2023, it claimed 1,674 churches and 68,166 members.

== Schools ==
It has 1 affiliated theological institute, the Moscow Baptist Theological Seminary founded in 1993.

== Personnel ==
Chairmen or presidents of the organization were:

- Vasily Logvinenko (1992–1993)
- Peter Konovalchik (1994–2002)
- Yuri Sipko (2002–2010)
- Alexey Smirnov (2010–2018)
- Peter Mickiewicz (2018–present)

== See also ==
- Christianity in Russia
- Baptist beliefs
- Believers' Church
- Jesus Christ
- Spiritual Christians
