= Anastasia Vyaltseva =

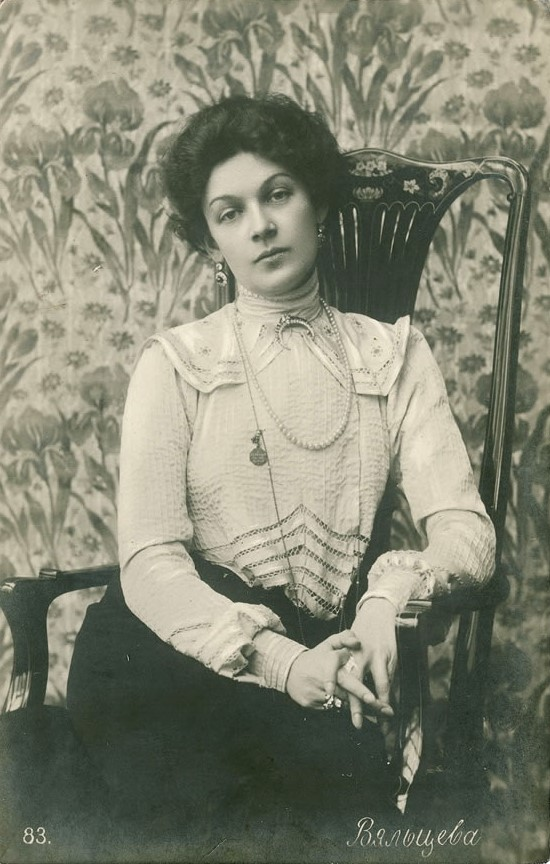
- A.D. Vyaltseva in the 1900s

Background information
- Born: Anastasia Vyaltseva; 19 February [O.S. 1 March] 1871; Altukhovo, Sevsky Uyezd, Oryol Governorate, Russian Empire
- Died: 18 February 1913 (aged 41) Saint Petersburg, Russian Empire
- Occupation: Opera singer (mezzo-soprano)
- Years active: 1893-1912

Anastasia Dmitrievna Vyaltseva (Russian: Анастаси́я Дми́триевна Вя́льцева; 1871–1913) was a Russian mezzo-soprano, specializing in Gypsy art songs. Enjoying the cult following and supported by the popular press (which called her The Incomparable, Nesravnennaya), she toured regularly and was engaged in numerous operettas (Saffi in The Gypsy Baron by Johann Strauss, Perichole in La Perichole and Helene in Offenbach's La belle Helene), as well as operas, appearing in the Mariyinsky Theatre, as Carmen (Carmen by Georges Bizet), Amneris (Aida by Giuseppe Verdi, Dalila (Samson and Delilah by Camille Saint-Saëns). The biggest star of the Russian popular music scene of the 1900s, Vyaltseva had more than 300 songs to her repertoire, one of the best loved being "I Fall In and Out of Love at Will".

== Biography ==
=== Early years ===
Anastasia Vyaltseva was born on 1 March 1871, in Altukhovo, a sloboda in the Sevsky Uyezd of the Oryol Governorate, now the Navlinsky District of Bryansk Oblast. Her mother Maria Tikhonovna was a local peasant woman. Her father Dmitry Vyaltsev, born in Svyazye village (in Trubchevsk, according to other sources), was a forester servant supervising some of the estates of a local landowner. Rumour had it she was an illegitimate child of the estate's manager, named Alexey. The latter arranged Maria's marriage to Dmitry Vyaltsev, a forester, who agreed to give her children his surname and paternal (middle) name.

After Dmitry's death (he was killed by a falling tree) Maria Tikhonovna with Nastya and two sons, Yakov and Ananiy, settled in her elderly parents' small wooden hut at the outskirts of Altukhovo. Several years later she took her three children to Kiev where she worked as laundress. In Kiev, eight-year-old Anastasia joined a dressmaker's saloon. The clientele, mostly choirgirls from the Kiev theatres, soon discovered the girl had a voice.

=== Career ===
At the age of fourteen Vyaltseva visited the Kiev ballet-master Lenchevsky and in 1887 joined his ballet troupe. A year later she approached Yosif Setov, a respected operetta entrepreneur whose troupe was staying in Kiev for a winter season. Impressed by her singing, he invited the youngster to join in as a dancer, since there were no vacancies in the vocal section at the time. Dancing was not Vyaltseva's strong point though, and, the quality of her voice notwithstanding, the public thought little before pelting at her rotten tomatoes. Setov did everything he could to encourage the girl, and later she remembered him with gratitude, calling him her "artistic godfather."

As the Setov troupe disbanded, Vyaltseva joined the small Larionova-Larina operetta collective as a choirgirl. In 1890, now a member of the Zdanovich-Boreyko group, she toured the Russian province, performing miniature solo parts for the first time. In 1892 the singer joined the Vilno-based Nezlobin troupe, then in 1893 moved to the Moscow Aquarium theatre. While there, she met the established operetta artist Serafima Velskaya (1846-1933) who told the girl she needed serious musical education. For that Vyaltseva had neither time nor money. She moved to Saint Petersburg and, after a short stint with the local Aquarium theatre joined the S.A.Palm's Maly Theatre, again as a choirgirl.

1893 was the year when Gypsy art songs became highly popular in the Russian capital. In Nikolai Kulikov's musical Gypsy Songs in Characters, produced by Palm, Vyaltseva received a small part of Katya. Her rendition of "I Fall in and out of Love at Will" (Zakhochyu - polyublyu) brought the young singer her first success and became her signature tune for years to come. After that Vyaltseva received the role of Boulotta in Jacques Offenbach's Barbe-bleue but in 1897 left the Palm Theatre, which by now started to lose its position as the leading force of the Saint Petersburg operetta.

In the mid-1890s Vyaltseva became a protégée of Nikolai Kholeva, an affluent Saint Petersburg barrister, whose financial support enabled her first to take lessons from Stanislav Sonka, the chairman of the Saint Petersburg's Vocal Society, then visit Italy to study with professor Marti. Kholeva took part in the formation of the singer's repertoire, now a combination of romances and Russian folk songs, and used his influence to ensure the press would respond favourably to her first solo concerts. Soon Vyaltseva herself learned how to deal with journalists and became a press darling. Still the capital knew Vyaltseva as a former choirgirl, so Kholeva moved her to Moscow, hoping for a breakthrough.

In 1897, after several saloon performances Vyaltseva gave her first solo concert in the Moscow Hermitage theatre which proved to be a triumph. Yakov Shchukin, the Moscow entrepreneur and the New Hermitage theatre director first offered her a monthly wage of 750 rubles, then after one season started to pay 133 for each performance. She stayed with the Hermitage up until 1909 and afterwards continued to perform in Shchukin's benefices, giving him credit for her rise to fame.

Anastasia Vyaltseva's first national tour as a solo artist was organized and promoted by L.L.Palmsky. It started on 24 January 1902 in Tver, and was followed by concerts in Tambov and Voronezh. Her most memorable performance proved to be the one in Kharkov on March the 4th. "A serious University city, a high-brow public… But Vyaltseva arrived, sang her powerful song of overpowering love, beamed out this inimitable smile of hers and the same crowd that yesterday discussed Ibsen, was now madly calling out for Troyka and Caressed by Magic... Her connection with Kharkov remained: that was the city where she was adored," wrote the theatre critic Y. Lvov. "As a performer of Gypsy romances M-lle Vyaltseva has no equal…The artist renders these songs masterfully and expressively, easily involving audiences into her art," wrote Odessky Listok several days later. Then, despite the sceptics' predictions to the contrary, she triumphed in Tiflis, the Georgian city with its old theatre and opera traditions. After the tour ended in Pavlovsk, the press started to call her the Incomparable (Nesravnennaya), using the epithet as if it was her stage name.

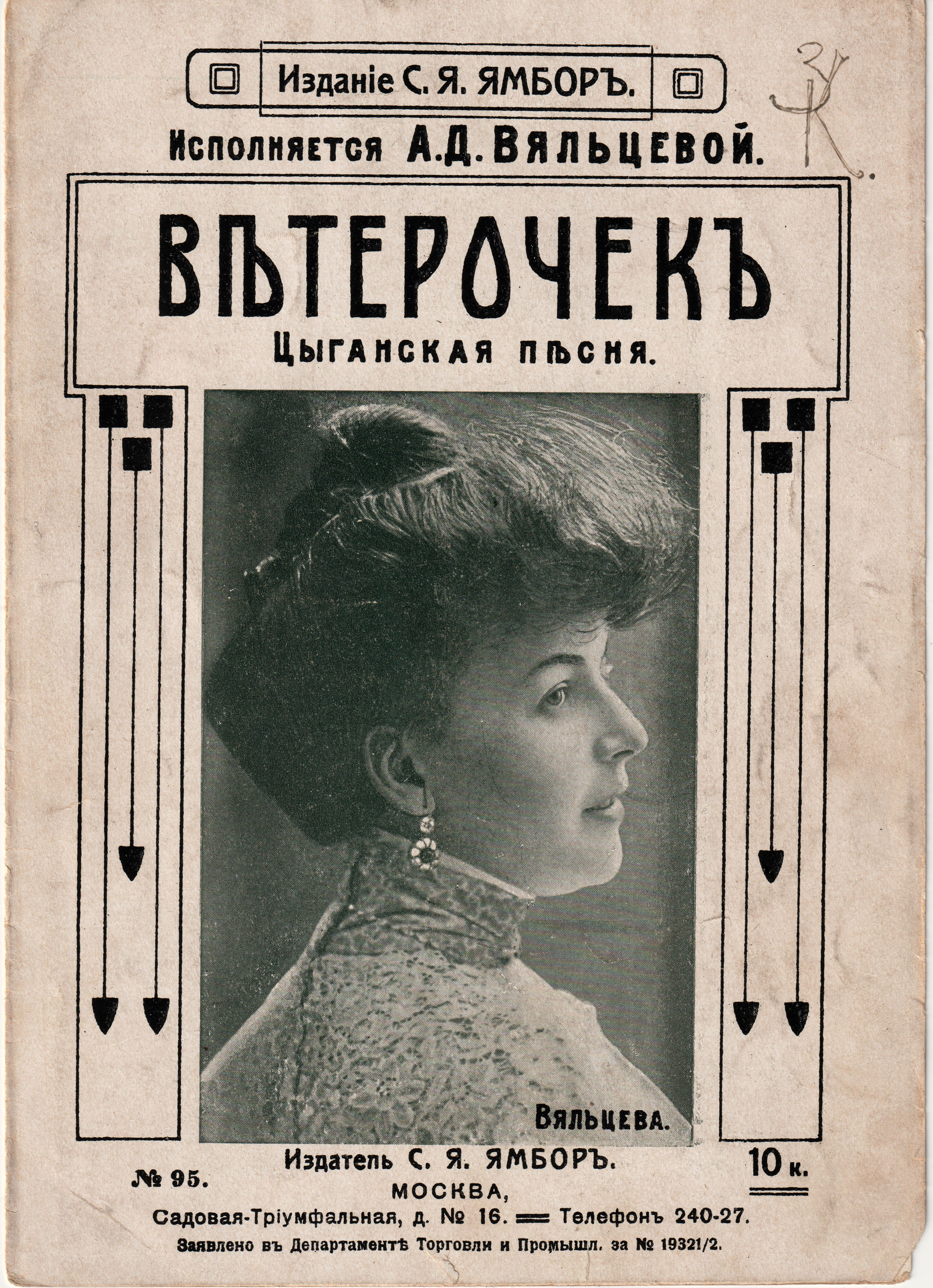
"Little Wind" sheet music with Anastasia Dmitrievna Vyaltseva

==== In the Far East ====
In 1904, soon after breaking up with Nikolai Kholeva, Vyaltseva became romantically linked with Vasily Biskupsky, a Russian National Guard officer. As the Russo-Japanese War had broken out, he was sent to the Far-Eastern front and was severely injured. In July, Vyaltseva cancelled all concerts and went to the Far Eastern location of the Russian army in a medical convoy she financed herself. There she gave several charity concerts in support of the families of fallen soldiers and raised tens of thousands of rubles for improving the conditions Russian army officers and soldiers were living in. Then, as a sister of mercy, she joined the hospital where Biskupsky was recuperating.

In November 1904, Vyaltseva returned to Saint Petersburg. Profoundly shaken by her experience, she still opted against changing her repertoire. "The people are depressed anyway and if they come to hear Vyaltseva, it is obviously with the view to leave all their troubles behind at least for a while," she explained in an interview. In the spring of 1905 Vyaltseva embarked upon her second trip to Manchuria. After the war Biskupsky secretly married Vyaltseva and, when this became known, was forced to retire: a National Guard marrying a peasant daughter was considered a violation of the unwritten code of conduct. Vyaltseva continued to give charity concerts in support of the Russian Army and the Red Cross. In 1911 she financed the raising of the monument to the former 148th Infantry Caspian regiment in Novy Petergof.

==== Vyaltseva in opera ====
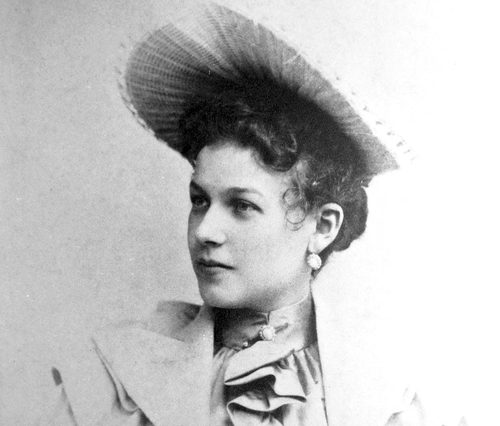
Anastasia Vyaltseva in the 1900s

Vyaltseva, who always dreamed of becoming an opera singer, made her debut as such in July 1902 as the lead in Georges Bizet's Carmen at the Great Hall of the Saint Petersburg conservatory. Critics praised the singer's technical progress but were baffled by 'extraordinary nervousness' that marred her performance. In October 1903 the singer signed an "opera contract" with the private Moscow Solodovnikov Theatre. In 1904 the similar contract made sure the Bouffe Theatre would produce twelve operas especially for her.

Vyaltseva's taking up the male part, that of the Demon, in Anton Rubinstein's opera of the same name, produced uproar and Solodovnikov, under pressure, cancelled the show. This, in its turn outraged Vyaltseva's fans, among them satirist Vlas Doroshevich who denounced this 'victory' as a 'shame'. In January 1904 Vyaltseva performed as the Countess in Tchaikovsky's The Queen of Spades, at Solodovnikov's, to almost unanimous negative critical response. Her next one here, Delilah in Samson and Delilah by Camille Saint-Saëns, received better reviews, yet some critics remained unconvinced with the distinctive "romance intonation" that seemed to creep into the singer's arias from her popular repertoire.

On 11 and 14 June 1904 Vyaltseva appeared as Dalila in the Saint Petersburg's Bouffe Theatre and, despite disappointing performance, was supported by the popular press. The directors were on her side too: it looked like any opera performance of Vyaltseva's was now destined to be a hit, regardless of quality. Later in 1904 Vyaltseva brought her Delilah to Kharkov and was praised there for bringing "more subtlety" to the part. Some critics remained unconvinced. "She has to finally choose between her 'gypsiness' and serious music. Vyaltseva's ardent passions, deep sighs, shining smiles and sparkling glances on the one hand and opera on the other, just do not mix," Yuzhny Krai opined.

In 1905 Vyaltseva sang Lyubasha in the Tsar's Bride by Nikolai Rimsky-Korsakov and Mignon by Ambroise Thomas at Saint Petersburg's Olympia concert hall, again to mixed reviews. Her performance as Mignon was ostensibly overwrought and critics wondered why she chose to impart such passions to this rather lackluster character.

Vyaltseva's dramatic performance as Amneris in Aida by Giuseppe Verdi in May 1906 marked the finest hour of her opera career. But then Peterburgskaya Gazeta started to publish humorous sketches, ridiculing the singer's artistic strife. Later in Moscow, in the middle of Samson and Delilah the public started to call for "Troyka", one of her better known romances. This proved to be the last straw for Vyaltseva; she quit opera and left her main ambition, to sing Tatyana in Tchaikovsky's Evgeny Onegin, unfulfilled. Later critics were divided as for the reasons for Vyaltseva's failure in the opera. Most of them agreed that despite occasional brilliance (certainly, as Carmen), on the whole her opera performances lacked this magical quality that made her Russian romance repertoire so special.

==== Russian "Queen of Gramophone" ====
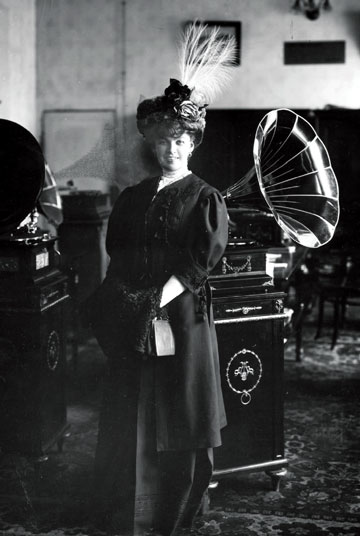
Anastasia Vyaltseva in 1910

In the mid-1900s Vyaltseva became known as the Queen of Gramophone in Russia. Her first recordings were made in 1902, first for the Berhard Optics & Mechanics Traders in Saint Petersburg, then for the Riga-based branch of Gramophone Records. In all, she recorded about a hundred tracks, of which at least 55 have survived. Her records were sold for 6 rubles each (a large sum considering the average teacher's monthly salary at the time was 35 rubles). Touring continuously, two or three times a year the singer regularly returned to the capital to perform at the Gentry assembly (Blagorodnoye sobranye), receiving up to 20 thousand rubles per show. She became one of the two highest-paid artists in Russia, alongside Fyodor Chaliapin. Residing in her large house at the Moyka Street, Saint Petersburg, she spent winters in her Kamenka estate (she’d bought from Count Ignatyev) on Zapadnaya Dvina river, usually in the company of guesting students. Most of the time she spent on the road, traveling in a personal railroad coach, which she commissioned from Belgium in 1908 and decorated after her own taste.

Vyaltseva became famous for giving unusually long concerts, with up to 30 encores per night. In Saint Petersburg 52 encores at one concert was her record. She beat it in August 1912, in Moscow Sokolniki Circle, with 60 encores on the night. Vyaltseva saw her mission as 'serving' her fans, no matter how demanding they'd be. "I've been made, brought up and guided by the public. It forces me to sing the same songs again and again, day after day… I do that almost mechanically with less and less excitement, seeing the public too fails to experience the exaltation... And yet they demand more and more of the same song, and I have no choice but to follow their will for they have every right to exert it upon me," she once complained in an interview.

By the end of the decade Vyaltseva has been known abroad but she declined all offers that came from the West. In 1906 she refused to go to Nice and Monte-Carlo, and in 1909 to England. "People go abroad looking for fame. I found my fame in Russia," she explained, speaking to an English entrepreneur. Vyaltseva's status as the leading female singer in Russia was unquestionable. The popular press supported the singer unanimously, calling her Nesravnennaya, "the Seagull of the Russian popular music", and the "Russian Cinderella".

==== Vyaltseva in operetta ====
In 1909 году Vyaltseva joined Saint Petersburg's Bouffe Theatre owned by Pyotr Tumpakov. The dismal quality of the musical theatre productions in the city horrified her. "They don't even have to sing in modern operettas. Dancing goes first hand, and so it is for ballet now to provide the new breed of operetta singers... I find it disgusting, the operetta scene of today is a nightmare. All the productions I saw this winter were based upon the act of stripping; they were dirty in content and had nothing to do with arts. Operetta became so pornographic it is now a disgrace to work in it," Vyaltseva said in 1907, speaking to Peterburgskaya Gazeta.

Joining forces with some of her equally disaffected colleagues from the Bouffe, Vyaltseva made an attempt to revive the operetta of old. On 27 July 1909 she produced Offenbach's Barbe-bleue, singing Boulotta, to great acclaim. It was followed Boccaccio by Franz von Suppé where she sang the lead; the play had a successful run for several years. Lavishly praised was her Perichole in Offenbach's operetta of the same name. "[You] should hear how the subtlety of the French song merges with the outburst of Gypsy emotion, how tenderly Offenbach's waltz line intertwine with fiery lyrics, to understand why the audience were transfixed," the theatre critic A. Legri wrote. Critics also lauded her performances in Franz Lehár's The Merry Widow, Der Vogelhandler by Carl Zeller, and La belle Helene by Offenbach.

==== Charity ====
By the mid-1900s Vyaltseva had become a rich woman, and philanthropy now was her major preoccupation. The singer gave her first charity concert long before she became a star; in December 1900 she performed at the Russian Technical society's college in Petersburg, in support of the struggling workers' families. In the Vilno region two villages destroyed by fires were built up from scratch on the money donated by Vyaltseva, who arrived at the building site to control the whole process of restoration personally. Later she did the same in the Perm governorate. In her native Altukhovo she built a maternity hospital and herself bought for it all the necessary medical equipment.

Vyaltseva provided financial support for gifted students in Petersburg on the regular basis and apportioned grants among the best. An official letter of gratitude came from Warsaw University where her helping students from poor families was especially appreciated. The feeling was reciprocated: Vyaltseva said that of all the cities she's visited, there was the one she fell deeply in love with, and that was Warsaw.

Vyaltseva supported provincial theatres and helped actors who were destitute. Several debutants were always touring with her as a support group, getting spotlight they'd otherwise never have got. In 1907 she saved the Tsaritsyn theatre from bankruptcy, and since then theatres from all over Russia started apply for help. In July 1907 The Russian Society for Helping the victims of emergencies elected her its honorary member. In 1912 along with Fyodor Chalyapin and Leonid Sobinov, Vyaltseva financed Captain Georgy Sedov's expedition to the North Pole.

=== Personality and lifestyle ===
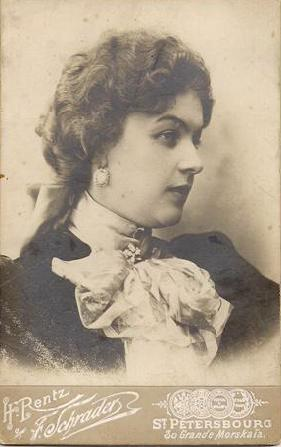
Vyaltseva in 1903

According to Richard Stites, Vyaltseva "recapitulated the style of her art in a private life of extravagant love affairs, conspicuous consumption, lavish spending, and heavy drinking that shortened her life." None of this is corroborated by the Russian sources, which give the picture of a self-controlled, well-organized person who loathed any kind of excess. Caring a lot for the quality of her voice which she trained diligently for years on a daily basis, the singer avoided alcohol and was strict with her diet.

Supporting many of her younger colleagues financially, Vyaltseva was a strict mentor and chastised those prone to alcohol abuse. This brought her the reputation of something of a moralist in the Russian artistic community. An outspoken critic of the current tendency to use operetta as a sideshow to restaurant business, Vyaltseva in 1907 launched her own campaign for reviving the genre by stripping it of all associations with alcohol. Once in 1909 the Yakov Shchukin's Hermitage started to advertise champagne during her shows (without informing Vyaltseva who, they knew, would have protested), the singer quit the theatre she'd spent 12 years with. "Vyaltseva at home is the Turgenev-type woman, a real Liza from Home of the Gentry," wrote Orlovskaya Zhizn correspondent who visited the singer in her house.

In stark contrast with her extravagant stage persona, in real life Vyaltseva was a modest, economical woman, known to repair her old dresses. Despised by opera prima donnas, Vyaltseva was admired by choirgirls with whom she was on friendly terms. "While our France-touring divas were departing in personal carriages from rehearsals, Vyaltseva went home on foot or hired a street cabman," colleague Vladimir Krieger remembered. "Unlike many of her peers Vyaltseva proved herself eager to make personal sacrifices. Doors of her home were always open to those in need of help, she received hundreds of people every year," biographer Kizimova wrote. Pianist A.V.Taskin, who accompanied Vyaltseva for the last eight years of her career, remembered how nerve-wrecking for her was every performance, but still spoke of her as of a very pleasant person to work with. The singer's tactfulness and restraint were a matter of legends.

=== Illness and death ===
Anastasiya Vyaltseva was a superstitious and impressionable woman. When she was a choirgirl in Kiev, a seer predicted she would become famous but fall seriously ill in her prime, mentioning mysteriously "a black cloud dissected by a red thread." In mid-1912 before embarking upon what would be her final national tour, the singer, coming out of the house, was frightened by a huge black cloud above her; from then on she was often heard saying these concerts were going to be her swan song.

Vyaltseva's will
On 19 January 1913 Vyaltseva made a will, according to which all of her real estate and personal belonging should be sold after her death. 40 thousand rubles from the sum raised would have to go to her adopted son Yevgeny who'd get it by piecemeal percentages. As for the rest of the sum, the municipal authorities in the course of four years were to decide what it needed more, a maternity hospital bearing her name, or a hostel for orphans who were born illegitimately. In case of the city's failing to make an option, the sum should go to charities, supporting children from peasant families.
Vyaltseva's houses and plots of land proved to be worthy of 567.636 rubles. Her personal belongings, 1652 items, raised 151,852 rubles more at the auction. But the municipal authorities failed to use the money constructively. Yevgeny Kovsharov has got some of his payments, before committing suicide in 1914. According to the Bolshevik Government's commission's 1918 report, Vyaltseva's money has been embezzled by numerous agents and lawyers.

By this time Vyaltseva has been already seriously ill. In the summer of 1911 a doctor in Yalta diagnosed the singer with pleuritis and urged her to cancel the remaining shows. She ignored his demand and went on with touring. In the spring of 1912 on her return from her Volga tour Vyaltseva felt so bad, some of her shows in the Bouffe Theatre had to be cancelled. After several months’ rest in Kamenka, she went on tour again, first across the North-Western Russia, then going South. Vocally the singer was in fine form, but her physical condition worsened. In Kursk she fainted on stage. The doctor arrived, brought her to her senses and advised immediate hospitalization. Instead she returned to the stage and finished the show. After that, Vyaltseva gave 14 more concerts. The one in Voronezh had to be cancelled, after all: she managed a short address to the audience and was promptly transported to Saint Petersburg.

On 28 December 1912 the first reports of the singer's illness appeared in the Russian press. From then on, on a daily basis, the papers informed the public about the deteriorating condition of the singer, now diagnosed with leukemia, too. Traditional medicine experts arrived from Mongolia and Tibet but the singer’s relatives refused their help, opting for an Austrian specialist. Doctor Enderlen prescribed blood transfusion with Vasily Biskupsky as a donor, despite protests from two Petersburg surgeons, E. Pavlov and S. Fyodorov. The operation was performed by professor Plesch from Germany, to catastrophic effect: it turned out, husband and wife had different blood types. The second transfusion, now with another officer as a donor, proved fruitless.

Several medical interventions (involving the so-called "phosphoricide therapy") only worsened the singer's condition. On 4 February Anastasya Vyaltseva died. In the course of the next several days articles started to appear in the Russian press accusing doctors of bringing about the singer's demise. General-Lieutenant N.A.Rodnoy who'd just returned from London, told Novoye Vremya how his friends, professors from Britain and France couldn't believe their ears when he related to them the history of Vyaltseva's 'treatment'. Ilya Repin in his book of memoirs Distant Closeness (Dalyokoye blizkoye) described the medical manipulations with the dying singer as "naive experiments which would make even provincial interns blush."

The whole Russia seemed to bemoan the passing of the queen of Russian romance. As one of the papers, Ranneye Utro poised the question: "Why is Vyaltseva so important? When Anton Pavlovich Chekhov was dying, Russia wasn't following closely daily reports on his declining condition," another one, Peterburgskaya Gazeta retorted: "Chekhov lived and wrote for a minority. Vyaltseva was giving her talent to all of us." She was buried at the Nikolskoe Cemetery of the Alexander Nevsky Lavra.

== Private life ==
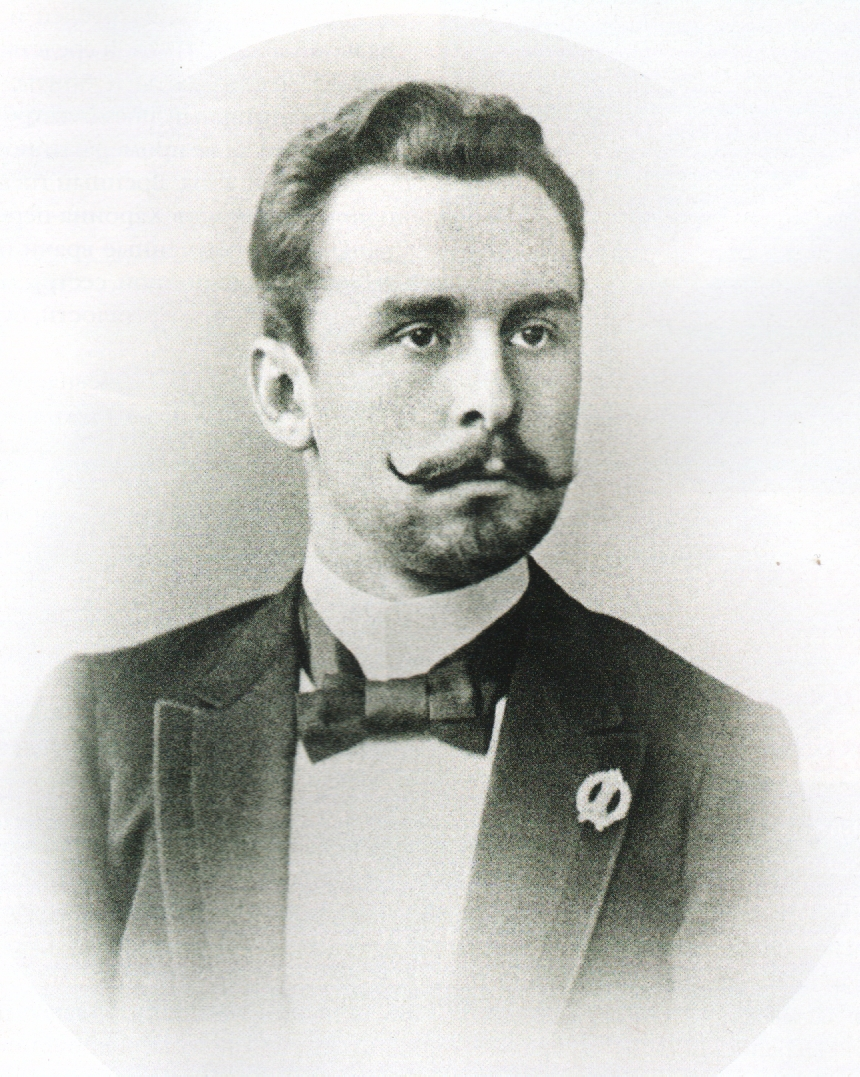
Nikolai Kholeva in 1890

Steeped in love and adoration, Vyaltseva was, admittedly, an unhappy woman. "I am terribly jealous when I see manifestations of real strong love," she was reported to complain. Her first partner was Nikolai Osipovich Kholeva (1859-1899), an affluent Petersburg barrister. A man of many talents (whose brain was examined after his death in the clinic of Professor Bekhterev, doctors looking for reasons for his intelligence, deemed phenomenal), Kholeva fell in love with a promising singer, sponsored her extensive educational program (involving a stint with professor Marti in Italy) and introduced her to the cultural and musical elite of the capital where her private performances caused furor. Anastasiya, deeply in love with her mentor, moved into his Petersburg flat (Kholeva had a family which lived in Kertch) and spent two years there. Then, having learned of her beloved one's numerous affairs, she rushed out from both the house and the capital, leaving all of his presents behind. She unwillingly returned to the city only after Kholeva's death in 1899.

In 1904 Vyaltseva became romantically linked with the Saint Petersburg officer Vasily Biskupsky, eight years her younger. After the Russo-Japanese War Colonel Biskupsky, now the head of Tsar Nikolas II's personal security unit, married Vyaltseva, thus violating the unwritten code of conduct. Summoned to the officers' court of honour, he was stripped of all awards and had no choice but to retire from the army, starting a new career as his wife's manager, never losing though, his links with the officer's community (notably, Pavlo Skoropadskyi, his friend, who helped him return to the army as World War I started). Biskupsky, an antipode to his strict, prudent wife, was causing her much moral suffering. Family scandals and behind the curtain theatre intrigues were the two reasons for Vyaltseva's incessant touring which for her was a form of escapism.

Vyaltseva loved children and easily developed strong bonds with them; she and six-year-old Vera Taskina, the daughter of Vyaltseva's pianist, became close friends and the singer carried with her Vera's photograph, considering it a lucky token. Vyaltseva adopted a boy, Yevgeny Kovsharov (whom she found, aged two months, in a basket under the bouquet of flowers, after one concert) and did everything to give him good care and education. Yevgeny committed suicide in 1914, two years after his stepmother's death. Vasily Biskupsky outlived his wife by 32 years.

== Legacy ==
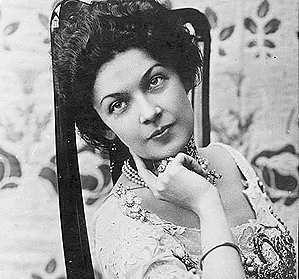
Anastasiya Vyaltseva in the early-1900s

Anastasya Vyaltseva was one of the most successful performers on the Russian popular music scene and a leading figure in the Russian romance genre. Following her performance at the Moscow Hermitage theatre in 1897, she quickly rose to prominence and developed a large following throughout Russia, which crossed social boundaries. The reason for her widespread appeal remained the subject of debate for many years.

Russian music critics praised Vyaltseva's sensuous voice, speaking of its "thick, natural and highly original timbre," reminiscent of "a lively cello" and compared her vocal style to that of Lina Cavalieri. Much has been made of Vyaltseva's fine diction, as well as her dramatic talent, stage charisma, "the magic power of gesture", the trademark 'Vyaltseva smile' and the 'hypnotic' effect the singer seemed to exert upon her audience.

The popular press supported Vyaltseva, calling the singer "the Seagull of the Russian popular music" and the "Russian Cinderella", often using the epithet Nesravnennaya (The Incomparable One). Reporters marveled at the seemingly artless manner in which she single-handedly turned hitherto unprepossessing section of the popular culture into a respected musical genre. Most agreed that she was a gifted actress who used stage for creating characters, rather than demonstrating her voice power and personal charisma, two qualities which were undeniably hers, too. Vyaltseva merged with her characters totally, which was something she obviously owed to her deep knowledge of Russian musical folklore.

Among the specialists, though, there were detractors. "Vyaltseva sings her romances with too much chastity, her style is clinically sterile and in a way too dry," critic V.P.Kolomiytsev opined. She has been called "high priestess of banality", while Vladimir Stasov hated her so passionately as to use mostly expletives while mentioning the singer and her style, not only in conversations, but in his letters.

There was the host of artists who dabbed themselves "the new Vyaltseva", first (in 1904) Leonova and Karinskaya, later, after the singer's death - V.M.Shuvalova who's bought Vyaltseva's wagon, hired Taskin and made the same hairdo. Unbelievably, among the "new Vyaltsevas" there were at least two male performers, N.F. Monakhov who successfully imitated not just her voice, but also her looks and manners, singing songs she popularized, and L.D. Leonidov.

Music historians argued that one of the reasons for Vyaltseva's phenomenal success was the fact that she emerged at the right time with the right kind of message, as 'a ray of light' in the dense, suffocating atmosphere of the post-1905 when pessimism and premonitions for horrible things to come were strong in Russia. "Not a single other person in the last 16-17 years has given so much warmth and joy to the people of Petersburg, as Vyaltseva," wrote Stepan Skitalets in 1913. "Sure, Vyaltseva performed only the Gypsy numbers and simple romances which haughty 'serious' musicians refused to recognize. But it is to the credit of her genius that by such simple means she managed to evoke the magic of Art and enliven our hearts," the writer continued.

With her 'sunny', 'springtime' look which contrasted with the darker imagery the ethnic Roma singers like Varya Panina conveyed, Vyaltseva "was the priestess of the triumphant love," as one critic put it. "Her sorrow was elegant and light in touch, her passion subtle rather than soul-tearing. The true queen of her genre, she represented... something nice and tender, like the breath of fresh air," he concluded. "People of younger generation were in love with the true People's singer Anastasiya Dmitrievna Vyaltseva. She entered our life and at some point defined the very essence of it," Sofja Giatsintova, the renown Soviet theatre actress and director remembered.

=== Memory ===
Two of Vyaltseva's houses (at Moyka, 22 and 24) remain, the others were demolished due to their poor condition. There is no Vyaltseva museum in Saint Petersburg, but there is one in Bryansk.
