= Kondraty Selivanov =

Founder of the Skoptsy Christian denomination (1730/40–1832)

- Кондрáтий Селивáнов
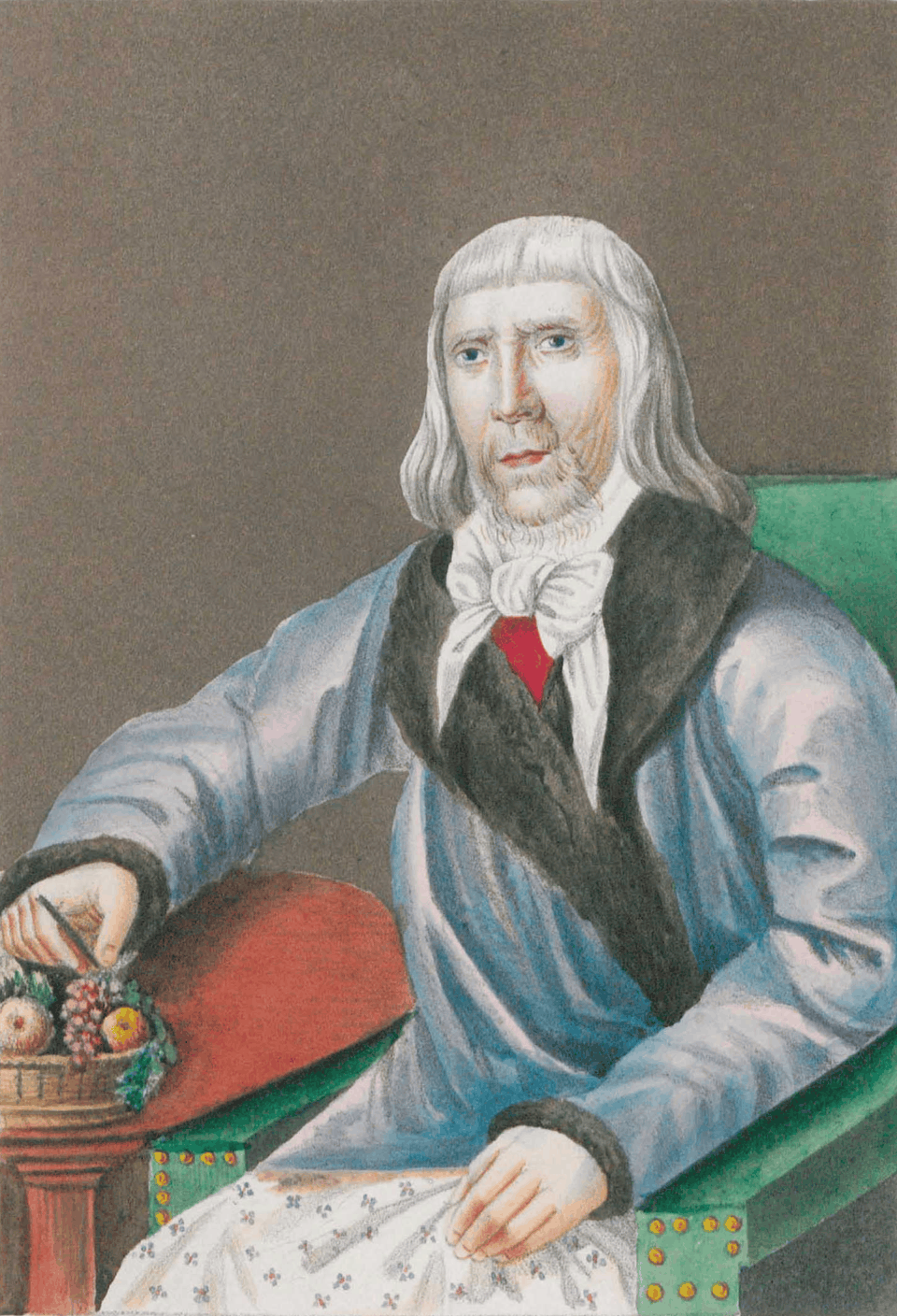
- Early 19th-century portrait of Selivanov

Personal life
- Born: 1730–1740
- Died: 1832 (age 91–102) Monastery of Saint Euthymius in Suzdal, Vladimir Oblast, Russian Empire
- Main interests: Removal of sex organs and breasts; Reincarnation; Eschatology
- Occupation: Preacher

Religious life
- Religion: Christianity
- Movement: Spiritual Christianity; Skoptsy

Kondraty Selivanov (Russian: Кондрáтий Селивáнов; 1730/40–1832) was a Russian religious leader who was one of the founders of the Skoptsy, a Spiritual Christian sect whose members practiced castration as a means of achieving salvation. He was worshipped by the members of the sect as a second Christ and redeemer and as Peter III, the Russian emperor who was overthrown and assassinated in 1762.

== Origin and early activities ==
Contradictory reports exist about Selivanov's date of birth and his real name. According to Selivanov's own testimony, he was about five years old during the reign Peter I (r. 1682–1725) and castrated himself in the fourteenth year of his life, during the reign of Empress Anna (r. 1730–1740); but this is unlikely as it would mean that he died about 120 years after his birth. He was reportedly about 35 years old when he was arrested in 1775. The Orthodox Encyclopedia gives the date range of 1730–1740 for his birth. He may have used, at various times, the names Andreyan, Foma, Ivan, or Andrey.

The Skoptsy emerged as a breakaway movement within the Khlysts—a preceding Russian sect—at the end of the 1760s. Their earliest documented appearance is in an investigation conducted in the Orlovsky Uyezd (county) in 1772, which resulted in the arrest of 60 people, about half of whom had been castrated. The investigation identified three leaders of the movement: the escaped serfs Andrey Ivanov Blokhin and Kondraty Nikiforov (sometimes called Trifonov or Trofimov); and Mikhayla Nikulin, a Khlyst preacher. The Khlyst leader Akulina Ivanova, likewise an escaped serf, also played an active role in the new sect. After his arrest, Blokhin testified that he had been instructed a few years earlier by Nikulin, who told him that, in addition to the other abstinences practiced by the Khlysts, he must castrate himself in order to achieve salvation. Blokhin and his friend Kondraty Nikiforov castrated themselves (Note: Blokhin stated that he castrated Kondraty as the latter was too afraid to do it himself.) and went on to castrate a number of peasants, possibly as many as 62, in the neighbouring villages before being discovered by the authorities.

At Catherine the Great's order, the new heresy was prosecuted as a civil, not religious, case and only the alleged ringleaders were punished. Blokhin and Nikulin were physically punished and deported to labour colonies, but Kondraty Nikiforov avoided capture. Nikiforov, a runaway serf from the village of Stolbishche (or Stolbov), on the Kantemir estate in the Sevsky Uyezd of the Oryol Governorate, was Blokhin's companion from their days as wandering beggars. Most likely, Kondraty Nikiforov adopted the surname Selivanov and became the leader of the Skoptsy movement. (Note: Some authors suggest that Kondraty Nikiforov was the same person as Andrey Ivanov and that Andrey's companion was Martyn Rodionov, or that Martyn and Andrei shared the name Kondraty. (Martyn is known only from Selivanov's own writings and Skoptsy traditions.) N. V. Reutsky thought that Andrey Ivanov may have adopted the name Selivanov, which was common in the region. Since family names and patronymics were not fully regularized in this period, commoners were frequently confused with one another.) After escaping capture in 1772, Selivanov preached in the Tula Governorate, where he was known as the "Kievan hermit" (kievsky zatvornik). At this time, his associates were most likely the beggar Martyn Rodionov (known only from Selivanov's own writings and Skoptsy traditions) and the peasant Alexander Ivanovich Shilov, who was later regarded as the "forerunner of the Skoptsy". In the Tula Governorate, the Skoptsy converted several people at a linen factory, including the owner. The movement subsequently spread to the Tambov Governorate. In 1775, Shilov and Selivanov were living in the village of Sosnovka in the house of the Skoptsy follower Sofon Popov. That same year, another investigation into the movement was launched. Selivanov and Shilov were discovered and arrested. Selivanov was punished with the knout and exiled to Nerchinsk in Siberia, while Shilov and around nine others were exiled to Riga.

Selivanov preached castration as the only route to salvation and viewed himself as the re-embodiment of the original Christ the Redeemer. Whereas the Khlysts believed that there have been many Christs throughout history, the Skoptsy believed that there were only two Christs: Jesus and Selivanov. In Selivanov's hagiography, he is hailed by Akulina Ivanova as "Lord and Father" (gosudar batyushka) and "Father Redeemer" (Otets iskupitel). (Note: According to the 1772 investigation, around 1770 Akulina Ivanova had recognized someone called Pavel Petrov as Christ, but this person was never found.) While in exile in Siberia or upon his return thence, Selivanov also began to claim to be Peter III, the Russian emperor who was overthrown and assassinated in 1762.

== Return from exile and later life ==
In 1797, Selivanov returned to European Russia. How exactly this occurred is unclear, but according to scholar Alexander Panchenko it was probably connected with the revival of rumors after Catherine the Great's death that Peter III was still alive. According to an 1803 memorandum by Cabinet Secretary Dmitry Troshchinsky, which is apparently based on Selivanov's own testimony, Selivanov was denounced by another exile who convinced him to call himself Peter III, after which he was taken away from Siberia and interviewed by Emperor Paul I himself. (Paul was influenced to some degree by stories about the miraculous survival of his father.) Other 19th-century accounts also record a meeting between Paul I and Selivanov, as well as a later interview with Paul's successor Alexander I.

In 1797, Selivanov was placed in the Obukhov Correctional House in Saint Petersburg. In 1802, he was placed in the almshouse at Smolny Monastery. He was released from the latter at the request of A. M. Yelensky, a resident of the Alexander Nevsky Monastery and the first nobleman to join the Skoptsy. During his life in Saint Petersburg, Selivanov became known as a spiritual teacher both among merchants and in noble circles. He enjoyed the patronage of a group of Petersburg merchants, including the brothers Sidor and Ivan Nenastyev, in whose home he resided until 1811. The Skoptsy movement continued to grow, and Selivanov led large radeniya (Note: The ritual ecstatic dances practiced by the Khlysts and Skoptsy.) in the capital and its suburbs. Tsar Alexander I sent Prince Alexander Golitsyn to speak with Selivanov, who reportedly promised to discourage castration, although "these were surely empty words." According to the memoirs of the statesman Fyodor Lubyanovsky, Selivanov was visited by the Tsar not long before the Battle of Austerlitz and prophesied about the war with Napoleon. In 1815, Selivanov became acquainted with Yekaterina Tatarinova, who in 1817 began holding religious gatherings in her home, which were attended by some famous members of Russian high society, including Prince Golitsyn. Tatarinova's gatherings drew from some of the songs and practices of the Khlysts and Skoptsy, including the ritual of radeniye. Another attempt by the government to dissuade Selivanov from his teachings, this time through another member of Tatarinova's circle, Martyn Urbanovich-Piletsky, was likewise unsuccessful.

While initially trying to use persuasion with Selivanov, the Russian state under Alexander I used repressive measures against his followers. However, the government's attitude changed as news spread about the growth of the Skoptsy movement in the Russian capital, including among sailors and lower-ranking members of the Imperial Guard. Additionally, in 1819 it was revealed that two relatives of Count Mikhail Miloradovich, then governor general of Saint Petersburg, had become followers of Selivanov, with one of them agreeing to be castrated. In the summer of 1820, he was confined in the Monastery of Saint Euthymius in Suzdal. There, he was kept under constant guard and was not allowed to receive visitors. Nevertheless, it is likely that Selivanov maintained contact with his followers. His actions were reported on to the provincial authorities and the ministry of internal affairs by the abbot of the monastery, Archimandrite Parfeny. According to Parfeny's letters, Selivanov confessed and received communion frequently, although, by his own admission, he had not received communion for seventeen years before his arrest.

Selivanov died at the monastery in 1832. His grave has not been preserved. After Selivanov's death, the Skoptsy adopted the belief that Selivanov had not really died and that he would return and start the thousand-year reign of Christ once 144,000 people had been castrated (their interpretation of Revelation 7:4). There are several portraits of Selivanov, which were kept in the icon corners of Skoptsy homes along with Orthodox icons.

== Works ==
Some parts of Selivanov's life are reflected in the texts of his hagiography, consisting of two parts, Strady ("Passion" or "Sufferings") and Pokhozhdeniya ("Wanderings"), and collectively called the Passion of Kondraty Selivanov or simply the Passion. The Passion is described by historian Laura Engelstein as "in tone a mix of prayer and fairy tale". It describes his sufferings while fleeing from the authorities, his capture, punishment, and exile, as well as his conversion of people to his cause. It is alleged in the hagiography that Selivanov was betrayed to the authorities by the Khlysts, who were angry with him for abandoning their sect; this is compared in the text with Jesus' betrayal and crucifixion. To his followers, Selivanov's sufferings were proof that he was the returned Christ.

The Passion played an important role in the liturgical practices of the Skoptsy—in Panchenko's view, likely from Selivanov's death in the 1830s. Thе Passion is written from Selivanov's perspective and is addressed to his followers (his "dear beloved children"). However, Engelstein considers it unlikely that Selivanov himself authored these texts. In her view, the texts could have been written by his followers on the basis of stories that Selivanov had told them. (Most sources indicate that Selivanov was illiterate, but some sources indicate that he could write.) Further, she writes, "Because Selivanov had access to St. Petersburg high society when mystical religion was all the rage in the beau monde, it is not impossible that the literary version of his story was the invention or elaboration of an amateur of folklore. It may have benefited from the creative efforts of the eminent folklorist Vladimir Dalʹ (1801–72), who wrote the first draft of the official report [on the Skoptsy]." Panchenko disagrees with Engelstein's last assertion.

== Bibliography ==
- Buss, Andreas (2010). The Russian-Orthodox Tradition and Modernity. Leiden: Brill. ISBN 978-90-04-13324-2.
- Conybeare, Frederick C. (1921). Russian Dissenters. Harvard Theological Studies. Cambridge, MA: Harvard University Press.
- Engelstein, Laura (1999). Castration and the Heavenly Kingdom: A Russian Folktale. Ithaca, NY: Cornell University Press. ISBN 978-0-8014-3676-5.
- Panchenko, A. A. (2002). Khristovshchina i skopchestvo: Folʹklor i traditsionnaia kulʹtura russkikh misticheskikh sekt Христовщина и скопчество: Фольклор и традиционная культура русских мистических сект [Khristovshchina and skopchestvo: folklore and traditional culture of the Russian mystical sects] (in Russian). Obʺedinënnoe Gumanitarnoe Izdatelʹstvo. ISBN 978-5-94282-106-7.
- Sergazina, K. T. (22 April 2026). "Skoptsy" Скопцы. Pravoslavnaia ėntsiklopediia (in Russian) (Online ed.).
- Vysotsky, N. G. (1913). "Iz nachalnoi istorii skopchestva" Изъ начальной исторіи скопчества [From the initial history of Skopchestvo]. Russkii arkhiv (in Russian) (10–12): 566–578.
