= Alexander Shilov =

Alexander Shilov may refer to:

- Alexander E. Shilov (1930–2014), Russian chemist
- Alexander Ivanovich Shilov (died 1799), one of the founders of the Skoptzy sect
- Alexandr Shilov (born 1943), Soviet and Russian portrait painter
