= Shilov =

- Romanization: Shilov
- Gender: Masculine
- Language: Russian

Other gender
- Feminine: Shilova

Origin
- Origin: Russian: шило
- Meaning: awl

Shilov (Russian: Шилов) is a widespread family name among Russians. It is derived from the word "шило", awl. Notable people of this name include:

- Alexander Ivanovich Shilov (?-1799), one of the founders of the Skoptzy sect
- Alexander Maxovich Shilov (b. 1943), prominent Russian portrait painter
- Alexander Yevgenyevich Shilov (1930–2014), Soviet expert in physical chemistry
- Georgii Evgen'evich Shilov (1917–1975), Soviet mathematician and expert in functional analysis
- Igor Alexandrovich Shilov (1921-?), Soviet biologist ecologist
- Nikolay Alexandrovich Shilov (1872–1930), Russian expert in physical chemistry
- Sergei Evgenevich Shilov (b. 1969), notable Russian writer and essayist
- Vassily Shilov, a Russian explorer and merchant who created the first map of the Aleutian Islands in 1763
