= Skoptsy =

Imperial Russian sect of Spiritual Christianity

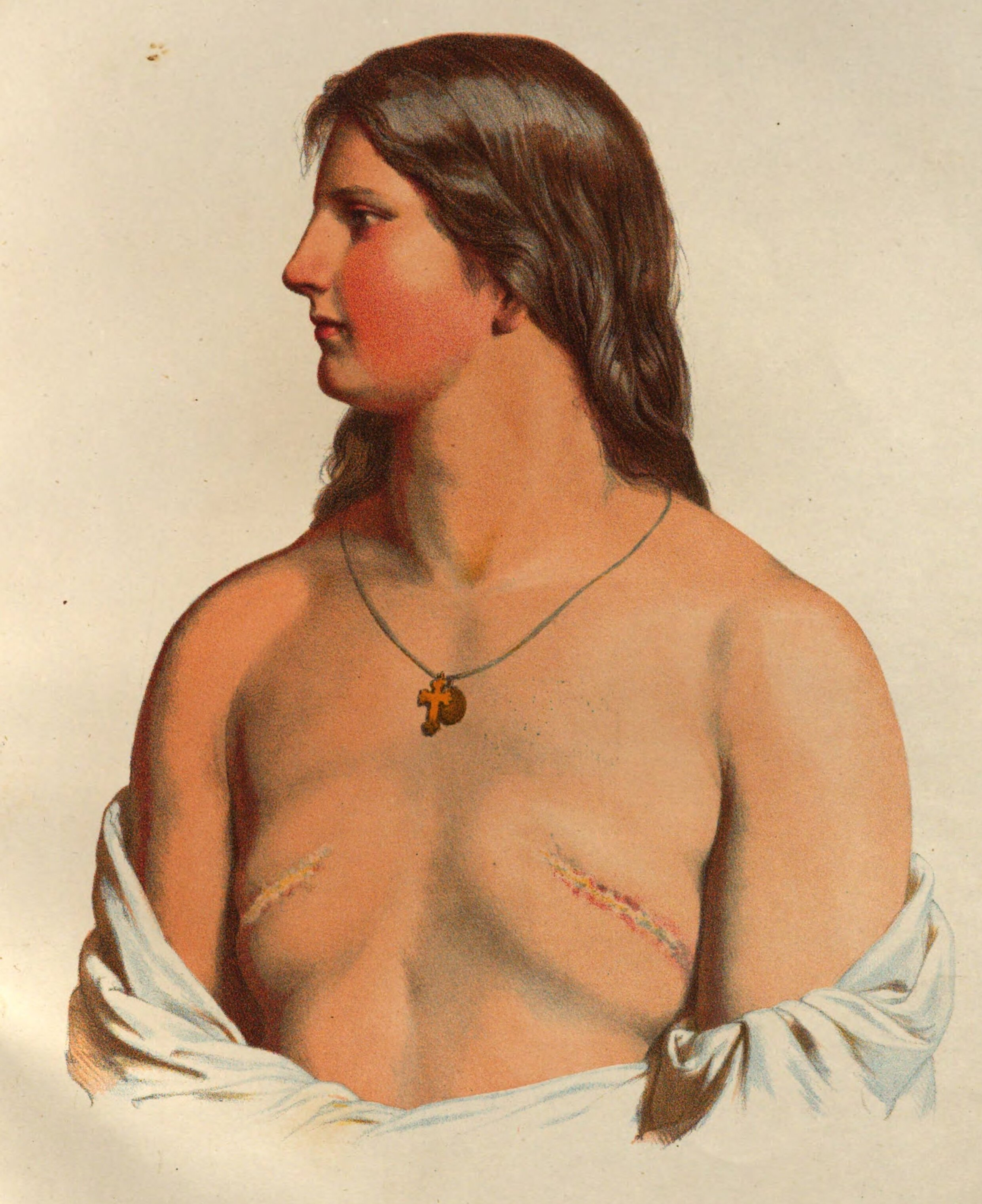
Skoptsy woman having undergone a mastectomy

The Skoptsy (Note: Often self referred to as True Christians or the Godly.) (Russian: скопцы, lit. 'eunuchs', Russian pronunciation: [skɐpˈtsɨ]) were a Spiritual Christian sect of Eastern Orthodoxy. They were best known for practising the emasculation of men, the mastectomy and the female genital mutilation of women in accordance with their teachings against sexual lust. The descriptive term "Skoptsy" was coined by the Russian Orthodox Church which regarded the sect as heretical.

The sect emerged in the late 18th century. It reached the peak of its popularity in the early 20th century at about 100,000 members, though it’s unclear what percentage of the membership underwent their characteristic surgical procedures. The group was essentially wiped out by the Soviet Union under Joseph Stalin.

== Beliefs and practices ==
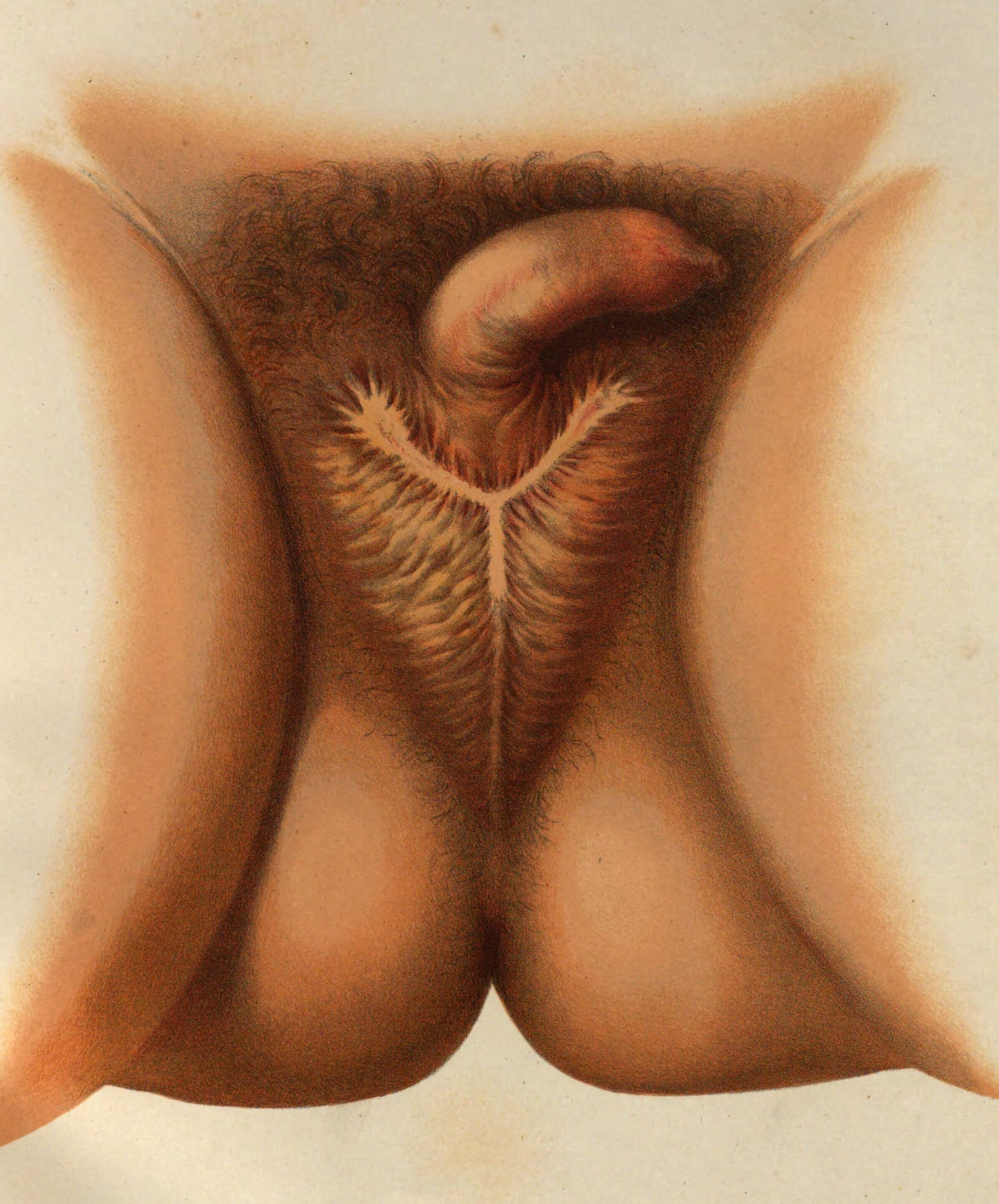
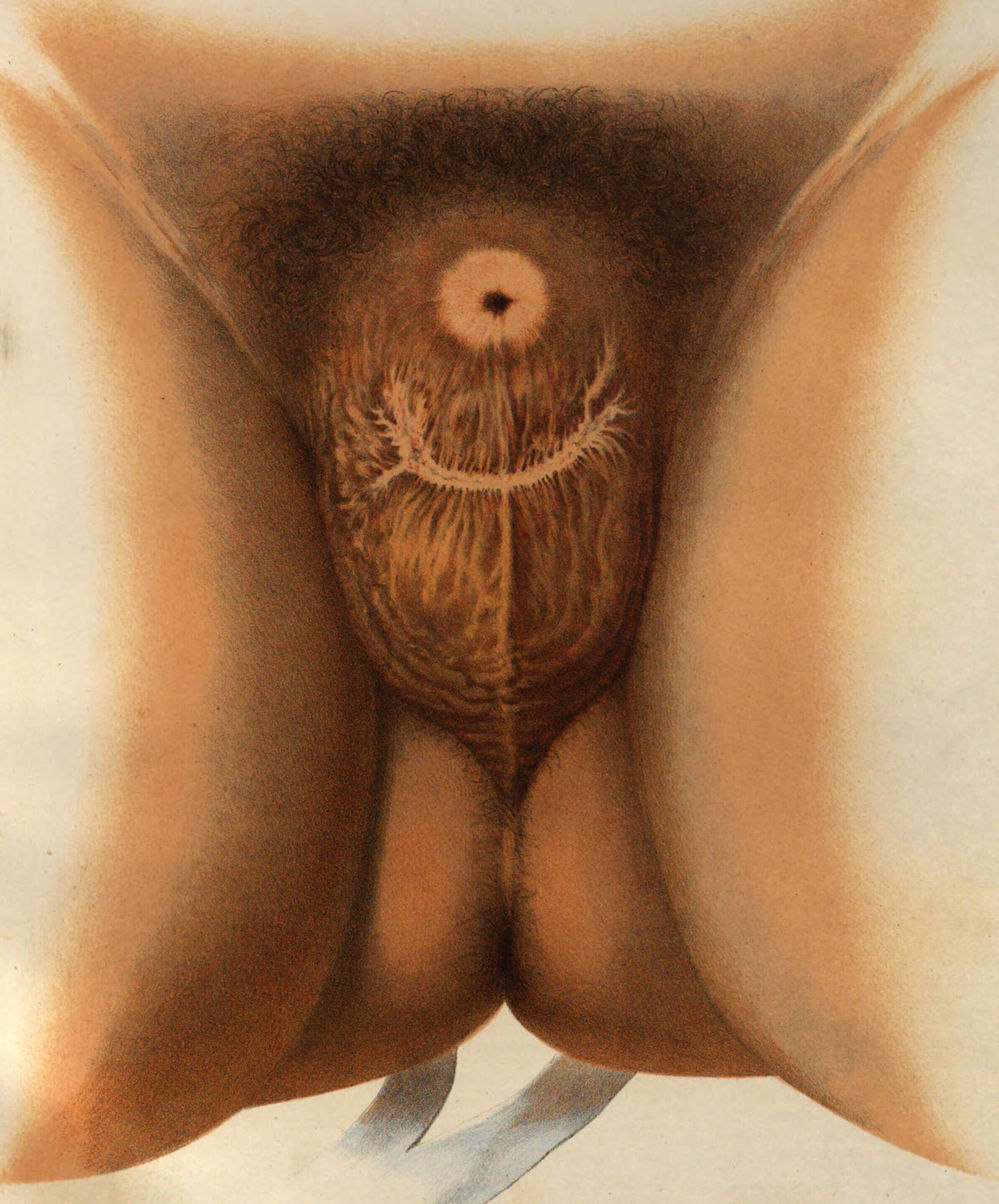
Genitals of Skoptsy men, "lesser seal" (left) and "greater seal" (right).

The aim of the Skoptsy was to end original sin, which they believed had come into the world by the first coitus between Adam and Eve. They believed that human genitals were the true mark of Cain, and that the true message of Jesus Christ included the practice of castration. As a result, they believed that Jesus himself had been a castrate, and that his example had been followed by the apostles and the early Christian saints. The Skoptsy worshipped their founder Kondraty Selivanov as the second Christ and, after his death, adopted the belief that Selivanov would return and start the thousand-year reign of Christ once 144,000 people had been castrated (their interpretation of Revelation 7:4). (Note: Revelation 7:4: "And I heard the number of them which were sealed: and there were sealed an hundred and forty and four thousand of all the tribes of the children of Israel.")

It is unclear what originally inspired the practice of self-castration, though it may have been derived from the circumcision practiced by Jews and Muslims. According to one view, the Skoptsy emerged as a reaction to occasional instances of sexual relations between the Khlysty (a preceding sect) after their ecstatic dances or with their "spiritual sister". (Note: Unmarried Khlysty were often permitted to take a "spiritual sister" to act as a wife; however, the relationship was supposed to be platonic.) Ecclesiastical historian Diarmaid MacCulloch, believes that the practice originated in a mistranslation by founder Kondraty Selivanov of a biblical command in Genesis 1:28 as плотитесь ("castrate yourselves") rather than плодитесь ("be fruitful"). The Skoptsy themselves supported the practice with biblical passages such as Matthew 19:12, (Note: Matthew 19:12: "For there are some eunuchs, which were so born from their mother's womb: and there are some eunuchs, which were made eunuchs of men: and there be eunuchs, which have made themselves eunuchs for the kingdom of heaven's sake. He that is able to receive it, let him receive it.") Matthew 18:8–9, (Note: Matthew 18:8–9: "Wherefore if thy hand or thy foot offend thee, cut them off, and cast them from thee: it is better for thee to enter into life halt or maimed, rather than having two hands or two feet to be cast into everlasting fire. And if thine eye offend thee, pluck it out, and cast it from thee: it is better for thee to enter into life with one eye, rather than having two eyes to be cast into hell fire.") and Luke 23:29. (Note: Luke 23:29: "For, behold, the days are coming, in the which they shall say, Blessed are the barren, and the wombs that never bare, and the paps which never gave suck.") They also cited the purported self-castration of Origen, whose reading of Matthew had been rejected by the Orthodox Church. However, it is unknown if these passages and examples inspired the original Skoptsy, or were only referenced post hoc.

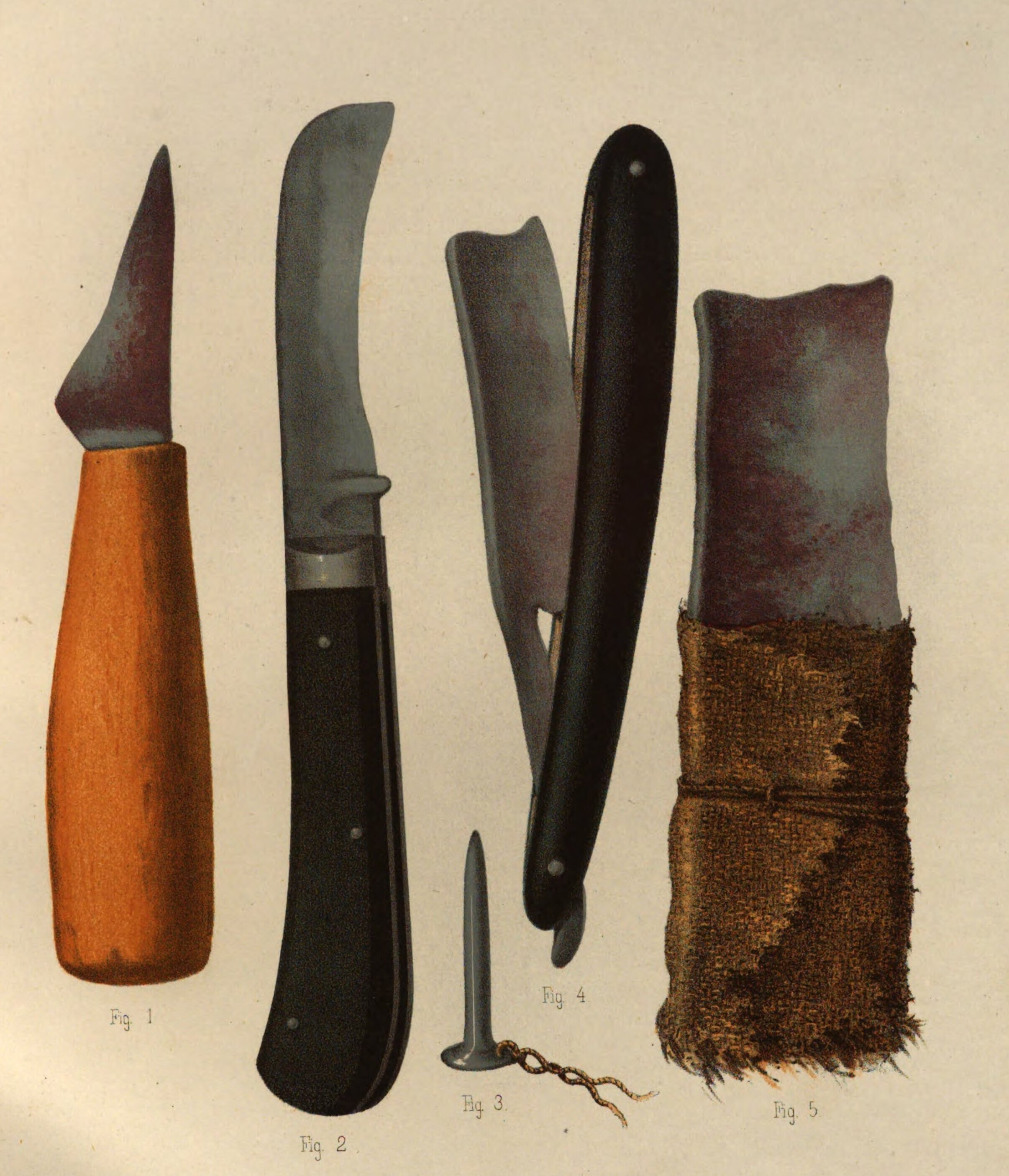
Tools commonly used for castration

Skoptsy men could undergo two kinds of castration, the "lesser seal", which involved the removal of the testicles, and the "greater seal", removal of both penis and testicles. The castrations and emasculations were originally performed with a red-hot iron, called the 'fiery baptism'. However, the Skoptsy later transitioned to using knives or razors, with the iron serving only to stop the bloodflow. Castration was also occasionally performed by twisting the scrotum, destroying the seminal vesicles to stop the flow of semen. Skoptsy women had their nipples or their entire breasts removed, or scarred the sides of their breasts. They also removed the labia majora, and often the labia minora and clitoris. The operations were generally performed in isolated areas by elders in a ceremony, though some opted to perform on themselves. During the operation, they said the phrase "Christ is risen!"

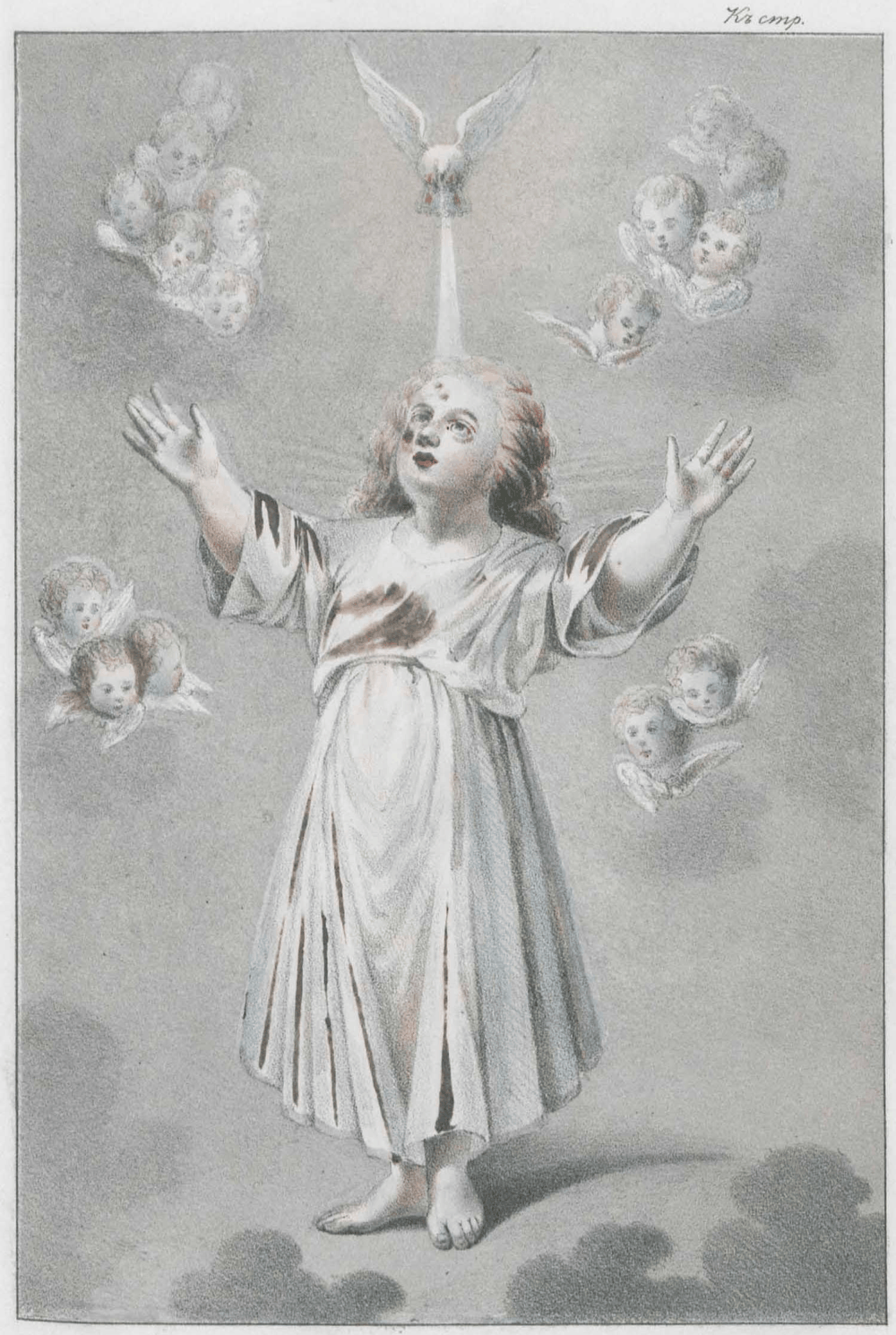
Skoptsy icon of a youth, using doves and angels as religious motifs

Besides castration, the Skoptsy inherited all their beliefs and practices from the Khlysty, such as an abstinence from indulgences such as alcohol, profanity, and sex. They also adopted the ritual of radenie, an ecstatic practice of singing and dancing, though it was not considered sacramental as it was among the Khlysty.

Like the Khlysty, the Skoptsy believed that religious achievements are devalued if revealed to other people. Thus, the Skoptsy were required to lie to outsiders to keep hidden the practice of castration and the veneration of their founder, Selivanov. It is even possible that not all members of the sect knew about the practice of castration.

== History ==
=== Emergence ===
The Skoptsy emerged as a breakaway movement within the Khlysts at the end of the 1760s. The earliest documentation of the sect is in an investigation conducted in the Orlovsky Uyezd (county) in 1772, which resulted in the arrest of 60 people, about half of whom had been castrated. The investigation identified three leaders of the movement: the escaped serfs Andrey Ivanov Blokhin and Kondraty Nikiforov (sometimes called Trifonov or Trofimov); and Mikhayla Nikulin, a Khlyst preacher. The Khlyst leader Akulina Ivanova, likewise an escaped serf, also played an active role in the new sect. After his arrest, Blokhin testified that he had been instructed a few years earlier by Nikulin, who told him that, in addition to the other abstinences practiced by the Khlysts, he must castrate himself in order to achieve salvation. Blokhin and his friend Kondraty Nikiforov castrated themselves and went on to castrate a number of peasants, possibly as many as 62, in the neighbouring villages before being discovered by the authorities. (Note: There are varying reports about how the sect was discovered. Some sources claim that a resident of the village of Maslov discovered while bathing with a neighbour that the neighbour had castrated himself, and reported the incident to the town priest. Others identify the discoverer as a landowner who learned that thirteen of his serfs had castrated themselves. The scholar Laura Engelstein writes that the former account may reflect a failed recruitment attempt, or a conflict between the Khlysts and the breakaway Skoptsy.)

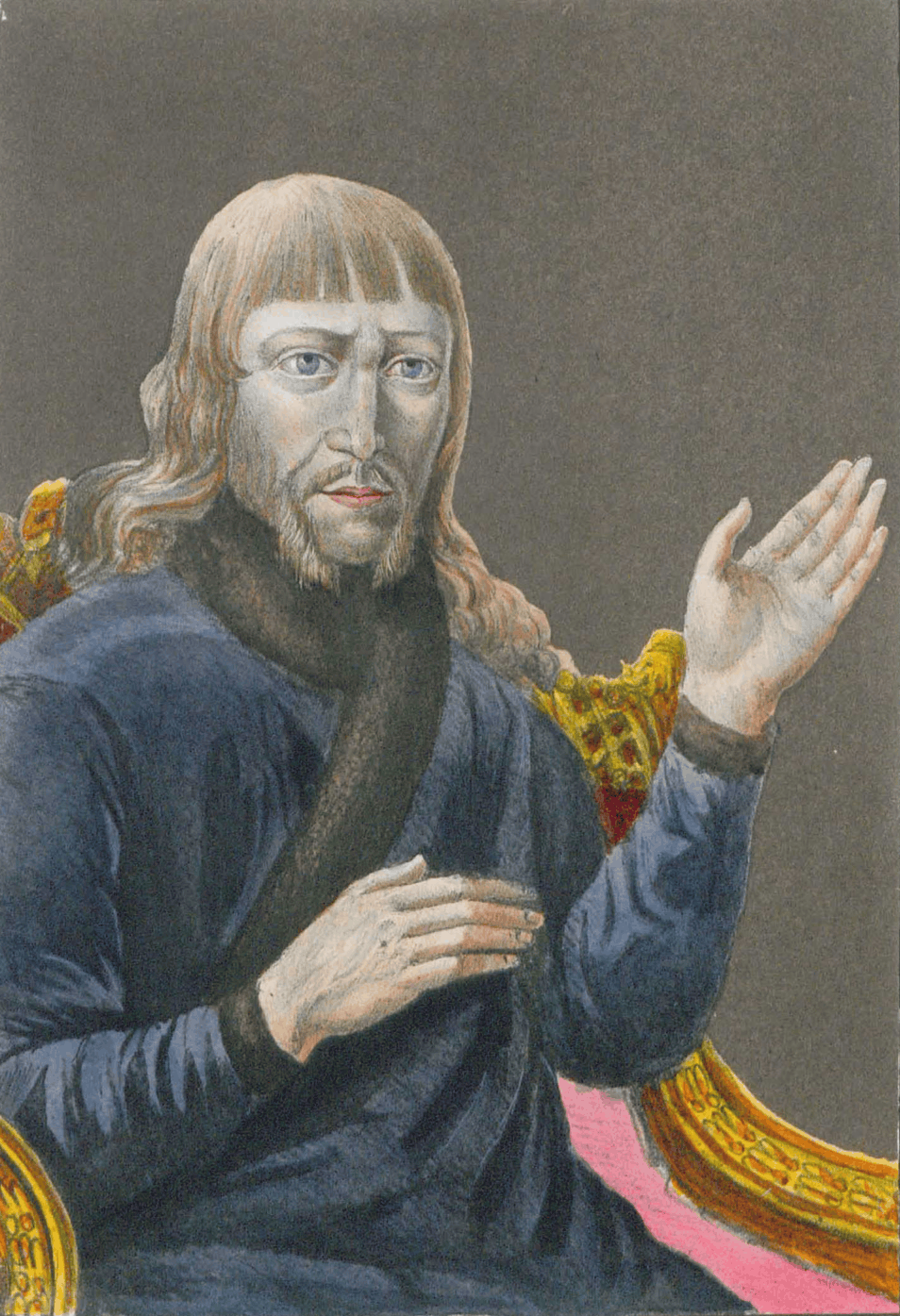
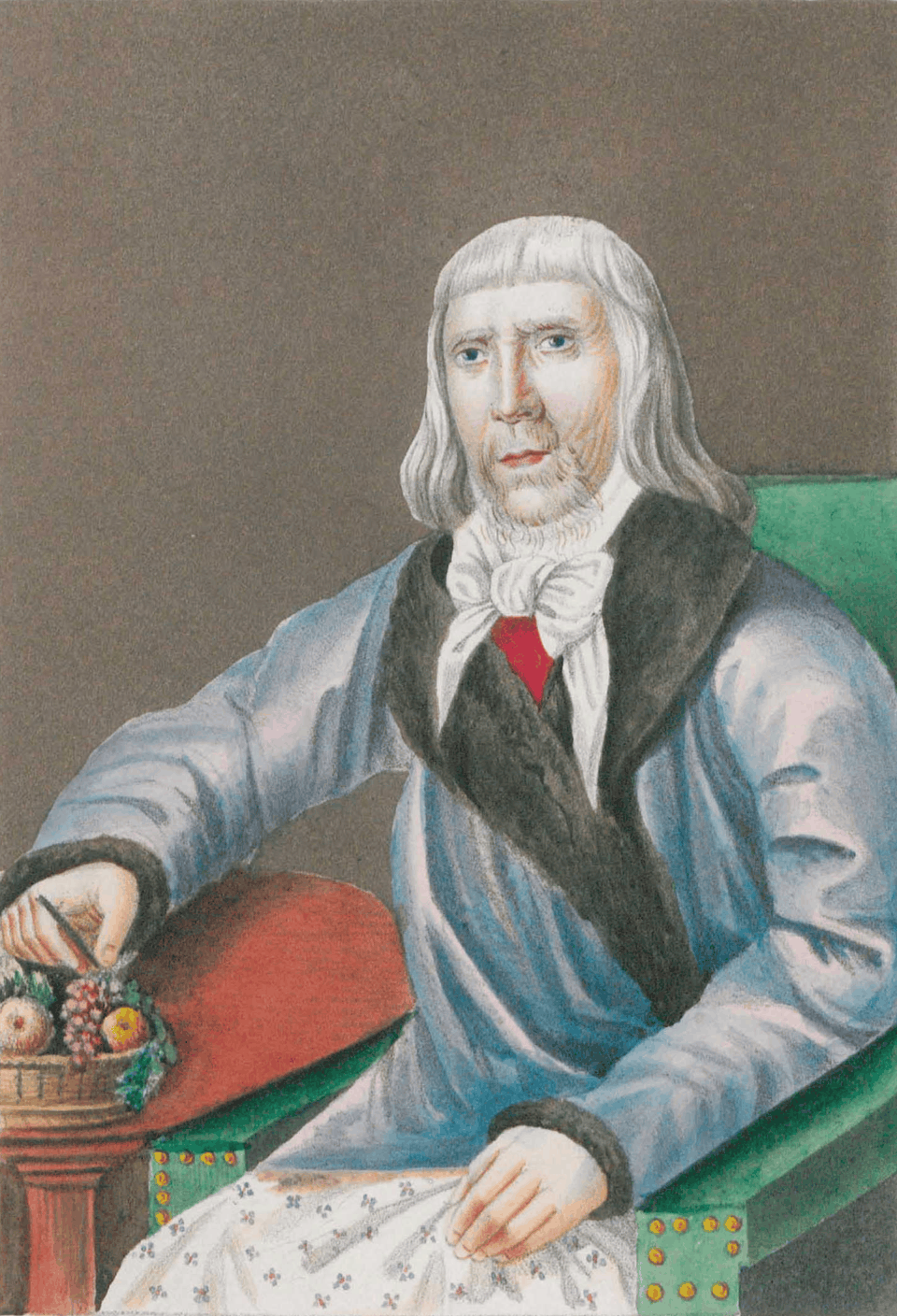
Alexander Ivanovich Shilov (left) and Kondraty Selivanov (right). Engravings from the 19th century.

By Catherine the Great's order, the new heresy was prosecuted as a civil, not religious, case and only the alleged ringleaders were punished. Blokhin and Nikulin were physically punished and deported to labour colonies, but Kondraty Nikiforov and Akulina Ivanova avoided capture. It is likely that Kondraty Nikiforov became Kondraty Selivanov, the eventual leader of the Skoptsy who was worshipped within the sect as Christ and the assassinated Russian emperor Peter III. After escaping capture in 1772, Kondraty preached in the Tula Governorate. At this time, his associates were most likely the pauper Martyn Rodionov (known only from Selivanov's own writings and Skoptsy traditions) and the peasant Alexander Ivanovich Shilov, who was later regarded as the "forerunner of the Skoptsy". In the Tula Governorate, the Skoptsy converted several people at a linen factory, including the owner. The movement subsequently spread to the Tambov Governorate. In 1775, another investigation into the movement was launched. Shilov and Selivanov were discovered and arrested. Selivanov was punished with the knout and exiled to Nerchinsk in Siberia, while Shilov and around nine others were exiled to Riga.

Despite repression by the state, the Skoptsy movement continued to grow, even expanding beyond the central provinces of Russia. Shilov led the Skoptsy community in Riga, and the sect also spread to the southern suburbs of Saint Petersburg. In the 1790s, the sect, originally a peasant phenomenon, began to attract members from among merchants and city-dwellers. In 1797, Selivanov returned to European Russia under unclear circumstances. (Note: According to Panchenko, Selivanov's return was probably connected with the revival of rumors after Catherine the Great's death that Peter III was still alive. According to an 1803 memorandum by Cabinet Secretary Dmitry Troshchinsky, which is apparently based on Selivanov's own testimony, Selivanov was denounced by another exile who convinced him to call himself Peter III, after which he was taken away from Siberia and interviewed by Emperor Paul I.) He and Shilov were reportedly questioned by Emperor Paul I, who was influenced to some degree by stories about the miraculous survival of his father. Shilov and five other Skoptsy were imprisoned in Schlüsselburg Fortress, while Selivanov was confined to the Obukhov mental asylum in Saint Petersburg. Shilov died in prison in 1799, while Selivanov was released from confinement in 1802 at the request of A. M. Yelensky, apparently the first nobleman to join the Skoptsy.

Selivanov succeeded in gaining followers even among the upper classes of Saint Petersburg. When Governor General of Saint Petersburg Mikhail Miloradovich, learned that two of his nephews, as well as several members of the guards regiments and sailors, were members of the sect, he asked the imperial government to intervene. Selivanov again came to government's attention for an unknown reason in 1820, and he was confined to the Monastery of Saint Euthymius in Suzdal. Selivanov remained in the monestary until his death in 1832. Selivanov left writings of debated origin, known under the titles Poslaniye (Послание, 'Epistle') and Strady (Страды, 'Passion' or 'Sufferings'), After Selivanov's death, the Skoptsy adopted the belief that Selivanov had not really died and that he would return and start the thousand-year reign of Christ once 144,000 people had been castrated (their interpretation of Revelation 7:4).

=== After Selivanov ===
Shortly into his service as Minister of Internal Affairs, Lev Perovski took interest in the idea that Russian schismatics at home and abroad may take up arms against Russia during a war. Due to the discovery of a Skoptsy molennaya ('prayer room') in Saint Petersburg in 1843, the Skoptsy were the first sect to be investigated. Perovski's protégés Vladimir Dal and Nikolai Nadezhdin led the investigation, publishing several memorandums from 1843 to 1845 which were presented to Nicholas I of Russia and other government bodies. This work culminated in a 1844 book by Dahl and derivative 1845 book by Nadezhdin, though only the latter was published as Nicholas objected to Dal's Danish surname and Lutheran faith. Dal and Nadezhdin compared Selivanov to Yemelyan Pugachev, who lead a mass uprising against the government while claiming to be Peter III, similarly to Selianov. While Selivanov had died, the Skopskys belief that he was still alive meant they would view the successors that ruled Russia as illegitimate. Dal and Nadezhdin argued that the Skoptsy should be "eradicated" due to the danger they posed to Russia, possibly through exile to Muslim regions of the empire where they would not be able to convert anyone. These additional measures would not be put into effect however, due to focus shifting onto the priested Old Believers.

Despite the furious investigations of the Tsarist government's secret police, the Skoptsy did not disappear after Selivanov's death, and scandals continued to arise. The sect established a presence in Saint Petersburg, Moscow, Morshansk and Odessa, and later in Bucharest and Iași in Romania, where members of the sect had fled due to the persecution by Russian authorities. By 1866, the sect was reported as having 5,444 members (3,979 men and 1,465 women). Although the Skoptsy prescribed castration as a precondition for entering paradise, only a minority of members (703 men and 100 women) had undergone bodily mutilation. Alexandre Dumas, père, writes about the sect, calling them scopsis, towards the end of his account of his journey through Caucasia, Le Caucase, Memoires d'un Voyage (1858), where he met them in Georgia. In the book The Idiot, Fyodor Dostoevsky mentions that the home of Parfyon Semyonovich Rogozhin is rented to Skoptsy tenants. Dostoevsky also mentions Skoptsy in the 1872 novel Demons and the 1880 novel The Brothers Karamazov. Leo Tolstoy corresponded with the Skoptsy member Gavriil Menshenin, whom he knew personally from 1900. In an 1897 letter to Menshenin, Tolstoy explained his opposition to the Skoptsy's practice of castration.

Map of the Skoptsy population in Russia from 1840–1859 (left) and 1860–1870 (right)
8,000
5,000-8,000
3,000-5,000
2,000-3,000
1,000-2,000
100-1,000
100

Repressive measures were tried along with ridicule: male Skoptsy were dressed in women's clothes and paraded wearing fools' caps through the villages. In 1876, 130 Skoptsy were deported. To escape prosecution some of the sect emigrated, mostly to Romania, where some of them mixed with old-believer exiles known as Lipovans. Romanian writer I.L. Caragiale acknowledges that toward the end of the 19th century all the horse-powered cabs in Bucharest were driven by Russian Skoptsy (Scopiți in Romanian). Though the law was strict in Russia—every eunuch was compelled to register—the Skoptsy movement did not abate in its popularity. The Skoptsy became known as moneylenders, and a bench known as the "Skoptsy's Bench" stood in Saint Petersburg for many years.

The Skoptsy may have had as many as 100,000 followers in the early 20th century, although repression continued and members of the sect were put on trial. Increased repression and collectivization under the Soviet Union reduced the numbers to a reported few thousand in 1929, when the authorities staged a widely publicized mass trial against the sect.

Leon Trotsky, in a report from Romania in 1913, wrote about the Skoptsy in the Dobruja region who worked as horse-cab drivers and played a predominant role in the local horse trade. Patrick Leigh Fermor in The Broken Road describes his encounters (in 1933/4) with two "Skapetz" (sic) in a Bucharest tavern and as a passenger in their horse-drawn cabs: "They conversed in oddly high-pitched voices in a language that sounded at first like Bulgarian but soon turned out to be—judging by its shifting vowels and liquid sounds—Russian."

Olivia Manning in The Great Fortune (1960) describes the Skoptsy carriage drivers of Bucharest based on her visit in 1939.

=== After the October Revolution ===
After the Bolsheviks seized power during the October Revolution, they focused on weakening the Russian Orthodox Church and the influence of religion, as they posed threats to the authority of the new government. Many early Bolshevik decrees, such as stripping the Orthodox Church of its privileges and asserting the equality of different religions indirectly strengthened the Russian minority sects, including the Skoptsy, by removing the tools previously used to suppress them. Vladimir Bonch-Bruyevich, a power broker within the emerging state used this freedom from previous repression to court the Skoptsy and other minority sects. Posing these groups as proto-Communists victimized by the Tsarist government, Bonch-Bruevich also gained favor for the sects among the Soviet government. The Skoptsy were broadly receptive to these appeals. The Skoptsy writer Gavriil Men'shenin celebrated the revolution as a "new dawn of life", and Kuzma Lisin's followers claimed that the revolution was predicted by Christ, who said that they should welcome it.

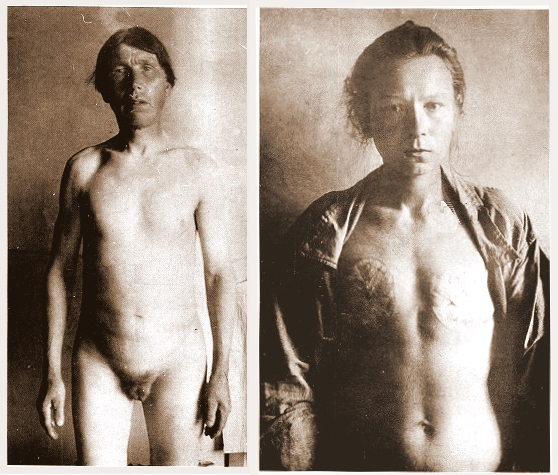
Photos of Skoptsy taken by ethnographer Nikolai Volkov to be used against them in the 1929 trials.

The treatment of the Skoptsy in the Soviet Union worsened as time progressed. While the Skoptsy's wealth could be seen as aspirational during the free market years of the New Economic Policy, the political landscape strongly shifted as Joseph Stalin replaced the economically liberal NEP with pro-collectivization policies that opposed the accumulation of wealth. In the context of this change, the Skoptsy began to be seen as exploiters of labor. Bonch-Bruevich, once a staunch supporter of the Skoptsy, began to adopt the anti-religious party line. Writing to prominent Skoptsy who complained of the repression, he stated that the Skoptsy arrested must have been fanatics or harming people's welfare. He also began to oppose the practice of castration, especially of children. In 1927 a propaganda play was put on in Moscow denigrating the Skoptsy, and the Soviet secret police arrested a Leningrad Skoptsy community of 158 people. Two other groups of Skoptsy in Saratov and Moscow would also be arrested, and the three communities were put on trial from 1929 to 1931. Prosecutors and the party portrayed the Skoptsy as exploitative NEPmen perpetuating the old religious order. The ruling of the 1929 trial of the Leningrad Skoptsy stated that the sect was a formal, organized conspiracy with anti-Soviet aims, and the Skoptsy were convicted of both inflicting physical injury and counter-revolutionary activities.

The Skoptsy population rapidly declined during Soviet collectivization, numbering only about 2,000 people by 1929. The remaining Skoptsy were driven into seclusion, with little record of their activities after the trials. Unsubstantiated reports from the 1970s placed several dozen Skoptsy in Tambov Oblast, and several hundred in Oryol Oblast. These surviving groups no longer self-castrated, and maintained their population by adopting orphans of the Second World War.

== See also ==
- Old Believers – religious communities that also split from the Russian Orthodox Church
- Genital nullification – modern surgical procedures to remove genitalia
- Shakers – Protestant sect that adheres to celibacy

== Bibliography ==
- Buss, Andreas (2010). The Russian-Orthodox Tradition and Modernity. Leiden: Brill. ISBN 978-90-04-13324-2.
- Engelstein, Laura (1997). "From Heresy to Harm: Self-castrators in the Civic Discourse of Late Tsarist Russia" (PDF). In Hara, Teruyuki; Matsuzato, Kimitaka (eds.). Empire and Society: New Approaches to Russian History. Hokkaido University: Slavic Research Center. pp. 1–22. ISBN 978-4-938637-11-8. Archived (PDF) from the original on 2011-09-27.
- ——— (1999). Castration and the Heavenly Kingdom. Ithaca: Cornell University Press. ISBN 0-8014-3676-1.
- ——— (2000). "Personal Testimony and the Defense of Faith: Skoptsy Telling Tales". In Engelstein, Laura; Sandler, Stephanie (eds.). Self and Story in Russian History. Ithica and London: Cornell University Press. ISBN 0-8014-3791-1.
- Etkind, Alexander (1998). Хлыст: Секты, литература и революция [Khlysty: Sects, Literature, and Revolution] (in Russian). Moscow: University of Helsinki. ISBN 978-5-86793-030-1.
- Frick, Karl R. H. (2005). Licht und Finsternis [Light and Darkness] (in German). Vol. 2. Wiesbaden: Marix Verlag. ISBN 3-86539-044-7.
- Gentes, Andrew Armand (2010). Exile, Murder and Madness in Siberia, 1823-61. Basingstoke: Palgrave Macmillan. ISBN 978-0-230-27326-9.
- Grass, Karl Konrad (1904). Die geheime heilige Schrift der Skopzen [The Secret Holy Scripture of the Skoptsy] (in German). Leipzig: J. C. Hinrichs'sche Buchhandlung.
- ——— (1907). Die russischen Sekten [The Russian Sects] (in German). Leipzig: J. C. Hinrichs'sche Buchhandlung.
- Lane, Christel (1978). Christian Religion in the Soviet Union: a Sociological Study. Albany: SUNY Press. ISBN 0-87395-327-4.
- Maltsev, Vladimir (2022). "Economic Effects of Voluntary Religious Castration on the Informal Provision of Cooperation: The Case of the Russian Skoptsy Sect". European Economic Review. 145 104109. doi:10.1016/j.euroecorev.2022.104109. ISSN 0014-2921.
- Panchenko, Alexander (2002). Христовщина и скопчество: Фольклор и традиционная культура русских мистических сект [Khlysts and Skoptsy: Folklore and Traditional Culture of the Russian Mystical Sects] (in Russian). Moscow: United Humanitarian Publishing House. ISBN 978-5-94282-106-7.
- Pelikan, Evgenij Venceslavovic̆ (1876). Geschichtlich-medizinische Untersuchungen über das Skopzentum in Rußland [Forensic Medical Investigations into the Skoptsy of Russia] (in German). Translated by Iwanoff, Nicolaus. Munich: J. Ricker'sche Buchhandlung.
- Perrie, Maureen (2023). "The Castrates, the Specter of Pugachev, and Religious Policy under Nicholas I". Kritika: Explorations in Russian and Eurasian History. 24 (2): 299–320. doi:10.1353/kri.2023.0017. ISSN 1538-5000.
