= Pushkov =

Pushkov (Russian: Пушков) is a Russian masculine surname, its feminine counterpart is Pushkova. It may refer to

- Aleksey Pushkov (born 1954), Russian statesman and politician
- Ganna Pushkova-Areshka (born 1978), Belarusian sprint canoer
- Nikolay Pushkov (1903-1981), Soviet scientist
- Sergei Pushkov (born 1964), Russian ice hockey player
