= Karachevsky =

Karachevsky (masculine), Karachevskaya (feminine), or Karachevskoye (neuter) may refer to:

== Places ==
- Karachevsky District, a district of Bryansk Oblast
- Karachevsky Uyezd (17th century–1929), an administrative division in the Russian Empire and the early Russian SFSR; its territory now a part of Bryansk Oblast
- Karachevsky Urban Administrative Okrug, an administrative division which the town of Karachev and thirty-one rural localities in Karachevsky District of Bryansk Oblast, Russia are incorporated as
- Karachevskoye Urban Settlement, a municipal formation which Karachevsky Urban Administrative Okrug in Karachevsky District of Bryansk Oblast, Russia is incorporated as

== People ==
- Karachevsky (family), a princely family of Rurikid stock
- German Karachevsky, cross-country skier participating in the 1992 Olympics as a member of the Unified Team
