= Nikolay Pushkov =

- Born: Nikolay Vasilyevich Pushkov; 17 May 1903; Druzhno village, Dmitrovsky Uyezd, Oryol Governorate, Russian Empire
- Died: 28 January 1981 (aged 77); Troitsk, Russian SFSR, Soviet Union

Nikolay Vasilyevich Pushkov (Russian: Никола́й Васи́льевич Пушко́в; 17 May 1903 – 28 January 1981) was a Soviet geophysicist and founder of IZMIRAN.

He defended candidate's (Ph.D.) dissertation "Theory of Space Magnetism" in 1935 in Leningrad.

== Scientific works ==
1. Theory of Space Magnetism (Thesis), 1934, 1935
2. Upper layers of Earth Atmosphere and Earth Magnetism, published in Proc. of the Stratospheric Conference, 1935
3. Newest Theories in Earth Magnetism, published in Meteorogical Bulletin, 1935
4. Message on some works about Earth Magnetism and electricity in USSR for the 1931-1935 period, published in the Informational Digest over Earth Magnetism, 1936
5. Statistical study of unexpected onset of magnetic storms, published in the Inf. Dig. over Earth Magn., 1936
6. Comparison of magnetic activity with polar lights activity in Tihaya Bay , published in the Inf. Dig. over Earth Magn., 1937
7. Radioforecasts User Manual (Руководство к пользованию радиопрогнозами), separate book, 1947
8. Polar lights, published in the Issues of Academy of Sciences of USSR, 1958
9. Observations of polar lights (instruction), published in the Issues of Academy of Sciences of USSR, 1957
10. Studying Earth magnetic field on rockets and satellites, Uspekhi Fizicheskikh Nauk, 1957
11. Preliminary report on geomagnetic studying on a Soviet artificial satellite, published in the Artificial Earth Satellites Digest ed. 2, 1958
12. Results of Earth magnetic field studying on a space rockets, published in the Reports of Academy of Sciences of USSR, 1959
13. Magnetic field studying on a second space rocket, published in the Artificial Earth Satellites Digest, 1960
14. Magnetic field of the outer corpuscular region, published in the Proc. of the International conference on cosmic rays, 1960
15. Assembly on International Quiet Sun Year, published in the Bulletin of Academy of Sciences of USSR, 1963
16. Studying of the magnetic field in space, published in Space Research, 1963
17. When the Sun is Quiet?, published in Aviation and Cosmonautics, 1965
18. Attention! Sun is Quiet, published in Hydrometeoizdat, 1966 and by Mir Publishing House, 1968
19. Main results of upper layers studying in Antarctic, published in the Main results of 10-year study of Antarctic, 1967.
20. Resume of International Quiet Sun Year (London Assembly), published in the Bulletin of Academy of Sciences of USSR, 1967
21. Sun influence on the Earth scene, published in the Bulletin of Academy of Sciences of USSR, 1968
22. Studying of the magnetic fields of Earth and planets, published in the Progress of the USSR in the space explorations, 1968
23. Leningrad symposium on Sun-Earth physics, published in the Earth and Universe, 1971
24. Sun-Earth connections, published in the Geophysics Digest, 1971
- Source: Typewriter IZMIRAN library cards on Pushkov's works (in Russian)
