= Bolkhovsky Uyezd =

Bolkhovsky Uyezd (Бо́лховский уе́зд) was one of the subdivisions of the Oryol Governorate of the Russian Empire. It was situated in the northern part of the governorate. Its administrative centre was Bolkhov.

== Demographics ==
At the time of the Russian Empire Census of 1897, Bolkhovsky Uyezd had a population of 137,649. Of these, 99.9% spoke Russian as their native language.
