= Kromskoy Uyezd =

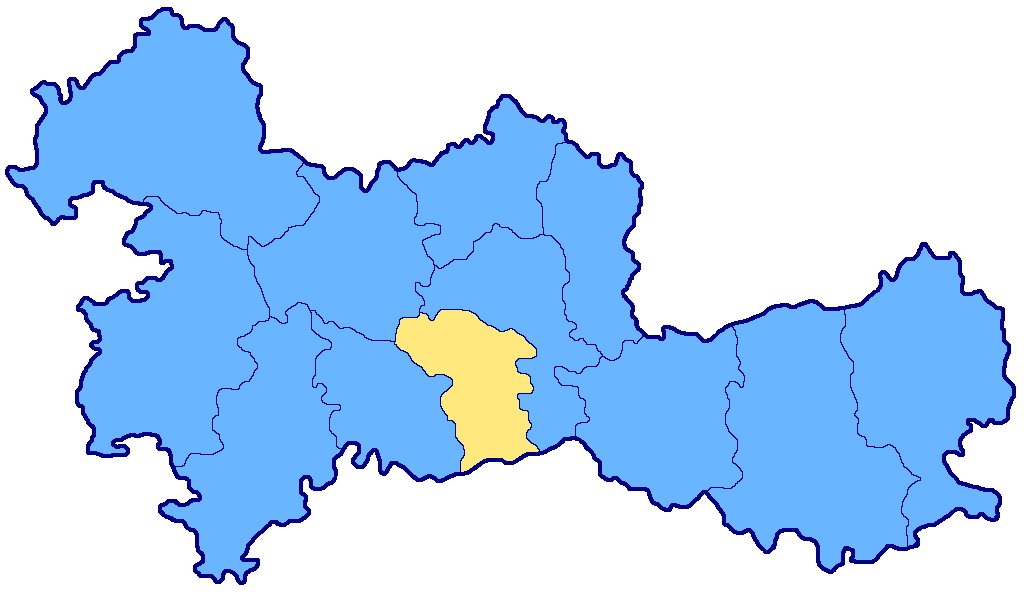

Kromskoy Uyezd (Кромской уезд) was one of the subdivisions of the Oryol Governorate of the Russian Empire. It was situated in the southern part of the governorate. Its administrative centre was Kromy.

== Demographics ==
At the time of the Russian Empire Census of 1897, Kromskoy Uyezd had a population of 110,029. Of these, 99.8% spoke Russian and 0.1% Yiddish as their native language.
