= Altukhovo, Bryansk Oblast =

Urban locality in Navlinsky District of Bryansk Oblast, Russia

Altukhovo Алтухово
- Work settlement
- Interactive map of Altukhovo
- Location of Altukhovo Altukhovo (Bryansk Oblast)
- Coordinates: 52°40′42″N 34°21′56″E
- Country: Russia
- Federal subject: Bryansk Oblast
- Administrative district: Navlinsky District
- Elevation: 172 m (564 ft)

Population (2010 Census)
  - Total: 1,784
  - Estimate (2025): 1,649 (−7.6%)

Municipal status
  - Municipal district: Navlinsky Municipal District
  - Urban settlement: Altukhovskoye Urban Settlement
  - Capital of: Altukhovskoye Urban Settlement
- Time zone: UTC+3 (MSK)
- Postal code: 242150
- OKTMO ID: 15638162051

Altukhovo (Russian: Алтухо́во) is an urban locality (urban-type settlement) in Navlinsky District of Bryansk Oblast, Russia. Population: 1,679 (2021 census); 1,784 (2010 census); 1,947 (2002 census); 2,222 (1989 Soviet census).
