= Maloarkhangelsky Uyezd =

Maloarkhangelsky Uyezd (Малоарха́нгельский уезд) was one of the subdivisions of the Oryol Governorate of the Russian Empire. It was situated in the southeastern part of the governorate. Its administrative centre was Maloarkhangelsk.

== Demographics ==
At the time of the Russian Empire Census of 1897, Maloarkhangelsky Uyezd had a population of 175,158. Of these, 99.9% spoke Russian as their native language.
