= IZMIRAN =

Soviet-Russian research institute

Pushkov Institute of Terrestrial Magnetism, Ionosphere and Radiowave Propagation
- Abbreviation: IZMIRAN
- Formation: October 11, 1939
- Type: Institute of RAS
- Headquarters: Troitsk, Moscow, Russia
- Official language: Russian
- Directors: Artem Anatolievich Abunin (since 2024)
- Main organ: RAS
- Staff: 600 including 300 employees
- Website: www.izmiran.ru

The Pushkov Institute of Terrestrial Magnetism, Ionosphere and Radiowave Propagation of the Russian Academy of Sciences (IZMIRAN, Russian: Институт земного магнетизма, ионосферы и распространения радиоволн им. Н. В. Пушкова Российской Академии наук, ИЗМИРАН) is a scientific institution of the Russian Academy of Sciences. This institute was founded in 1939 by Nikolay Pushkov.

Institute owns several space satellites programs:

- CORONAS - Complex ORbital Near Earth Solar Activities (experiment ended)
- COMPASS (Kompas) - Complex Orbital Magneto-Plasma Autonomous Small Satellite (see 2001 in spaceflight)
- Interheliozond
- Intercosmos-19 (Cosmos-1809) - research of the Earth ionospheric structure and of the electromagnetic processes in it (experiment ended)
- Prognoz - a series of magnetometer satellites
- APEX - Active Plasma Experiments
