= Trubchevsky Uyezd =

Trubchevsky Uyezd (Трубче́вский уе́зд) was one of the subdivisions of the Oryol Governorate of the Russian Empire. It was situated in the western part of the governorate. Its administrative centre was Trubchevsk.

== Demographics ==
At the time of the Russian Empire Census of 1897, Trubchevsky Uyezd had a population of 130,455. Of these, 99.4% spoke Russian, 0.3% Yiddish and 0.2% Ukrainian as their native language.
