= Mtsensky Uyezd =

Area during the Russian Empire

Mtsensky Uyezd (Мце́нский уе́зд) was one of the subdivisions of the Oryol Governorate of the Russian Empire. It was situated in the central part of the governorate. Its administrative centre was Mtsensk.

== Demographics ==
At the time of the Russian Empire Census of 1897, Mtsensky Uyezd had a population of 104,200. Of these, 99.9% spoke Russian as their native language.
