= Laura Engelstein =

American historian

Laura Engelstein FBA
- Occupation: Historian
- Known for: Contributions to the field of Russian studies

Academic background
- Education: Stanford University
- Thesis: (1976)
- Doctoral advisor: Terence Emmons

Academic work
- Discipline: History
- Sub-discipline: Russian history

Laura Engelstein FBA is an American historian who specializes in Russian and European history. She serves as Henry S. McNeil Professor Emerita of Russian History at Yale University and taught at Cornell University and Princeton University.

== Education ==
Engelstein studied in Moscow from 1973 to 1974, completing a stazhirovka, or internship. She earned her Ph.D. from Stanford University in 1976 under Terence Emmons.

== Teaching career and publications ==
Following graduation, she accepted a position at Cornell University, the second woman to be hired by the school's history department. While teaching at Cornell, Engelstein completed her first book, which "analyzed patterns of working-class behavior in the course of the revolution of 1905 in Moscow." Moscow, 1905: Working-Class Organization and Political Conflict was published in 1982.

Engelstein became a professor at Princeton University in 1985. The same year, she began completing the research for her second book, The Keys to Happiness: Sex and the Search for Modernity in Fin-de-Siecle Russia, which was published in 1992.

On November 3, 2001, Engelstein accepted an offer to join the history faculty at Yale, where she served as Henry S. McNeil Professor Emerita of Russian History. Shortly before fall 2014, Engelstein retired from her work as a professor at Yale University.

Her numerous publications have included Moscow, 1905: Working-Class Organization and Political Conflict (1982); The Keys to Happiness: Sex and the Search for Modernity in Fin-de-Siecle Russia (1992). Castration and the Heavenly Kingdom: A Russian Folktale (1999) examined the Skoptsy, a Christian sect which practiced castration to combat sexual urges. Other works include Slavophile Empire: Imperial Russia’s Illiberal Path (2009); and Russia in Flames: War, Revolution, Civil War, 1914–1921 (2017). In 2000, she co-edited an essay collection with Stephanie Sandler, Self and Story in Russian History. A translation with Grazyna Drabik of Andrzej Bobkowski's Wartime Notebooks: France, 1940–1944, was released in November 2018. Her research interests lie in the "social and cultural history of late imperial Russia, with attention to the role of law, medicine, and the arts in public life," as well as "themes in the history of gender, sexuality, and religion."

== Honors and awards ==
Engelstein's second book won the Wayne S. Vucinich Prize and shared the Heldt Prize.

Engelstein has received awards from the Guggenheim Foundation, the Woodrow Wilson International Center for Scholars, the National Humanities Center, and the Center for Scholars and Writers at the New York Public Library.

In 2010, she was named a Metro Berlin Prize Fellow by the American Academy in Berlin.

Kritika: Explorations in Russian and Eurasian History described Engelstein as one of "the most important figures in the field of Russian history" with an "incisive mind" and "analytical acuity," adding that she had "played a crucial role in enhancing our understanding of the complex interplay of social, cultural, intellectual, and political forces in the late imperial period."
