= Dmitrovsky Uyezd (Oryol Governorate) =

Dmitrovsky Uyezd (Russian: Дмитро́вский уе́зд) was one of the subdivisions of the Oryol Governorate of the Russian Empire. It was situated in the southern part of the governorate. Its administrative centre was Dmitrovsk.

== Demographics ==
At the time of the Russian Empire Census of 1897, Dmitrovsky Uyezd had a population of 105,168. Of these, 99.8% spoke Russian and 0.1% Yiddish as their native language.
