= Karachevsky Uyezd =

Karachevsky Uyezd (Кара́чевский уезд) was one of the subdivisions of the Oryol Governorate of the Russian Empire. It was situated in the western part of the governorate. Its administrative centre was Karachev.

== Demographics ==
At the time of the Russian Empire Census of 1897, Karachevsky Uyezd had a population of 135,937. Of these, 99.2% spoke Russian, 0.2% Yiddish, 0.2% Polish, 0.1% Ukrainian, 0.1% Belarusian and 0.1% German as their native language.
