= Orlovsky Uyezd (Oryol Governorate) =

Orlovsky Uyezd (Орло́вский уе́зд) was one of the subdivisions of the Oryol Governorate of the Russian Empire. It was situated in the central part of the governorate. Its administrative centre was Oryol.

== Demographics ==
At the time of the Russian Empire Census of 1897, Orlovsky Uyezd had a population of 208,620. Of these, 97.9% spoke Russian, 0.8% Yiddish, 0.7% Polish, 0.3% German, 0.1% Belarusian and 0.1% Ukrainian as their native language.
