= Sevsky Uyezd =

Sevsky Uyezd (Се́вский уе́зд) was one of the subdivisions of the Oryol Governorate of the Russian Empire. It was situated in the southwestern part of the governorate. Its administrative centre was Sevsk.

== Demographics ==
At the time of the Russian Empire Census of 1897, Sevsky Uyezd had a population of 152,145. Of these, 98.7% spoke Russian, 0.6% Belarusian, 0.4% Ukrainian and 0.2% Yiddish as their native language.
