= Alexandr Shilov =

Russian painter

- Александр Шилов
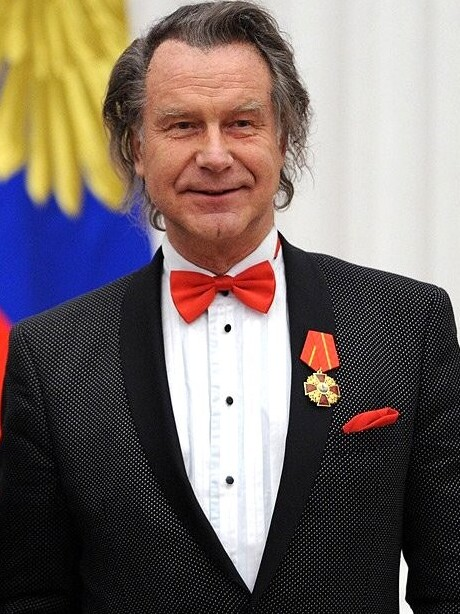
- Shilov in 2013
- Born: 6 October 1943 (age 82); Moscow, Russia
- Education: Surikov Moscow Art Institute
- Occupation: Portrait painter

Alexander Maxovich Shilov (Russian: Александр Максович Шилов; born 6 October 1943) is a prominent Soviet and Russian portrait painter.

== Biography ==
Shilov was born in Moscow.

Between 1968 and 1973, he studied at the Surikov Moscow Art Institute. In 1976 he became a member of the Union of Artists of the USSR. In 1985 he became People's Artist of the USSR. In 1992 one of the asteroids (4164 Shilov discovered by Lyudmila Ivanovna Chernykh) was named after him. In 1996 he donated to the Russian Government 365 portraits painted by him. Since 2001 he is a full member of Russian Academy of Arts

In March 2014 he signed a letter in support of the position of the President of Russia, Vladimir Putin on Russia's military intervention in Ukraine.

== Works ==
The speciality of Alexander Shilov are ceremonial portraits, often painted from photographs without even seeing his subjects. He painted more than 600 of them. Hailed in his youth as the great champion of Socialist Realism and patronized by Kremlin rulers, he painted portraits of all the leaders of the Soviet Union and Russia including Leonid Brezhnev, Yuri Andropov, Konstantin Chernenko, Mikhail Gorbachev, Boris Yeltsin, Vladimir Putin, most of Cosmonauts, etc. He also produced portraits of his daughter Mashenka, his mother and grandmother.

Shilov's opponents insisted that his portraits are little more than the flattering photographs transferred onto canvas, but his proponents claim a unique realistic style directly inherited from Dmitry Levitzky and Orest Kiprensky. In 1997 one of the leading proponents, the Moscow mayor Yuriy Luzhkov, opened the Moscow State Art Gallery of People's Artist of the USSR Alexander Shilov, just several steps away from the Moscow Kremlin. The gallery is devoted solely to exhibitions of Shilov's work.

== Awards ==
=== State Awards of the Russian Federation ===
- Hero of Labor of the Russian Federation (2023) — for special services to the development of Russian culture and art, and for many years of fruitful work.
- Honored Artist of the RSFSR (1980)
- People's Artist of the RSFSR (1981)
- People's Artist of the USSR (1985)
- Lenin Komsomol Prize (1977) — for a series of portraits of Soviet cosmonauts
- Order "For Merit to the Fatherland", 3rd Class (2004) — for significant contribution to the development of Russian artistic culture.
- Order "For Merit to the Fatherland", 4th Class (1997) — for services to the state and for significant personal contribution to the development of the fine arts
- Order of Alexander Nevsky (2013) — for significant contribution to the development of Russian culture and art, television, and long-term creative work
- Order of Honour (2010) - for services to the development of Russian culture and art, and many years of fruitful work
- Medal "In Commemoration of the 850th Anniversary of Moscow" (1997)

=== Foreign Awards ===
- Order of Francisk Skaryna (2003, Belarus) - for significant personal contribution to strengthening friendship and cooperation between the peoples of Belarus and Russia, and the development of Belarusian-Russian cultural ties[16]
- Order of Honor (Belarus)
