= Navlinsky District =

Navlinsky District Навлинский район (Russian)
- District
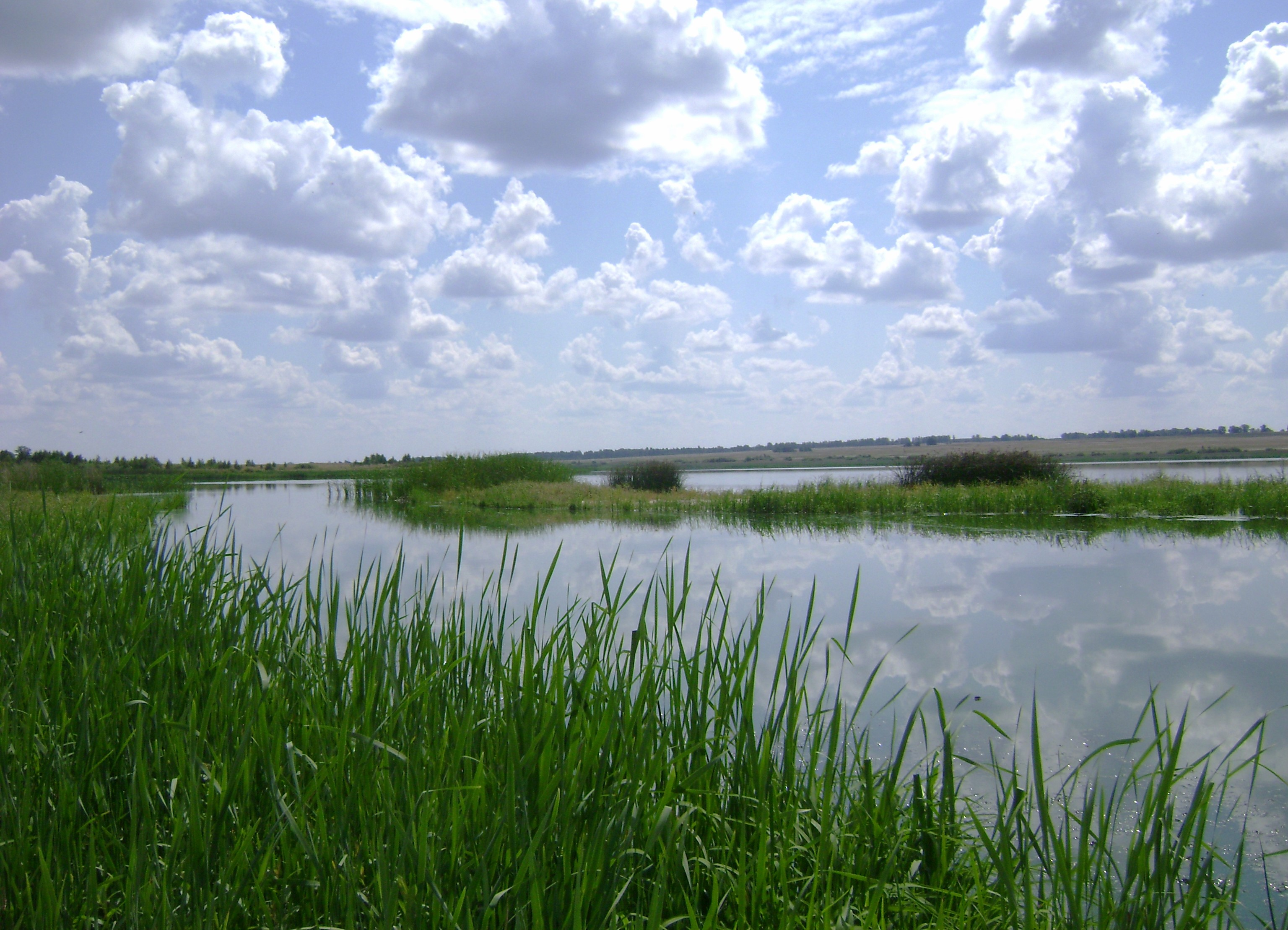
- Summer day in Navlinsky

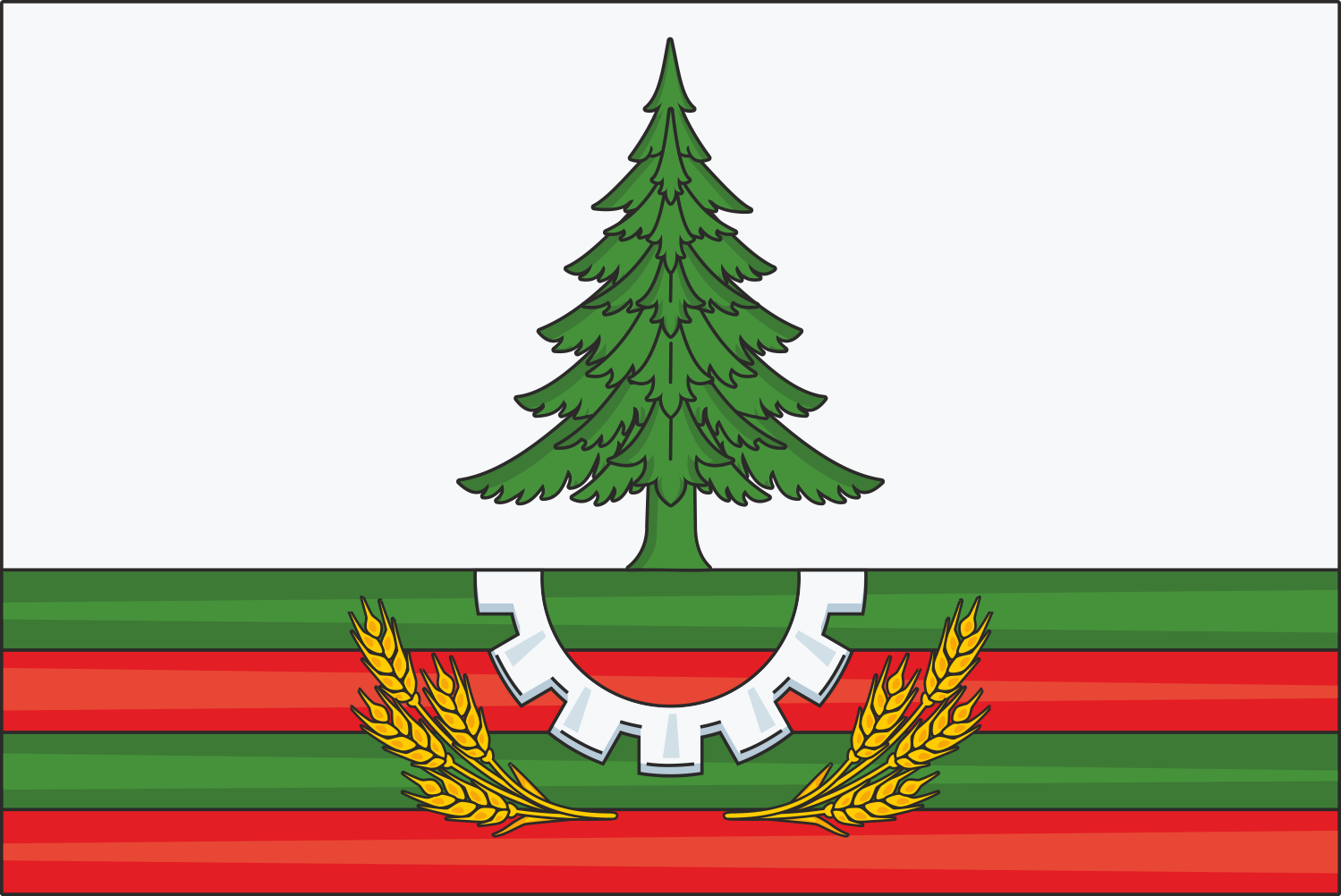
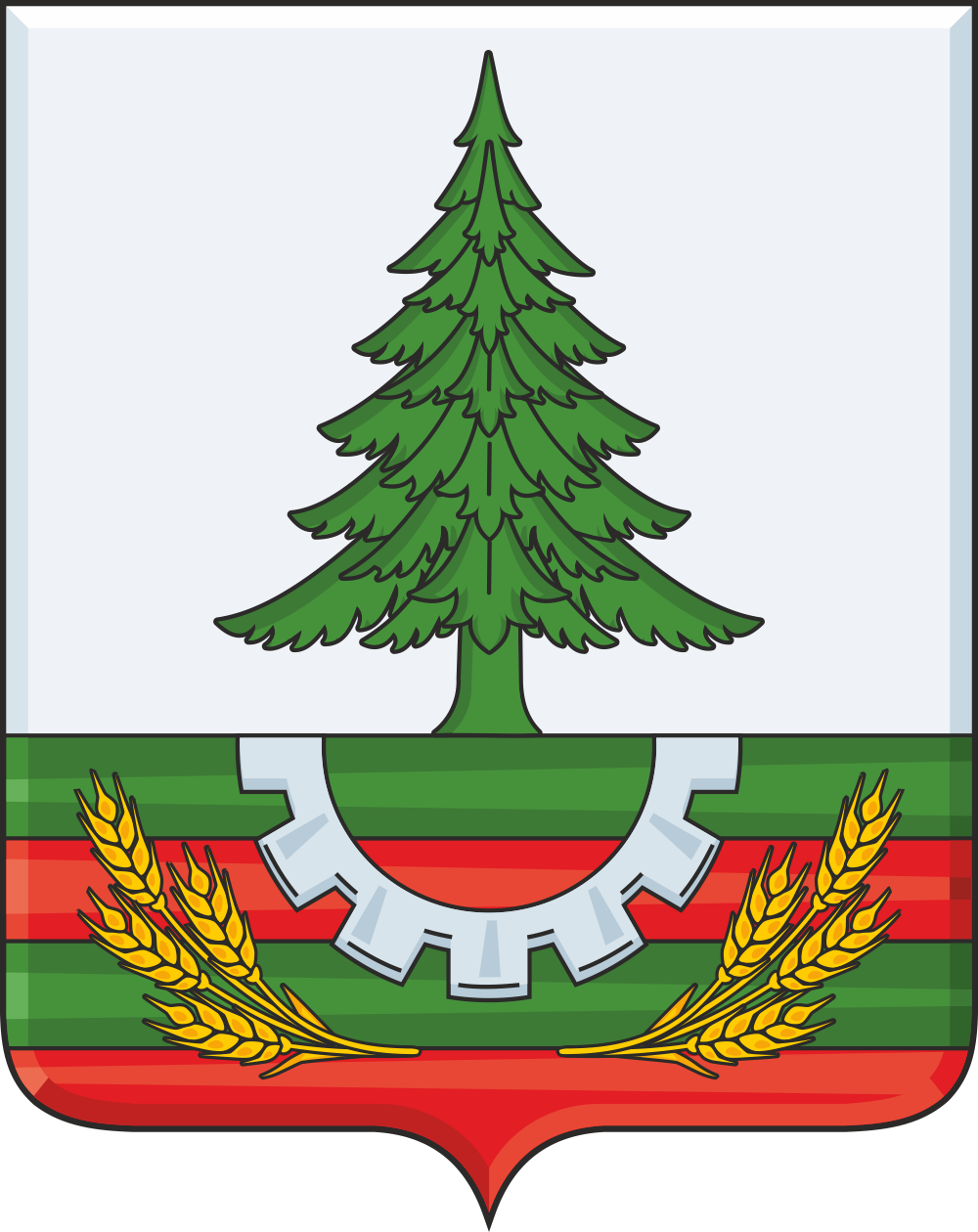
- Flag Coat of arms
- Location of Navlinsky District in Bryansk Oblast
- Coordinates: 52°49′41″N 34°29′56″E
- Country: Russia
- Federal subject: Bryansk Oblast
- Administrative center: Navlya

Area
  - Total: 2,012 km^{2} (777 sq mi)

Population (2010 Census)
  - Total: 28,341
  - Density: 14.09/km^{2} (36.48/sq mi)
  - Urban: 57.0%
  - Rural: 43.0%

Administrative structure
  - Administrative divisions: 2 Settlement administrative okrugs, 11 Rural administrative okrugs
  - Inhabited localities: 2 urban-type settlements, 83 rural localities

Municipal structure
  - Municipally incorporated as: Navlinsky Municipal District
  - Municipal divisions: 2 urban settlements, 11 rural settlements
- Time zone: UTC+3 (MSK)
- OKTMO ID: 15638000
- Website: http://www.admnav.ru/

Navlinsky District (Russian: На́влинский райо́н) is an administrative and municipal district (raion), one of the twenty-seven in Bryansk Oblast, Russia. It is located in the east of the oblast. The area of the district is 2,012 square kilometers (777 sq mi). Its administrative center is the urban locality (a work settlement) of Navlya. Population:26,906 (2021 census); 28,341 (2010 census); 29,783 (2002 Census); 32,189 (1989 Soviet census). The population of Navlya accounts for 57.7% of the district's total population.
