= Alexander Ivanovich Shilov =

Russian sect founder

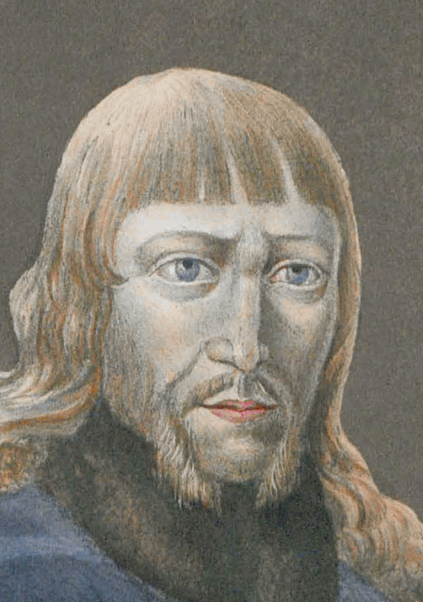
Portrait of Alexander Ivanovich Shilov

Alexander Ivanovich Shilov (Russian: Александр Иванович Шилов ?-6 January O.S. 1799) was one of the founders of the Skoptzy sect.

He was born to a family of peasants of Penza gubernia. He was married and even had children, but neither family life nor the official religion satisfied him. He found the founder of the Skoptzy sect Kondraty Selivanov, who initiated him as a Khlyst, and became an active proponent and preacher of the new sect.

For castrating 9 peasants Shilov was exiled to Riga but continued preaching of his heresy. In 1789 for castrating 12 soldiers in Riga, Shilov was beaten by batons and imprisoned to the Dunamond fortress, in 1797 he was transferred to the Shlisselburg Fortress but still advocated castrating to the prison guards as well as stated that Peter III of Russia is alive and is the true tsar of Russia. At the night from 5 to 6 January O.S. 1799 (by other sources from 5 to 6 January O.S. 1800 he was executed. The chapel on his grave soon became a popular place for castrating by Skoptzy, so in 1829 it had to be destroyed.
