= Oryol Governorate =

1796–1928 unit of Russia

Coordinates: 52.9667°N 36.0833°E

Oryol Governorate Орловская губерния
- Governorate of the Russian Empire (1778/1796–1917), Russian Republic, and RSFSR (1917–1928)
- 1778/1796–1928
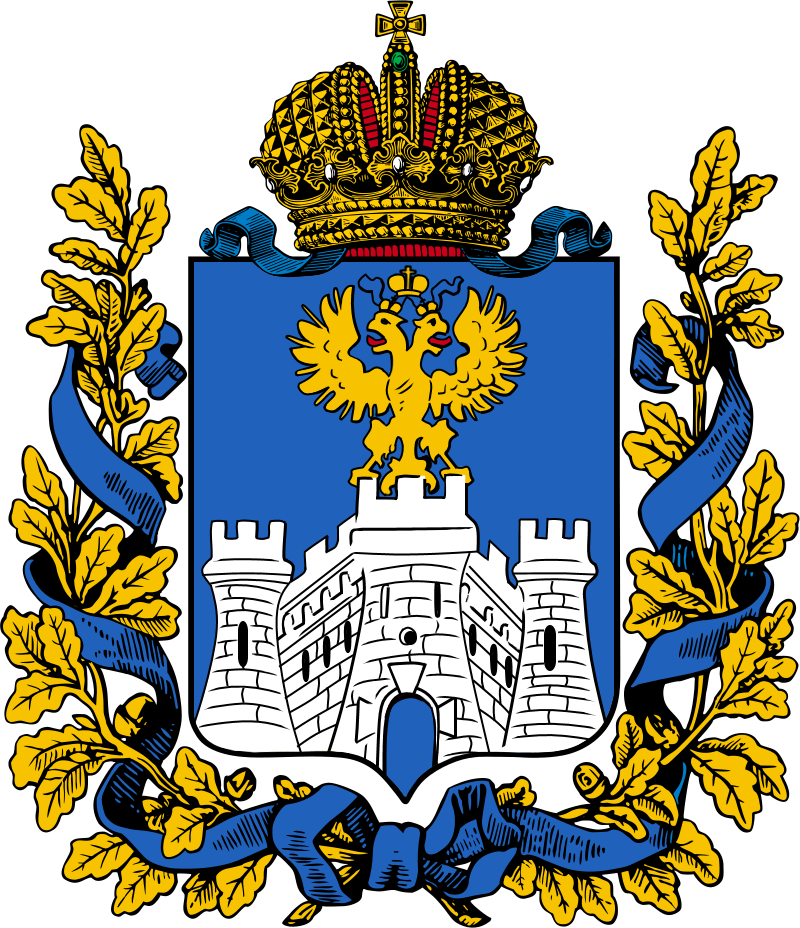
- Coat of arms

- Location in the Russian Empire
- Capital: Oryol
- Area
- 46,726.2 km^{2} (18,041.1 sq mi)
- Population
  - 1897: 2,033,798
- History
  - Established: 1778/1796
  - Disestablished: 1928
Preceded by	Succeeded by
Oryol Viceroyalty	Central Black Earth Oblast

Oryol Governorate (Russian: Орловская губерния, romanized: Orlovskaya guberniya) was an administrative-territorial unit (guberniya) of the Russian Empire and the Russian SFSR, which existed from 1796 to 1928. Its seat was in the city of Oryol.

== Administrative division ==
Oryol Governorate consisted of the following uyezds (administrative centres in parentheses):

- Bolkhovsky Uyezd (Bolkhov)
- Bryansky Uyezd (Bryansk)
- Dmitrovsky Uyezd (Dmitrovsk)
- Yeletsky Uyezd (Yelets)
- Karachevsky Uyezd (Karachev)
- Kromskoy Uyezd (Kromy)
- Livensky Uyezd (Livny)
- Maloarkhangelsky Uyezd (Maloarkhangelsk)
- Mtsensky Uyezd (Mtsensk)
- Orlovsky Uyezd (Oryol)
- Sevsky Uyezd (Sevsk)
- Trubchevsky Uyezd (Trubchevsk)
