= Apostolic Church of Christ (Pentecostal) =

Christian denomination

- Classification: Protestant
- Orientation: Pentecostal
- Origin: 1969; Winston-Salem, North Carolina
- Separated from: Church of God (Apostolic)

Apostolic Church of Christ (Pentecostal) is a Pentecostal Christian denomination founded in North Carolina in 1969 by Johnnie Draft and Wallace Snow. Both these men had been members of the Church of God (Apostolic) prior to establishing this church. The only difference between the Apostolic Church of Christ (Pentecostal) and that from which it was founded is its organization, a centralized church polity. Authority is vested in the executive board, which owns all the church property. This was a departure from the organization the Church of God (Apostolic) had, where an Overseer and an "International General Assembly" governs the church and its property. The Apostolic Church of Christ (Pentecostal) left the Church of God (Apostolic) under Overseer Charles W. Conn.

== See also ==
- Apostolic Assemblies of Christ
- Apostolic Assembly of the Faith in Christ Jesus
- Apostolic Brethren
- Apostolic Church (denomination)
- Apostolic Faith Church
- Apostolic Gospel Church of Jesus Christ
- Apostolic Pentecostalism
- Free Apostolic Church of Pentecost
- International Apostolic Fellowship
- List of Christian denominations#Irvingist
- List of Christian denominations § Oneness Pentecostalism
- Apostolic Overcoming Holy Church of God
