= Greeks =

Ethnic group and nation

Greeks Hellenes
Έλληνες

Total population
- c. 14–17 million

Regions with significant populations
- Greece: 9,903,268 (2011 census)
- United States: 1,279,000–3,000,000^{a} (2016 estimate)
- Cyprus: 659,115–721,000 (2011 census)
- Germany: 449,000^{b} (2021 estimate)
- Australia: 424,744 (2021 census)
- United Kingdom: 290,000–345,000 (2011 estimate)
- Canada: 271,405^{c} (2016 census)
- Italy: 110,000–200,000^{d} (2013 estimate)
- South Africa: 138,000 (2011 estimate)
- Egypt: 110,000
- Chile: 100,000
- Ukraine: 91,000 (2011 estimate)
- Russia: 85,640 (2010 census)
- Brazil: 50,000^{e}
- France: 35,000 (2013 estimate)
- Belgium: 35,000 (2011 estimate)
- Netherlands: 28,856 (2021)
- Sweden: 24,736 (2012 census)
- Argentina: 20,000–30,000 (2013 estimate)
- Albania: 23,485 (2023 census)
- Turkey: 4,000–49,143^{f}
- Czech Republic: 12,000
- Switzerland: 11,000 (2015 estimate)
- New Zealand: est. 2,478 to 10,000, possibly up to 50,000
- Romania: 10,000 (2013 estimate)
- Uzbekistan: 9,500 (2000 estimate)
- Kazakhstan: 8,846 (2011 estimate)
- Bulgaria: 1,356 (2011 census) up to 28,500 (estimate)
- Georgia: 5,544 (2014 census)
- Austria: 5,261
- Hungary: 4,454 (2016 census)

Languages
- Greek

Religion
- Mostly Greek Orthodox
- ^{a} Includes those of ancestral descent.^{b} Includes people with "cultural roots".^{c} Those whose stated ethnic origins included "Greek" among others. The number of those whose stated ethnic origin is solely "Greek" is 145,250. An additional 3,395 Cypriots of undeclared ethnicity live in Canada.^{d}Approx. 60,000 Griko people and 30,000 post WW2 migrants.^{e} "Including descendants".^{f} Including Greek Muslims.

Greeks or Hellenes (/ˈhɛliːnz/; Greek: Έλληνες, Éllines [ˈelines]) are an ethnic group indigenous to what is now Greece, Cyprus, Turkey, parts of Egypt and Syria, southern Italy, southern Albania, and to a lesser extent, other countries surrounding the Eastern Mediterranean and the Black Sea. They form a nation within Greece and Cyprus and a significant diaspora (omogenia) around the world.

Greek communities have been historically established on the shores of the Mediterranean Sea and the Black Sea, but the Greek people themselves have always been concentrated on the Aegean Sea and the Ionian Sea, where the Greek language has been spoken since the Bronze Age. Until the early 20th century, Greeks were distributed between the Greek peninsula, the western coast of Anatolia as well as Cappadocia, the Black Sea coast, Egypt, the Balkans, Cyprus, and Constantinople. Many of these regions coincided to a large extent with the borders of the Byzantine Empire of the late 11th century and the Eastern Mediterranean areas of ancient Greek colonization. The cultural centres of the Greeks have included Athens, Thessalonica, Alexandria, Smyrna, and Constantinople at various periods.

In more recent history, most ethnic Greeks have lived within the borders of the modern Greek state or in Cyprus, as the Greek genocide and subsequent Greek–Turkish population exchange nearly ended the three-millennia-old Greek presence across Asia Minor. Other longstanding Greek populations can be found from southern Italy to the Caucasus, southern Russia and Ukraine, and in the Greek diaspora communities in a number of other countries, especially in the Western world. Today, most religious Greeks are Christians officially registered with the Greek Orthodox Church. The Westernness of Greeks, often affirmed in Western culture, has long been debated among Greeks themselves.

The Greek people have greatly influenced and contributed to culture, visual arts, exploration, theatre, literature, philosophy, ethics, politics, architecture, music, mathematics, medicine, science, technology, commerce, cuisine, and sports. The Greek language, which constitutes an independent branch within the Indo-European language family, is the oldest recorded living language, and its vocabulary has been the basis of many languages (including English) and the international scientific nomenclature. As early as the 4th century BC, the Greek language spread to become the most widely spoken lingua franca in the Mediterranean world for over a millennium, earning effective co-official status in the Roman Empire and also being the language in which the New Testament of the Christian Bible was originally written.

== History ==
Proto-Greek area of settlement (2200/2100–1900 BC) suggested by Katona (2000), Sakelariou (2016, 1980, 1975) and Phylaktopoulos (1975)

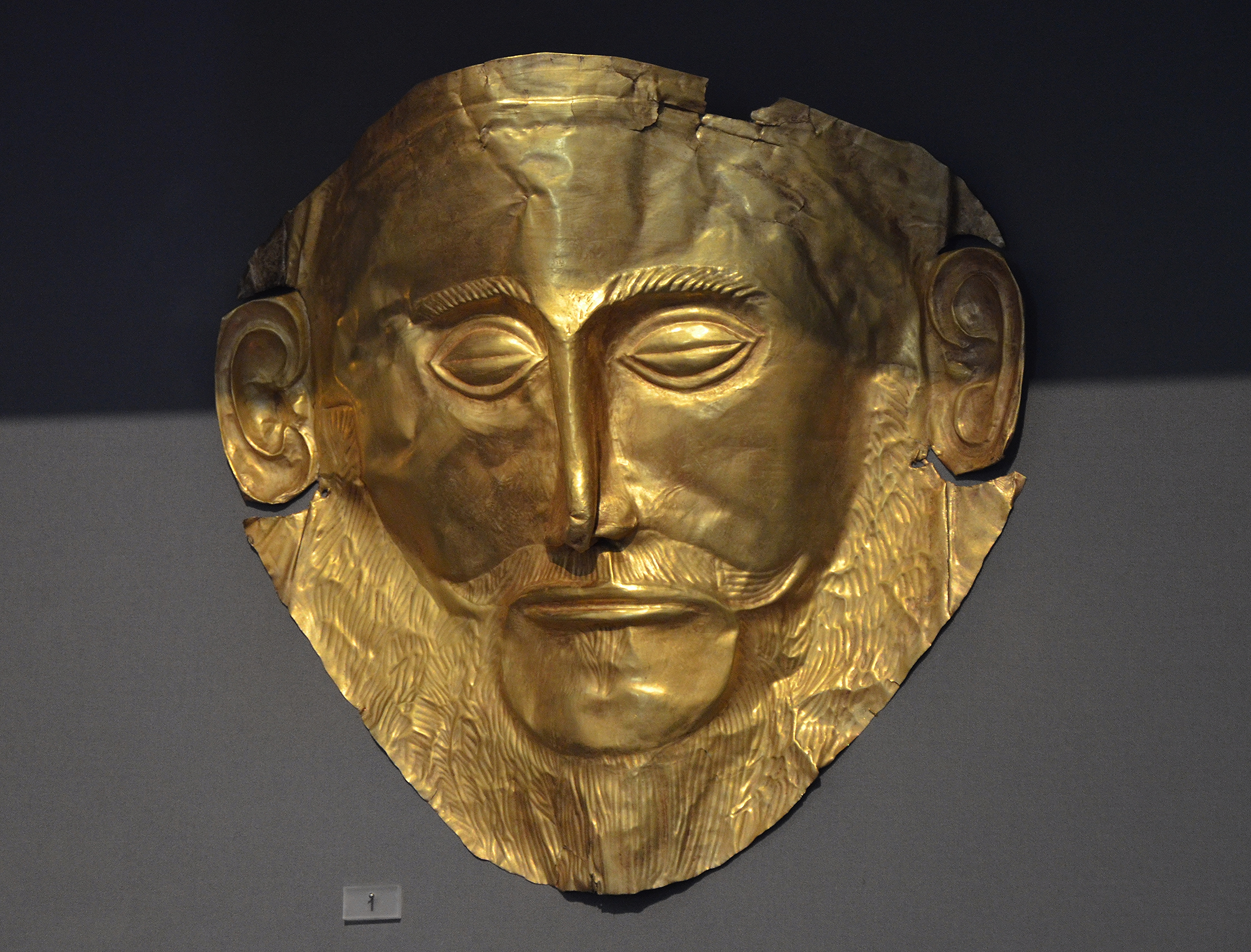
Mycenaean funeral mask known as "Mask of Agamemnon", 16th century BC

The Greeks speak the Greek language, which forms its own unique branch within the Indo-European family of languages, the Hellenic. They are part of a group of classical ethnicities. Anthony D. Smith described them as an "archetypal diaspora people".

=== Origins ===
The Proto-Greeks probably arrived in the area now called Greece, in the southern tip of the Balkan Peninsula, sometime during the European Bronze Age (c. 3rd millennium BC). The sequence of migrations into the Greek mainland has to be reconstructed on the basis of the ancient Greek dialects, as they presented themselves centuries later and are therefore subject to some uncertainties. There were at least two migrations, the first being the Ionians and Achaeans, which resulted in Mycenaean Greece by the 16th century BC, and the second, the Dorian invasion, around the 11th century BC, displacing the Arcadocypriot dialects, which descended from the Mycenaean period.

=== Mycenaean Greece ===
In c. 1600 BC, the Mycenaean Greeks borrowed from the Minoan civilization its syllabic writing system (Linear A) and developed their own syllabic script known as Linear B, providing the first and oldest written evidence of Greek. The Mycenaeans quickly penetrated the Aegean Sea and, by the 15th century BC, had reached Rhodes, Crete, Cyprus and the shores of Asia Minor.

Around 1200 BC, the Dorians, another Greek-speaking people, followed from Epirus. Older historical research often proposed Dorian invasion caused the collapse of the Mycenaean civilization, but this narrative has been abandoned in all contemporary research. It is likely that one of the factors which contributed to the Mycenaean palatial collapse was linked to raids by groups known in historiography as the "Sea Peoples" who sailed into the eastern Mediterranean around 1180 BC. The Dorian invasion was followed by a poorly attested period of migrations, appropriately called the Greek Dark Ages, but by 800 BC the landscape of Archaic and Classical Greece was discernible.

The Greeks of classical antiquity idealized their Mycenaean ancestors and the Mycenaean period as a glorious era of heroes, closeness of the gods and material wealth. The Homeric Epics (i.e. Iliad and Odyssey) were especially and generally accepted as part of the Greek past and it was not until the time of Euhemerism that scholars began to question Homer's historicity. As part of the Mycenaean heritage that survived, the names of the gods and goddesses of Mycenaean Greece (e.g. Zeus, Poseidon and Hades) became major figures of the Olympian Pantheon of later antiquity.

=== Ancient Greeks ===
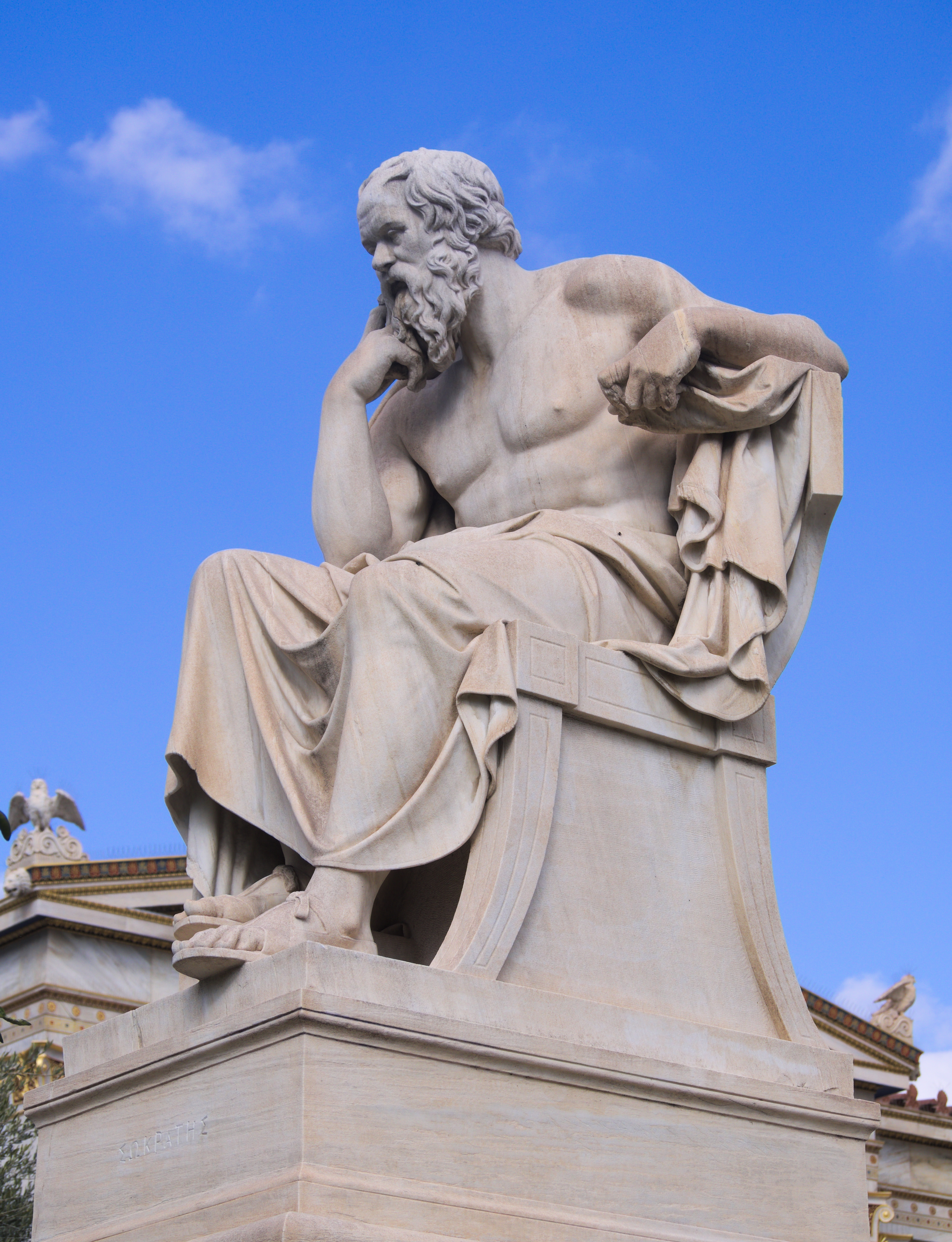
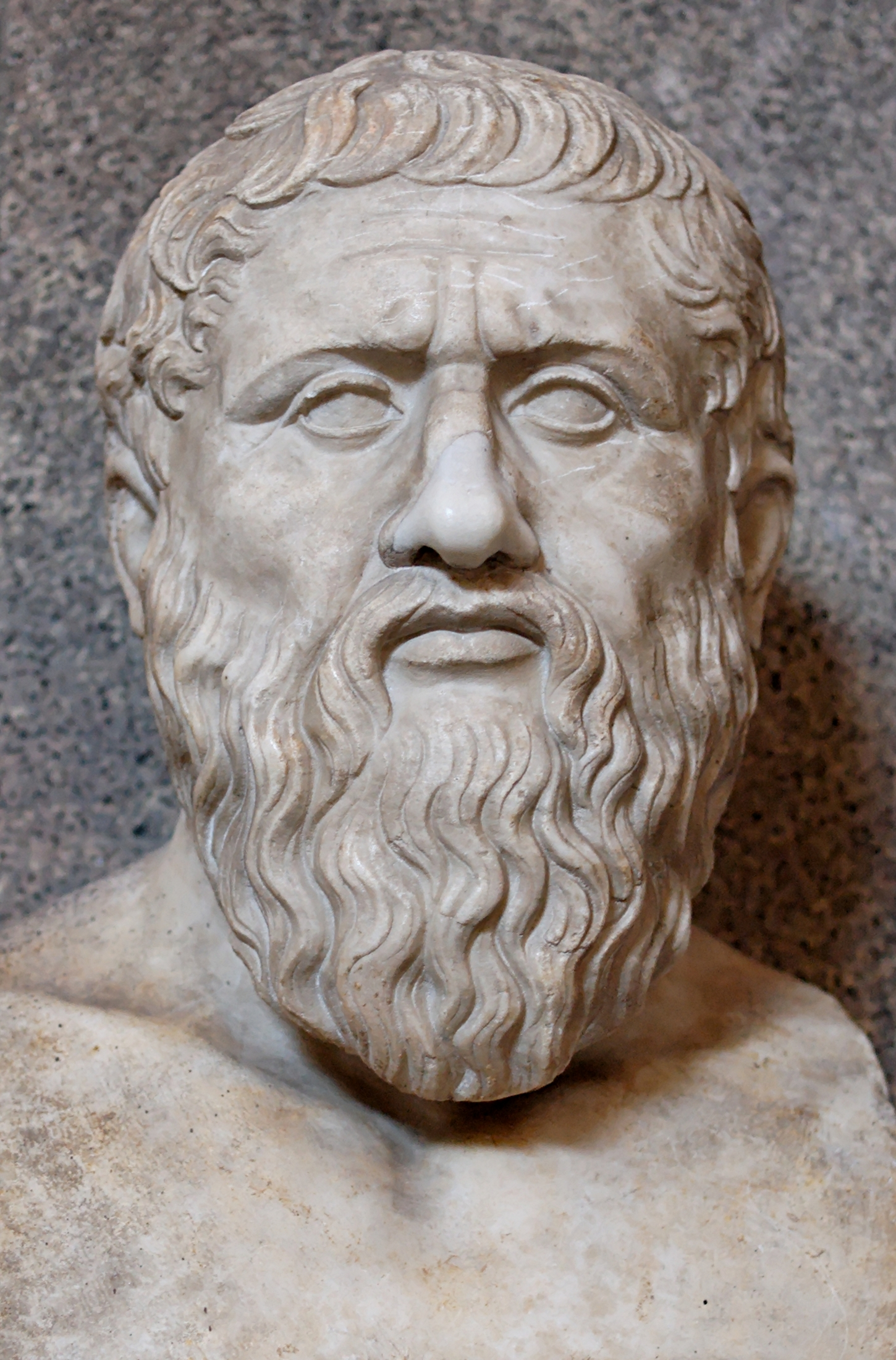
The three great philosophers of the classical era: Socrates, Plato and Aristotle

The ethnogenesis of a common Hellenic identity is linked to the development of Pan-Hellenism in the 8th century BC. According to some scholars, the foundational event was the Olympic Games in 776 BC, when the idea of a common Hellenism among the Greek tribes was first translated into a shared cultural experience and Hellenism was primarily a matter of common culture. The works of Homer (i.e. Iliad and Odyssey) and Hesiod (i.e. Theogony) were written in the 8th century BC, becoming the basis of the ancient Greek religion, ethos, history and mythology. The Oracle of Apollo at Delphi was established in this period.

The classical period of Greek civilization covers a time spanning from the early 5th century BC to the death of Alexander the Great, in 323 BC (some authors prefer to split this period into "Classical", from the end of the Greco-Persian Wars to the end of the Peloponnesian War, and "Fourth Century", up to the death of Alexander). It is so named because it set the standards by which Greek civilization would be judged in later eras. The Classical period is also described as the "Golden Age" of Greek civilization, and its art, philosophy, architecture and literature would be instrumental in the formation and development of Western culture.

At the battles of Marathon, Thermopylae, Salamis, and Platea, some Greek city-states formed a victorious alliance led by Sparta and Athens. The Delian League, under the leadership of Athens, continued the war with the Achaemenid Empire after the end of the Persian invasions.

While the Greeks of the classical era understood themselves to belong to a common Hellenic genos, their first loyalty was to their city and they saw nothing incongruous about warring, often brutally, with other Greek city-states. The Peloponnesian War, the large scale civil war between the two most powerful Greek city-states Athens and Sparta and their allies, left both greatly weakened. A brief Spartan hegemony, and then a short-lived Theban hegemony, followed up until the Battle of Mantinea in 362 BC.

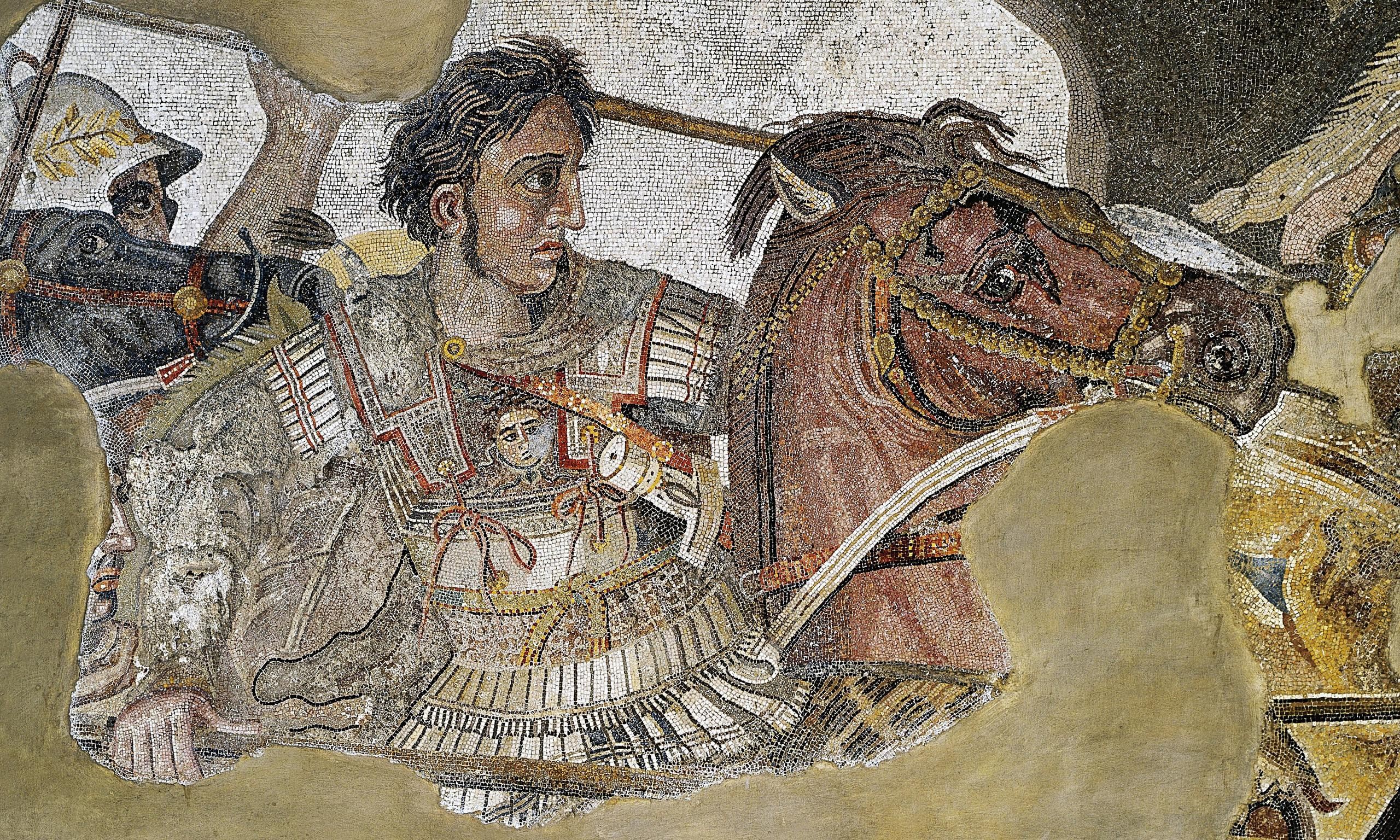
Alexander the Great, whose conquests led to the Hellenistic Age

After the rise of Macedon and the Battle of Chaeronea, most of the feuding Greek city-states became members of the Hellenic league under the leadership of Philip, the Argead king of Macedon, in order to invade the Achaemenid Empire. The Pan-Hellenic campaign had the slogans of "freeing the Greeks" in Asia and "punishing the Persians" for their past sacrileges during their own invasion of Greece a century and a half earlier. The campaign was led successfully by his son Alexander the Great, as Philip was assassinated in 336 BC.

Alexander's toppling of the Achaemenid Empire, after his victories at the battles of the Granicus, Issus and Gaugamela, and his advance as far as modern-day Pakistan and Tajikistan, provided an important outlet for Greek culture, via the creation of colonies and trade routes along the way. While the Alexandrian empire did not survive its creator's death intact, the cultural implications of the spread of Hellenism across much of the Middle East and Asia were to prove long lived as Greek became the lingua franca, a position it retained even in Roman times. Many Greeks settled in Hellenistic cities like Alexandria, Antioch and Seleucia.

==== Hellenistic period ====
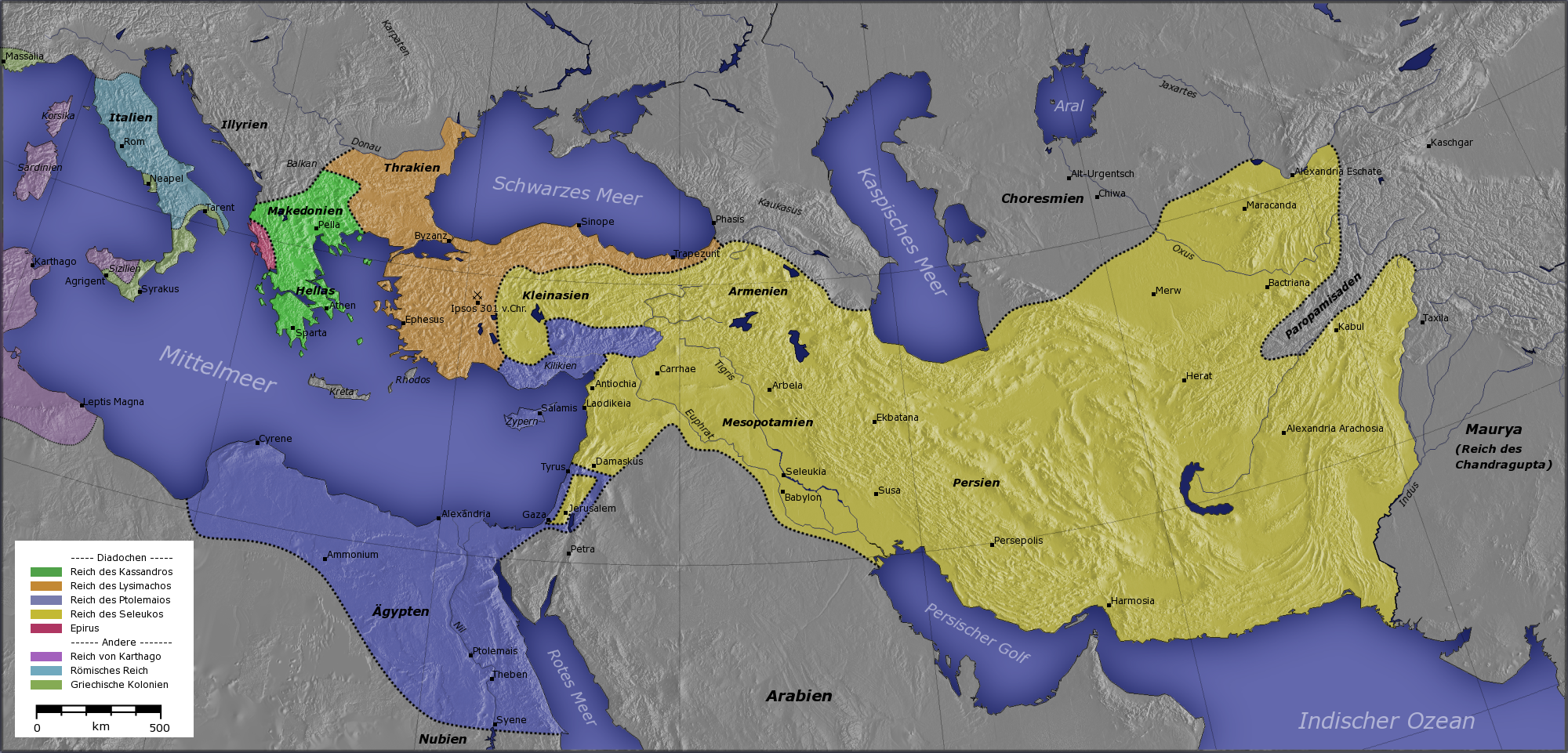
The Hellenistic realms c. 300 BC as divided by the Diadochi; the Μacedonian Kingdom of Cassander (green), the Ptolemaic Kingdom (dark blue), the Seleucid Empire (yellow), the areas controlled by Lysimachus (orange) and Epirus (red)

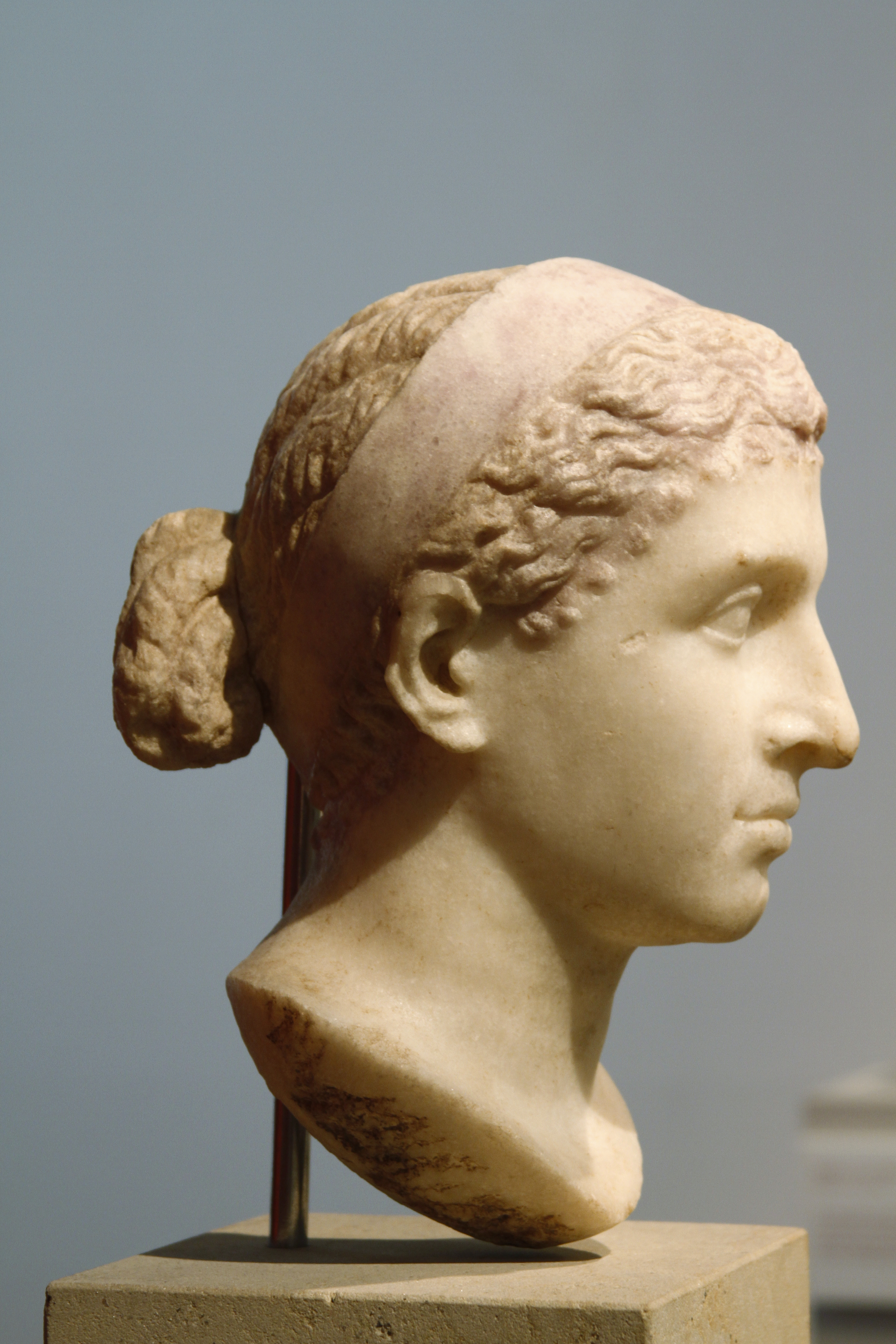
Bust of Cleopatra VII (Altes Museum, Berlin), the last ruler of a Hellenistic kingdom (apart from the Indo-Greek Kingdom)

The Hellenistic civilization was the next period of Greek civilization, the beginnings of which are usually placed at Alexander's death. This Hellenistic age, so called because it saw the partial Hellenization of many non-Greek cultures, extending all the way into India and Bactria, both of which maintained Greek cultures and governments for centuries. The end is often placed around conquest of Egypt by Rome in 30 BC, although the Indo-Greek kingdoms lasted for a few more decades.

This age saw the Greeks move towards larger cities and a reduction in the importance of the city-state. These larger cities were parts of the still larger Kingdoms of the Diadochi. Greeks, however, remained aware of their past, chiefly through the study of the works of Homer and the classical authors. An important factor in maintaining Greek identity was contact with barbarian (non-Greek) peoples, which was deepened in the new cosmopolitan environment of the multi-ethnic Hellenistic kingdoms. This led to a strong desire among Greeks to organize the transmission of the Hellenic paideia to the next generation. Greek science, technology and mathematics are generally considered to have reached their peak during the Hellenistic period.

In the Indo-Greek and Greco-Bactrian kingdoms, Greco-Buddhism was spreading and Greek missionaries would play an important role in propagating it to China. Further east, the Greeks of Alexandria Eschate became known to the Chinese people as the Dayuan.

=== Roman Empire ===
Between 280 BC and 30 BC, after the Pyrrhic, Macedonian, and Mithridatic Wars, most of the Hellenistic world was conquered by Rome, and almost all of the world's Greek speakers lived as citizens or subjects of the Roman Empire. Despite their military superiority, the Romans admired and became heavily influenced by the achievements of Greek culture, hence Horace's famous statement: Graecia capta ferum victorem cepit ("Greece, although captured, took its wild conqueror captive"). In the centuries following the Roman conquest of the Greek world, the Greek and Roman cultures merged into a single Greco-Roman culture.

In the religious sphere, this was a period of profound change. The spiritual revolution that took place, saw a waning of the old Greek religion, whose decline beginning in the 3rd century BC continued with the introduction of new religious movements from the East. The cults of deities like Isis and Mithra were introduced into the Greek world. Greek-speaking communities of the Hellenized East were instrumental in the spread of early Christianity in the 2nd and 3rd centuries, and Christianity's early leaders and writers (notably Saint Paul) were generally Greek-speaking, though none were from Greece proper. However, Greece itself had a tendency to cling to paganism and was not one of the influential centers of early Christianity: in fact, some ancient Greek religious practices remained in vogue until the end of the 4th century, with some areas such as the southeastern Peloponnese remaining pagan until well into the mid-Byzantine 10th century AD. The region of Tsakonia remained pagan until the ninth century and as such its inhabitants were referred to as Hellenes, in the sense of being pagan, by their Christianized Greek brethren in mainstream Byzantine society.

While ethnic distinctions still existed in the Roman Empire, they became secondary to religious considerations, and the renewed empire used Christianity as a tool to support its cohesion and promote a robust Roman national identity. From the early centuries of the Common Era, the Greeks self-identified as Romans (Greek: Ῥωμαῖοι Rhōmaîoi). By that time, the name Hellenes denoted pagans but was revived as an ethnonym in the 11th century.

=== Byzantine Greeks ===
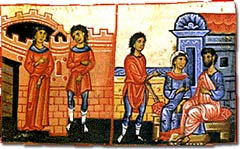
Scenes of marriage and family life in Constantinople

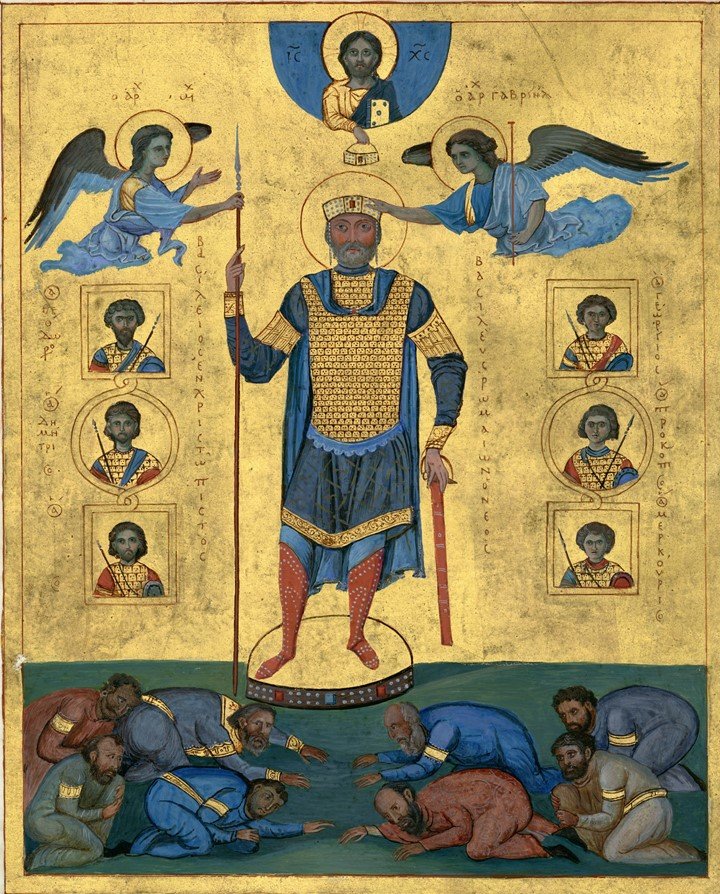
Emperor Basil II (11th century) is credited with reviving the Byzantine Empire.

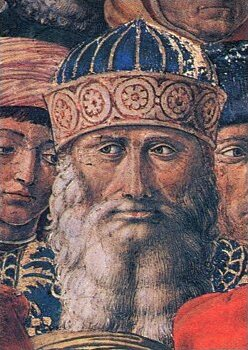
Gemistos Plethon, one of the most renowned philosophers of the late Byzantine era, a chief pioneer of the revival of Greek scholarship in Western Europe

During most of the Middle Ages, the Byzantine Greeks self-identified as Rhōmaîoi (Ῥωμαῖοι, "Romans", meaning citizens of the Roman Empire), a term which in the Greek language had become synonymous with Christian Greeks. The Latinizing term Graikoí (Γραικοί, "Greeks") was also used, though its use was less common, and nonexistent in official Byzantine political correspondence, prior to the Fourth Crusade of 1204. The Eastern Roman Empire (today conventionally named the Byzantine Empire, a name not used during its own time) became increasingly influenced by Greek culture after the 7th century when Emperor Heraclius (r. 610–641 AD) decided to make Greek the empire's official language. Although the Catholic Church recognized the Eastern Empire's claim to the Roman legacy for several centuries, after Pope Leo III crowned Charlemagne, king of the Franks, as the "Roman Emperor" on 25 December 800, an act which eventually led to the formation of the Holy Roman Empire, the Latin West started to favour the Franks and began to refer to the Eastern Roman Empire largely as the Empire of the Greeks (Imperium Graecorum). While this Latin term for the ancient Hellenes could be used neutrally, its use by Westerners from the 9th century onwards in order to challenge Byzantine claims to ancient Roman heritage rendered it a derogatory exonym for the Byzantines who barely used it, mostly in contexts relating to the West, such as texts relating to the Council of Florence, to present the Western viewpoint. Additionally, among the Germanic and the Slavic peoples, the Rhōmaîoi were just called Greeks.

There are three schools of thought regarding this Byzantine Roman identity in contemporary Byzantine scholarship: The first considers "Romanity" the mode of self-identification of the subjects of a multi-ethnic empire at least up to the 12th century, where the average subject identified as Roman; a perennialist approach, which views Romanity as the medieval expression of a continuously existing Greek nation; while a third view considers the eastern Roman identity as a pre-modern national identity. The Byzantine Greeks' essential values were drawn from both Christianity and the Homeric tradition of ancient Greece.

A distinct Greek identity re-emerged in the 11th century in educated circles and became more forceful after the fall of Constantinople to the Crusaders of the Fourth Crusade in 1204. In the Empire of Nicaea, a small circle of the elite used the term "Hellene" as a term of self-identification. For example, in a letter to Pope Gregory IX, the Nicaean emperor John III Doukas Vatatzes (r. 1221–1254) claimed to have received the gift of royalty from Constantine the Great, and put emphasis on his "Hellenic" descent, exalting the wisdom of the Greek people. After the Byzantines recaptured Constantinople, however, in 1261, Rhomaioi became again dominant as a term for self-description and there are few traces of Hellene (Έλληνας), such as in the writings of George Gemistos Plethon, who abandoned Christianity and in whose writings culminated the secular tendency in the interest in the classical past. However, it was the combination of Orthodox Christianity with a specifically Greek identity that shaped the Greeks' notion of themselves in the empire's twilight years. In the twilight years of the Byzantine Empire, prominent Byzantine personalities proposed referring to the Byzantine Emperor as the "Emperor of the Hellenes". These largely rhetorical expressions of Hellenic identity were confined within intellectual circles, but were continued by Byzantine intellectuals who participated in the Italian Renaissance.

The interest in the Classical Greek heritage was complemented by a renewed emphasis on Greek Orthodox identity, which was reinforced in the late Medieval and Ottoman Greeks' links with their fellow Orthodox Christians in the Russian Empire. These were further strengthened following the fall of the Empire of Trebizond in 1461, after which and until the second Russo-Turkish War of 1828–29 hundreds of thousands of Pontic Greeks fled or migrated from the Pontic Alps and Armenian Highlands to southern Russia and the Russian South Caucasus (see also Greeks in Russia, Greeks in Armenia, Greeks in Georgia, and Caucasian Greeks).

These Byzantine Greeks were largely responsible for the preservation of the literature of the classical era. Byzantine grammarians were those principally responsible for carrying, in person and in writing, ancient Greek grammatical and literary studies to the West during the 15th century, giving the Italian Renaissance a major boost. The Aristotelian philosophical tradition was nearly unbroken in the Greek world for almost two thousand years, until the Fall of Constantinople in 1453.

To the Slavic world, the Byzantine Greeks contributed by the dissemination of literacy and Christianity. The most notable example of the latter was the work of the two Byzantine Greek brothers, the monks Saints Cyril and Methodius from the port city of Thessalonica, capital of the theme of Thessalonica, who are credited today with formalizing the first Slavic alphabet.

=== Ottoman Greeks ===
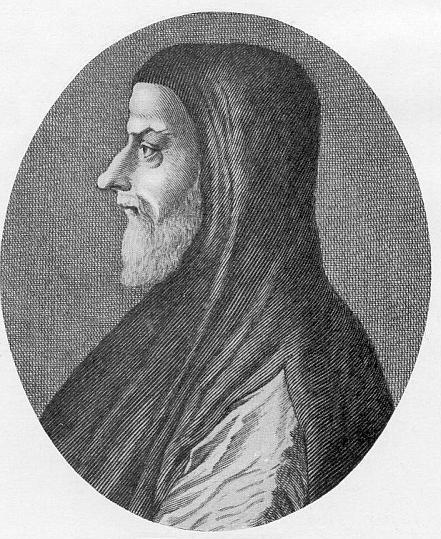
The Byzantine scholar and cardinal Basilios Bessarion (1395/1403–1472) played a key role in transmitting classical knowledge to Western Europe, contributing to the Renaissance.

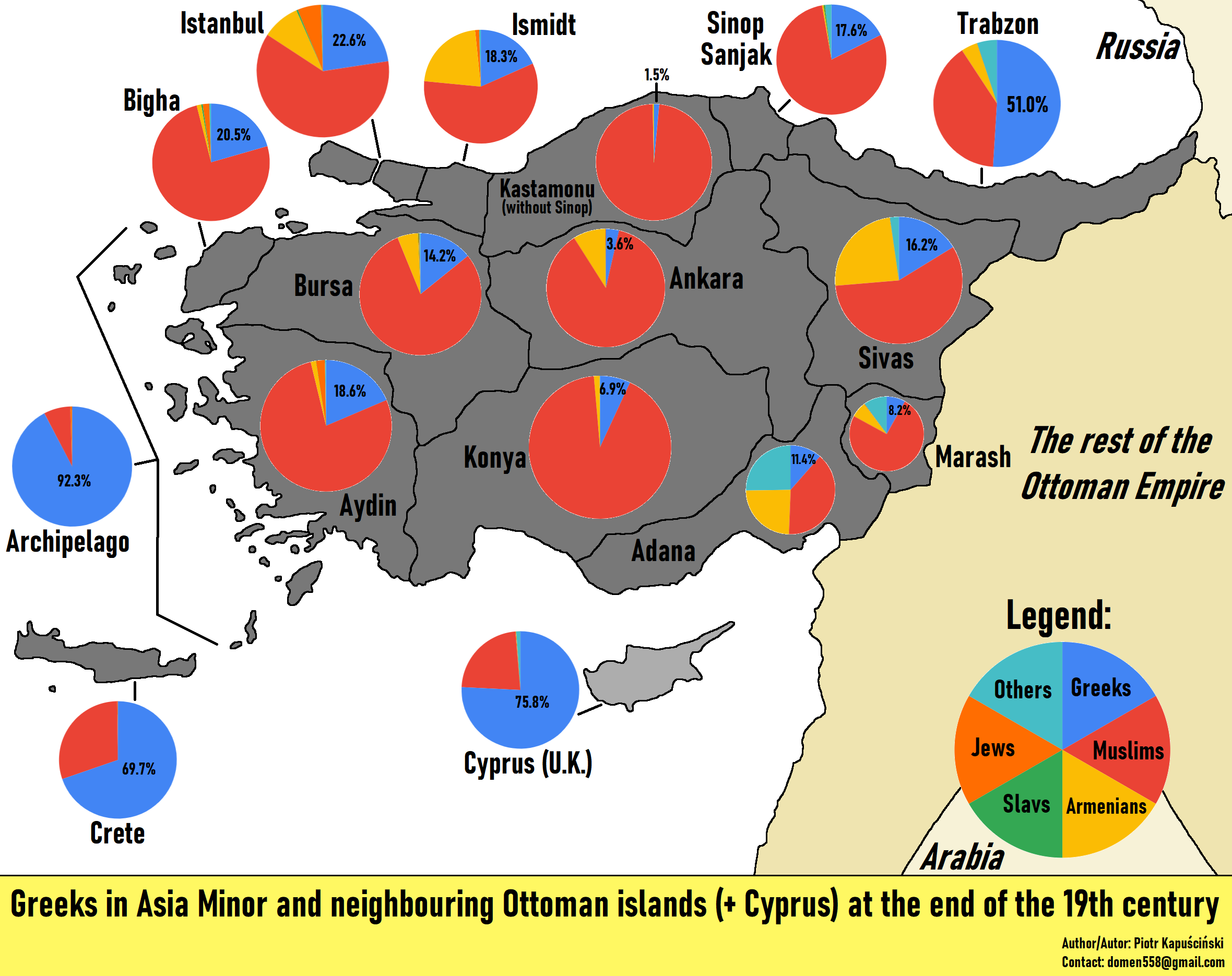
Distribution of ethnic Greek population in Anatolia at the end of the 19th century

Following the Fall of Constantinople on 29 May 1453, many Greeks sought better employment and education opportunities by leaving for the West, particularly Italy, Central Europe, Germany and Russia. Greeks are greatly credited for the European cultural revolution, later called the Renaissance. In Greek-inhabited territory itself, Greeks came to play a leading role in the Ottoman Empire, due in part to the fact that the central hub of the empire, politically, culturally, and socially, was based on Western Thrace and Macedonia, both in Northern Greece, and of course was centred on the mainly Greek-populated, former Byzantine capital, Constantinople. As a direct consequence of this situation, Greek-speakers came to play a hugely important role in the Ottoman trading and diplomatic establishment, as well as in the church. Added to this, in the first half of the Ottoman period men of Greek origin made up a significant proportion of the Ottoman army, navy, and state bureaucracy, having been levied as adolescents (along with especially Albanians and Serbs) into Ottoman service through the devshirme. Many Ottomans of Greek (or Albanian or Serb) origin were therefore to be found within the Ottoman forces which governed the provinces, from Ottoman Egypt, to Ottomans occupied Yemen and Algeria, frequently as provincial governors.

For those that remained under the Ottoman Empire's millet system, religion was the defining characteristic of national groups (milletler), so the exonym "Greeks" (Rumlar from the name Rhomaioi) was applied by the Ottomans to all members of the Rum millet and Orthodox Church, regardless of their language or ethnic origin. The Greek speakers were the only ethnic group to actually call themselves Romioi, (as opposed to being so named by others) and, at least those educated, considered their ethnicity (genos) to be Hellenic. There were, however, many Greeks who escaped the second-class status of Christians inherent in the Ottoman millet system, according to which Muslims were explicitly awarded senior status and preferential treatment. These Greeks either emigrated, particularly to their fellow Orthodox Christian protector, the Russian Empire, or simply converted to Islam, often only very superficially and whilst remaining crypto-Christian. The most notable examples of large-scale conversion to Turkish Islam among those today defined as Greek Muslims—excluding those who had to convert as a matter of course on being recruited through the devshirme—were to be found in Crete (Cretan Turks), Greek Macedonia (for example among the Vallahades of western Macedonia), and among Pontic Greeks in the Pontic Alps and Armenian Highlands. Several Ottoman sultans and princes were also of part Greek origin, with mothers who were either Greek concubines or princesses from Byzantine noble families, one famous example being sultan Selim the Grim (r. 1517–1520), whose mother Gülbahar Hatun was a Pontic Greek.

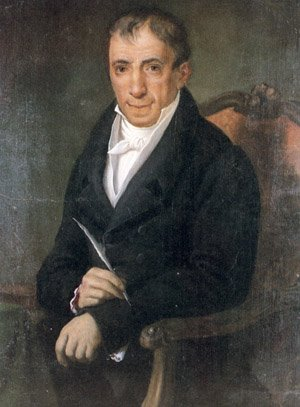
Adamantios Korais, leading figure of the Modern Greek Enlightenment

The roots of Greek success in the Ottoman Empire can be traced to the Greek tradition of education and commerce exemplified in the Phanariotes. It was the wealth of the extensive merchant class that provided the material basis for the intellectual revival that was the prominent feature of Greek life in the half century and more leading to the outbreak of the Greek War of Independence in 1821. Not coincidentally, on the eve of 1821, the three most important centres of Greek learning were situated in Chios, Smyrna and Aivali, all three major centres of Greek commerce. Greek success was also favoured by Greek domination in the leadership of the Eastern Orthodox church.

=== Modern Greece ===
The movement of the Greek enlightenment, the Greek expression of the Age of Enlightenment, contributed not only in the promotion of education, culture and printing among the Greeks, but also in the case of independence from the Ottomans, and the restoration of the term "Hellene". Adamantios Korais, probably the most important intellectual of the movement, advocated the use of the term "Hellene" (Έλληνας) or "Graikos" (Γραικός) in the place of Romiós, that was seen negatively by him.

The relationship between ethnic Greek identity and Greek Orthodox religion continued after the creation of the modern Greek nation-state in 1830. According to the second article of the first Greek constitution of 1822, a Greek was defined as any native Christian resident of the Kingdom of Greece, a clause removed by 1840. A century later, when the Treaty of Lausanne was signed between Greece and Turkey in 1923, the two countries agreed to use religion as the determinant for ethnic identity for the purposes of population exchange, although most of the Greeks displaced (over a million of the total 1.5 million) had already been driven out by the time the agreement was signed. (Note: While Greek authorities signed the agreement legalizing the population exchange this was done on the insistence of Mustafa Kemal Atatürk and after a million Greeks had already been expelled from Asia Minor (Gilbar 1997, p. 8).) The Greek genocide, in particular the harsh removal of Pontian Greeks from the southern shore area of the Black Sea, contemporaneous with and following the failed Greek Asia Minor Campaign, was part of this process of Turkification of the Ottoman Empire and the placement of its economy and trade, then largely in Greek hands under ethnic Turkish control.

In October 1940, Fascist Italy demanded the surrender of Greece, but it refused, and, in the Greco-Italian War, Greece repelled Italian forces into Albania. French general Charles de Gaulle praised the fierceness of the Greek resistance, but the country fell to urgently dispatched German forces during the Battle of Greece. The Nazis proceeded to administer Athens and Thessaloniki, while other regions were given to Fascist Italy and Bulgaria. Over 100,000 civilians died of starvation during the winter of 1941–1942, tens of thousands more died because of reprisals by Nazis and collaborators, the economy was ruined, and most Greek Jews (tens of thousands) were deported and murdered in Nazi concentration camps. The Greek Resistance, one of the most effective resistance movements, fought against the Nazis. The German occupiers committed numerous crimes, such as atrocities, mass executions, and wholesale slaughter of civilians and destruction of towns and villages, in reprisals. Hundreds of villages were systematically torched and almost one million Greeks left homeless. The Germans executed around 21,000 Greeks, the Bulgarians 40,000, and the Italians 9,000.

== Identity ==
=== Names ===
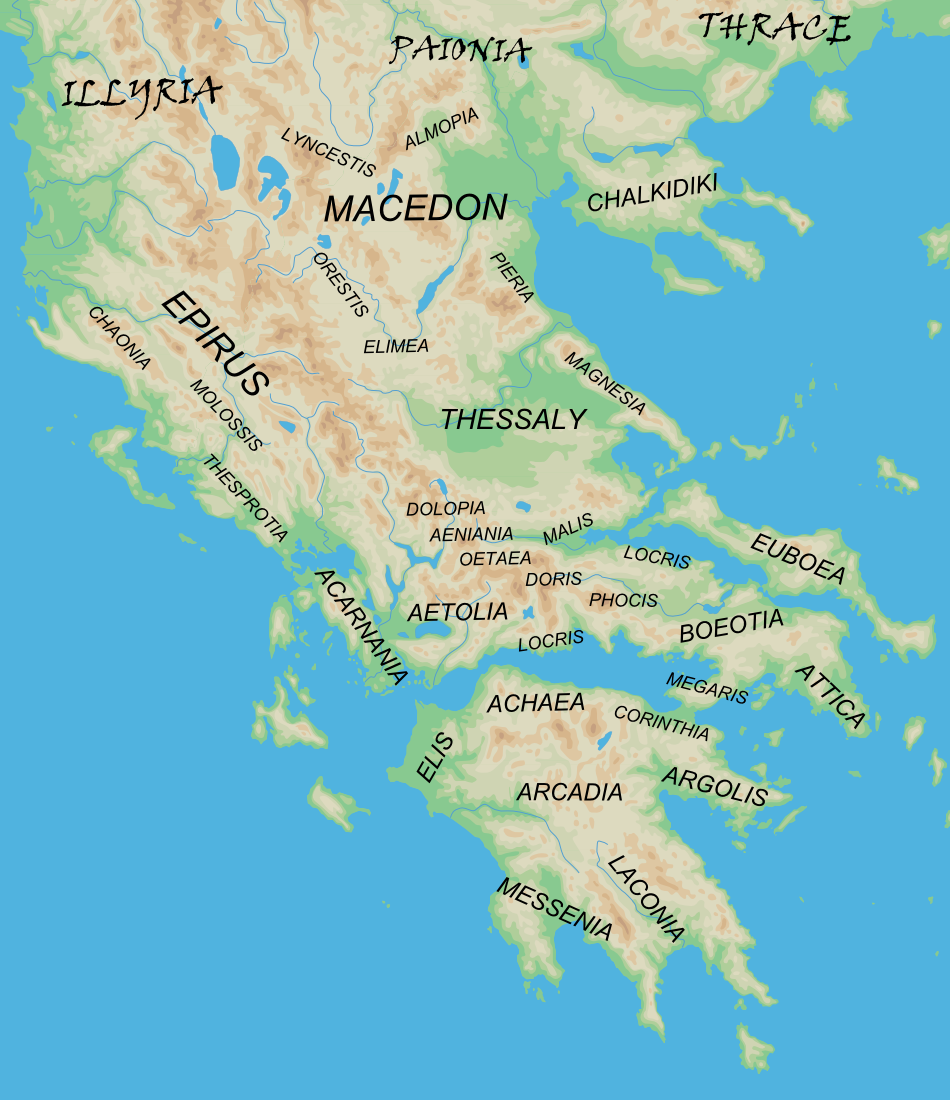
Map showing the major regions of mainland ancient Greece, and adjacent "barbarian" lands

The English names Greece and Greek are derived, via the Latin Graecia and Graecus, from the name of the Graeci (Γραικοί, Graikoí; singular Γραικός, Graikós), who were among the first ancient Greek tribes to settle southern Italy (the so-called "Magna Graecia"). The term is possibly derived from the Proto-Indo-European root *ǵerh₂-, "to grow old", more specifically from Graea (ancient city), said by Aristotle to be the oldest in Greece, and the source of colonists for the Naples area.

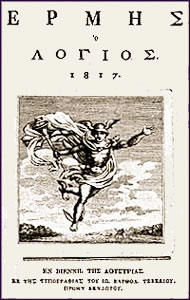
The cover of Hermes o Logios, a Greek literary publication of the late 18th and early 19th centuries in Vienna with major contribution to the Modern Greek Enlightenment

Greeks and Greek-speakers have used different names to refer to themselves collectively. The term Achaeans (Ἀχαιοί) is one of the collective names for the Greeks in Homer's Iliad and Odyssey (the Homeric "long-haired Achaeans" would have been a part of the Mycenaean civilization that dominated Greece from c. 1600 BC until 1100 BC). The other common names are Danaans (Δαναοί) and Argives (Ἀργεῖοι) while Panhellenes (Πανέλληνες) and Hellenes (Ἕλληνες) both appear only once in the Iliad; all of these terms were used, synonymously, to denote a common Greek identity. In the historical period, Herodotus identified the Achaeans of the northern Peloponnese as descendants of the earlier, Homeric Achaeans.

Homer refers to the "Hellenes" as a relatively small tribe settled in Thessalic Phthia, with its warriors under the command of Achilleus. The Parian Chronicle says that Phthia was the homeland of the Hellenes and that this name was given to those previously called Greeks (Γραικοί). In Greek mythology, Hellen, the patriarch of the Hellenes who ruled around Phthia, was the son of Pyrrha and Deucalion, the only survivors after the Great Deluge. The Greek philosopher Aristotle names ancient Hellas as an area in Epirus between Dodona and the Achelous river, the location of the Great Deluge of Deucalion, a land occupied by the Selloi and the "Greeks" who later came to be known as "Hellenes". In the Homeric tradition, the Selloi were the priests of Dodonian Zeus.

In the Hesiodic Catalogue of Women, Graecus is presented as the son of Zeus and Pandora II, sister of Hellen the patriarch of the Hellenes. According to the Parian Chronicle, when Deucalion became king of Phthia, the Graikoi (Γραικοί) were named Hellenes. Aristotle notes in his Meteorologica that the Hellenes were related to the Graikoi.

=== Concepts ===
The terms used to define Greekness have varied throughout history but were never limited or completely identified with membership to a Greek state. Herodotus gave a famous account of what defined Greek (Hellenic) ethnic identity in his day, enumerating

1. shared descent (ὅμαιμον, hómaimon, 'of the same blood')
2. shared language (ὁμόγλωσσον, homóglōsson, 'speaking the same tongue')
3. shared sanctuaries and sacrifices (θεῶν ἱδρύματά τε κοινὰ καὶ θυσίαι, theôn hidrúmatá te koinà kaì thusíai, 'common foundations, common sacrifices to gods')
4. shared customs (ἤθεα ὁμότροπα, ḗthea homótropa, 'customs of like fashion').

By Western standards, the term Greeks has traditionally referred to any native speakers of the Greek language, whether Mycenaean, Byzantine or modern Greek. Byzantine Greeks self-identified as Romaioi ("Romans"), Graikoi ("Greeks") and Christianoi ("Christians") since they were the political heirs of imperial Rome, the descendants of their classical Greek forebears and followers of the Apostles; during the mid-to-late Byzantine period (11th–13th century), a growing number of Byzantine Greek intellectuals deemed themselves Hellenes although for most Greek-speakers, "Hellene" still meant pagan. On the eve of the Fall of Constantinople the Last Emperor urged his soldiers to remember that they were the descendants of Greeks and Romans.

Before the establishment of the modern Greek nation-state, the link between ancient and modern Greeks was emphasized by the scholars of Greek Enlightenment especially by Rigas Feraios. In his "Political Constitution", he addresses to the nation as "the people descendant of the Greeks". The modern Greek state was created in 1829, when the Greeks liberated a part of their historic homelands, Peloponnese, from the Ottoman Empire. The large Greek diaspora and merchant class were instrumental in transmitting the ideas of western romantic nationalism and philhellenism, which together with the conception of Hellenism, formulated during the last centuries of the Byzantine Empire, formed the basis of the Diafotismos and the current conception of Hellenism.

The Greeks today are a nation in the meaning of an ethnos, defined by possessing Greek culture and having a Greek mother tongue, not by citizenship, race, and religion or by being subjects of any particular state. In ancient and medieval times and to some extent today the Greek term was genos, which also indicates a common ancestry.

Because Greek civilization predates Western civilization and has had historically strong ties to the East, whether Greeks are inherently European, Western, or even white has been hotly debated among Greeks. During the 1977 negotiations for Greece's intergration into the European Economic Community, Prime Minister Konstantinos Karamanlis famously interrupted Opposition Leader Andreas Papandreou to say "Greece belongs to the Western World, owing to tradition or by way of interests, Greece belongs to the Western World... we belong to the West!". Papandreou replied "we prefer to belong to the Greeks", which received laughter and applause and has become an iconic line. The Eurosceptic context of Papandreou's remarks reflect the consolidation of Greek identity around the West in the aftermath of the Greek genocide and U.S. hegemony in the Cold War, the latter of which irritated many Greeks on the political left. Antonios Nestoras describes Greece as, unlike its former Ottoman neighbours in the Levant, having "followed a different, definitely faster trajectory – a shortcut perhaps – in the club of western European nations".

The whiteness of Greeks has been disputed, particularly in the contexts of efforts by those on the far-right in the West to claim Ancient Greece as part of a "white civilization". Classicist James H. Dee has stated that "the Greeks do not describe themselves as 'White people' – or as anything else because [in antiquity] they had no regular word in their color vocabulary for themselves." Greeks were for a long time excluded from the 'white' group in United States policy and politics.

=== Continuity ===
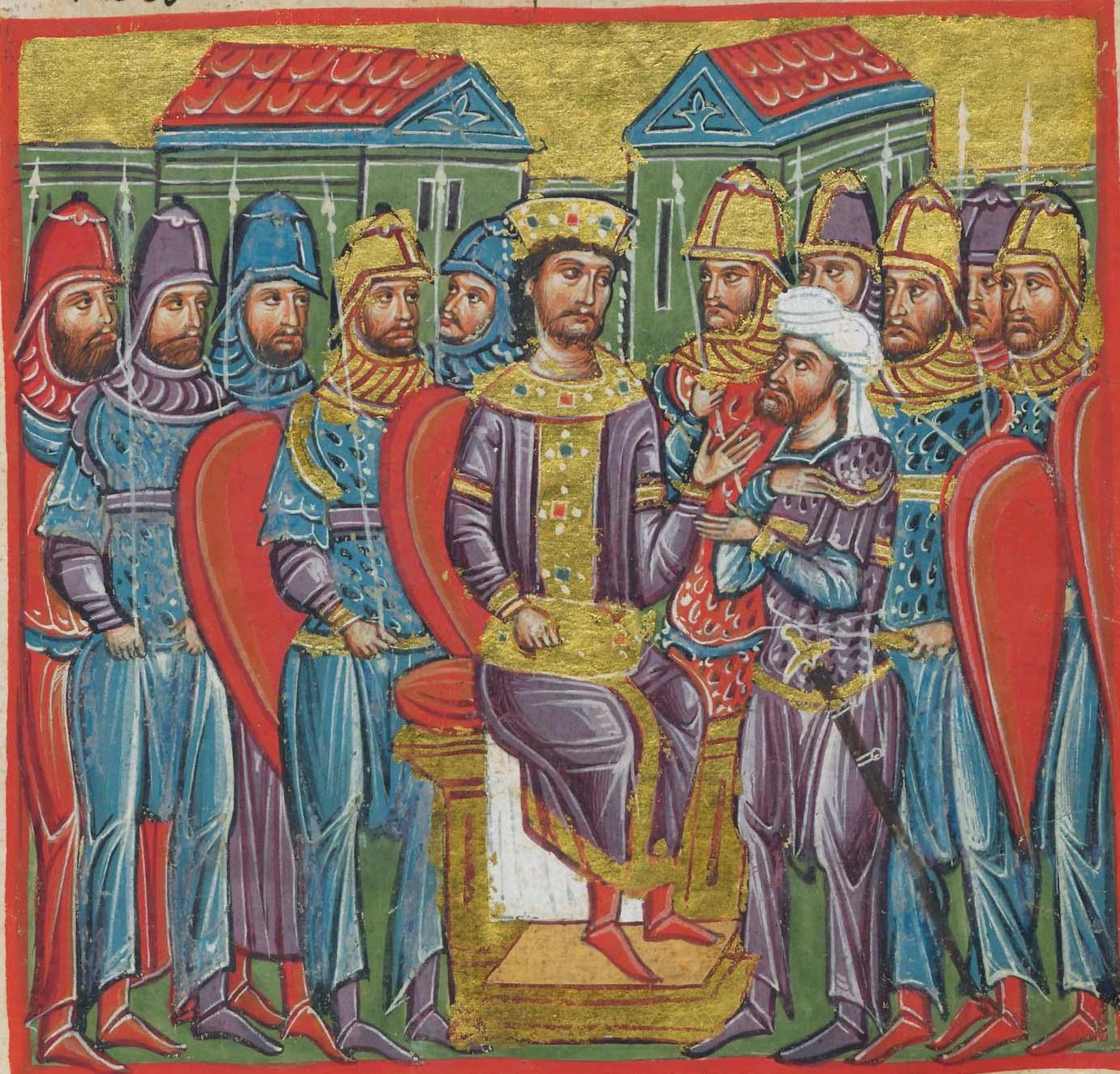
Alexander the Great in Byzantine Emperor's clothes, from the Venice Alexander Romance (late 14th century)

The most obvious link between modern and ancient Greeks is their language, which has a documented tradition from at least the 14th century BC to the present day, albeit with a break during the Greek Dark Ages from which written records are absent (11th–8th cent. BC, though the Cypriot syllabary was in use during this period). Scholars compare its continuity of tradition to Chinese alone. Since its inception, Hellenism was primarily a matter of common culture and the national continuity of the Greek world is a lot more certain than its demographic. Yet, Hellenism also embodied an ancestral dimension through aspects of Athenian literature that developed and influenced ideas of descent based on autochthony. During the later years of the Eastern Roman Empire, areas such as Ionia and Constantinople experienced a Hellenic revival in language, philosophy, and literature and on classical models of thought and scholarship. This revival provided a powerful impetus to the sense of cultural affinity with ancient Greece and its classical heritage. Throughout their history, the Greeks have retained their language and alphabet, certain values and cultural traditions, customs, a sense of religious and cultural difference and exclusion (the word barbarian was used by 12th-century historian Anna Komnene to describe non-Greek speakers), a sense of Greek identity and common sense of ethnicity despite the undeniable socio-political changes of the past two millennia. In recent anthropological studies, both ancient and modern Greek osteological samples were analyzed demonstrating a bio-genetic affinity and continuity shared between both groups. There is also a direct genetic link between ancient Greeks and modern Greeks.

== Demographics ==
=== Ancient ===
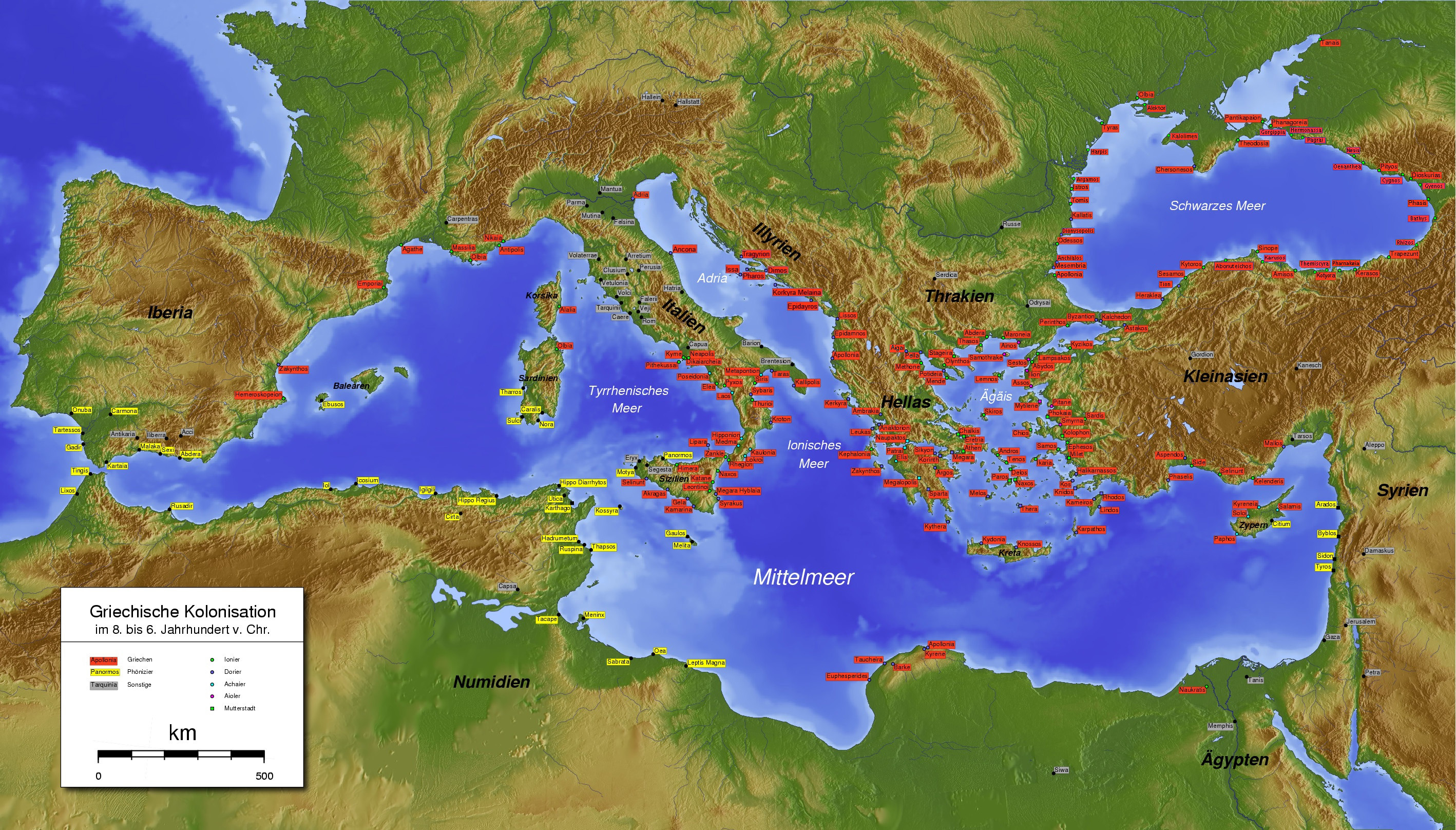
Greek colonization in antiquity

In ancient times, the trading and colonizing activities of the Greek tribes and city states spread the Greek culture, religion and language around the Mediterranean and Black Sea basins, especially in Southern Italy (the so-called "Magna Graecia"), Spain, the south of France and the Black sea coasts. Under Alexander the Great's empire and successor states, Greek and Hellenizing ruling classes were established in the Middle East, India and in Egypt. The Hellenistic period is characterized by a new wave of Greek colonization that established Greek cities and kingdoms in Asia and Africa. Under the Roman Empire, easier movement of people spread Greeks across the Empire and in the eastern territories, Greek became the lingua franca rather than Latin. The modern-day Griko community of southern Italy, numbering about 60,000, may represent a living remnant of the ancient Greek populations of Italy.

=== Modern ===
Today, Greeks are the majority ethnic group in the Hellenic Republic, where they constitute 93% of the country's population, and the Republic of Cyprus where they make up 78% of the island's population (excluding Turkish settlers in the occupied part of the country). Greek populations have not traditionally exhibited high rates of growth; a large percentage of Greek population growth since Greece's foundation in 1832 was attributed to annexation of new territories, as well as the influx of 1.5 million Greek refugees after the 1923 population exchange between Greece and Turkey. About 80% of the population of Greece is urban, with 28% concentrated in the city of Athens.

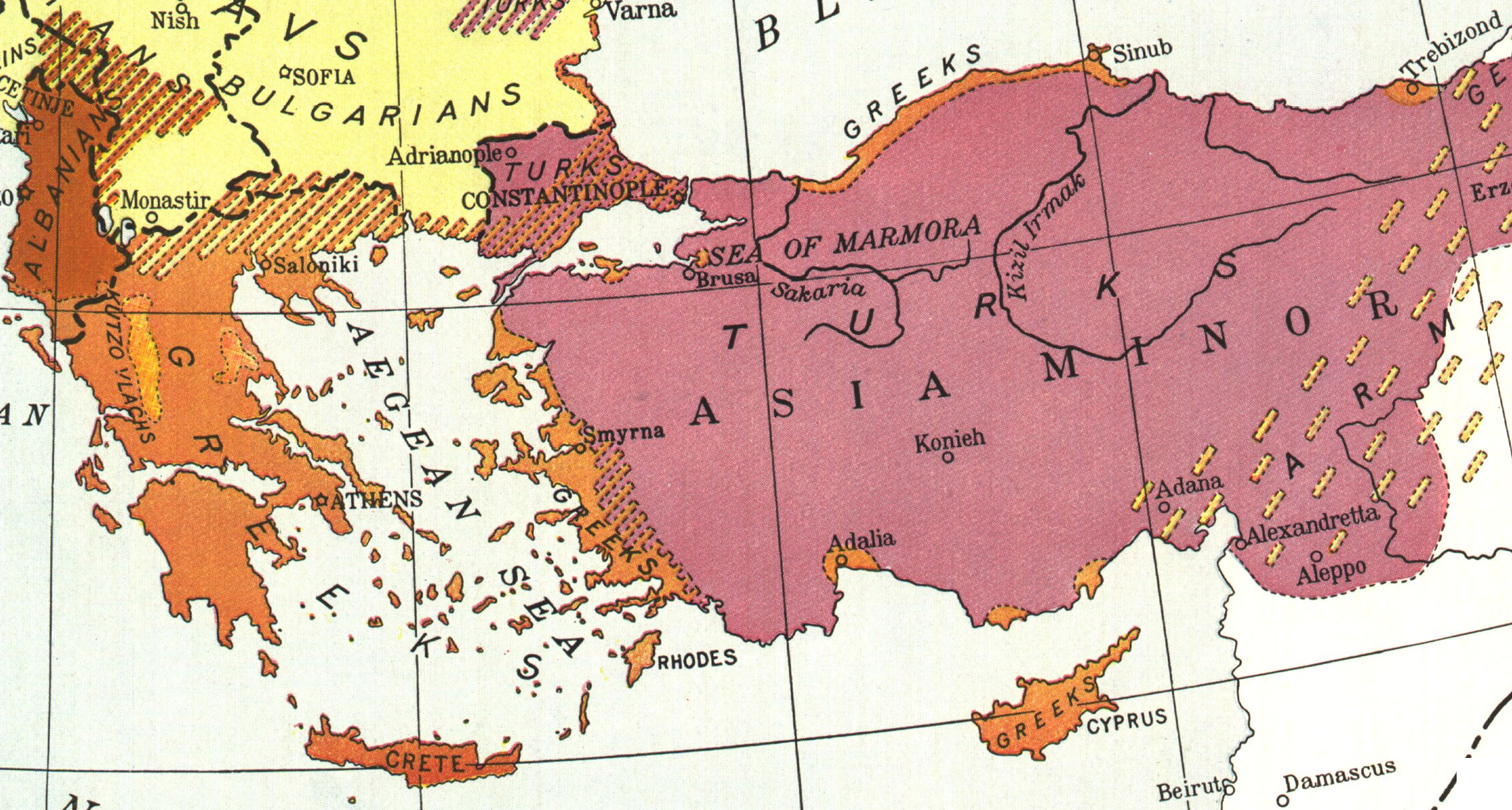
Distribution of ethnic groups in 1918, National Geographic

Greeks from Cyprus have a similar history of emigration, usually to the English-speaking world because of the island's colonization by the British Empire. Waves of emigration followed the Turkish invasion of Cyprus in 1974, while the population decreased between mid-1974 and 1977 as a result of emigration, war losses, and a temporary decline in fertility. After the ethnic cleansing of a third of the Greek population of the island in 1974, there was also an increase in the number of Greek Cypriots leaving, especially for the Middle East, which contributed to a decrease in population that tapered off in the 1990s. Today more than two-thirds of the Greek population in Cyprus is urban.

Around 1990, most Western estimates of the number of ethnic Greeks in Albania were around 200,000 but in the 1990s, a majority of them migrated to Greece. The Greek minority of Turkey, which numbered upwards of 200,000 people after the 1923 exchange, has now dwindled to a few thousand, after the 1955 Constantinople Pogrom and other state sponsored violence and discrimination. This effectively ended, though not entirely, the three-thousand-year-old presence of Hellenism in Asia Minor. There are smaller Greek minorities in the rest of the Balkan countries, the Levant and the Black Sea states, remnants of the Old Greek Diaspora (pre-19th century).

=== Diaspora ===
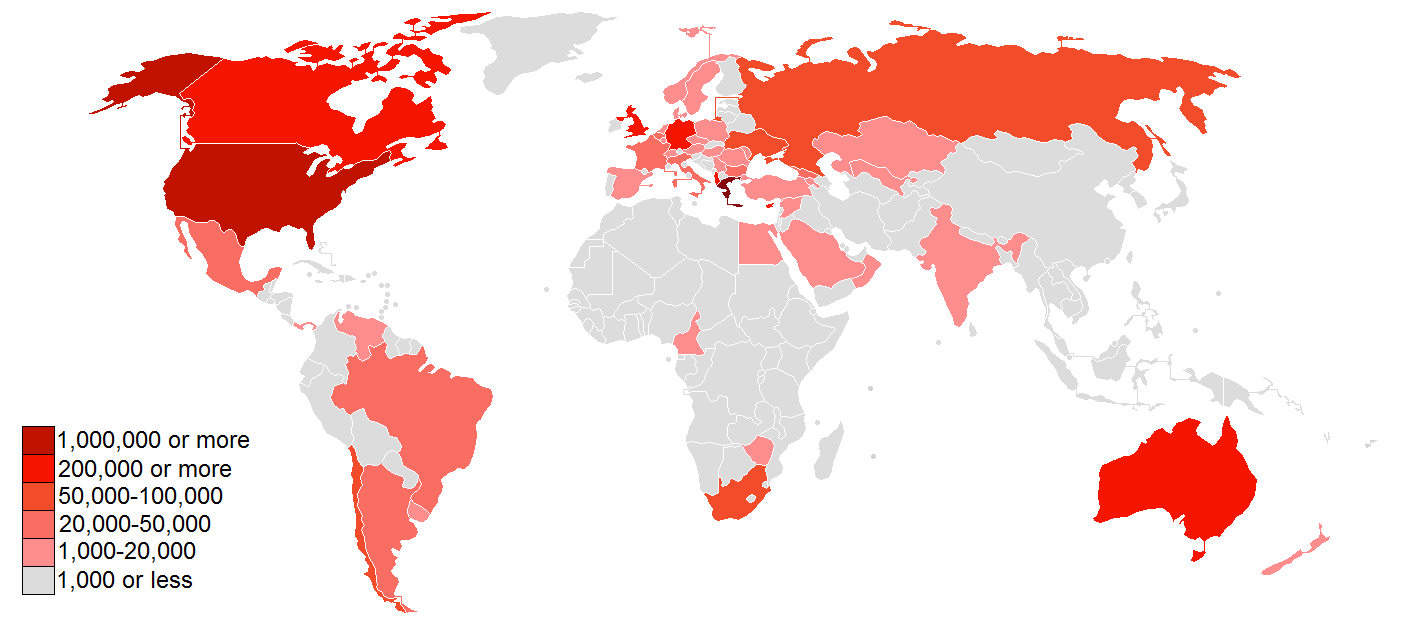
Greek diaspora (20th century)

The total number of Greeks living outside Greece and Cyprus today is a contentious issue. Where census figures are available, they show around three million Greeks outside Greece and Cyprus. Estimates provided by the SAE – World Council of Hellenes Abroad put the figure at around seven million worldwide. According to George Prevelakis of Sorbonne University, the number is closer to just below five million. Integration, intermarriage, and loss of the Greek language influence the self-identification of the Greek diaspora (omogenia). Important centres include New York City, Chicago, Boston, Los Angeles, Sydney, Melbourne, London, Toronto, Montreal, Vancouver, Auckland, and São Paulo. In 2010, the Hellenic Parliament introduced a law that allowed members of the diaspora to vote in Greek elections; this law was repealed in early 2014.

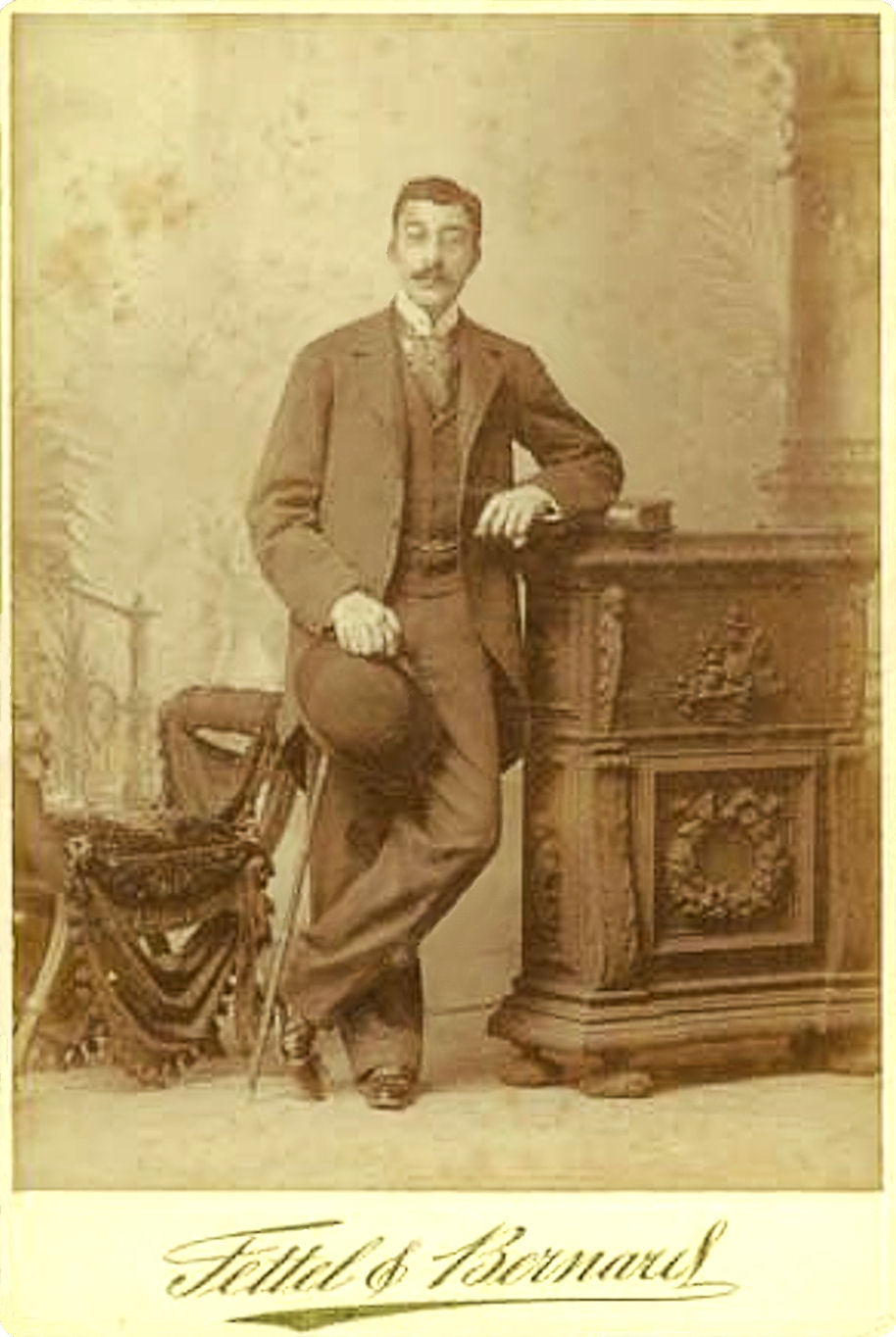
Poet Constantine P. Cavafy, a native of Alexandria, Egypt

During and after the Greek War of Independence, Greeks of the diaspora were important in establishing the fledgling state, raising funds and awareness abroad. Greek merchant families already had contacts in other countries and during the disturbances many set up home around the Mediterranean (notably Marseilles in France, Livorno in Italy, Alexandria in Egypt), Russia (Odesa and Saint Petersburg), and Britain (London and Liverpool) from where they traded, typically in textiles and grain. Businesses frequently comprised the extended family, and with them they brought schools teaching Greek and the Greek Orthodox Church.

As markets changed and they became more established, some families grew their operations to become shippers, financed through the local Greek community, notably with the aid of the Ralli or Vagliano Brothers. With economic success, the Diaspora expanded further across the Levant, North Africa, India and the USA.

In the 20th century, many Greeks left their traditional homelands for economic reasons resulting in large migrations from Greece and Cyprus to the United States, Great Britain, Australia, Canada, Germany, and South Africa, especially after the Second World War (1939–1945), the Greek Civil War (1946–1949), and the Turkish Invasion of Cyprus in 1974.

While official figures remain scarce, polls and anecdotal evidence point to renewed Greek emigration as a result of the Greek financial crisis. According to data published by the Federal Statistical Office of Germany in 2011, 23,800 Greeks emigrated to Germany, a significant increase over the previous year. By comparison, about 9,000 Greeks emigrated to Germany in 2009 and 12,000 in 2010.

== Culture ==
Greek culture has evolved over thousands of years, with its beginning in the Mycenaean civilization, continuing through the classical era, the Hellenistic period, the Roman and Byzantine periods and was profoundly affected by Christianity, which it in turn influenced and shaped. Ottoman Greeks had to endure through several centuries of adversity that culminated in genocide in the 20th century. The Diafotismos is credited with revitalizing Greek culture and giving birth to the synthesis of ancient and medieval elements that characterize it today.

=== Language ===
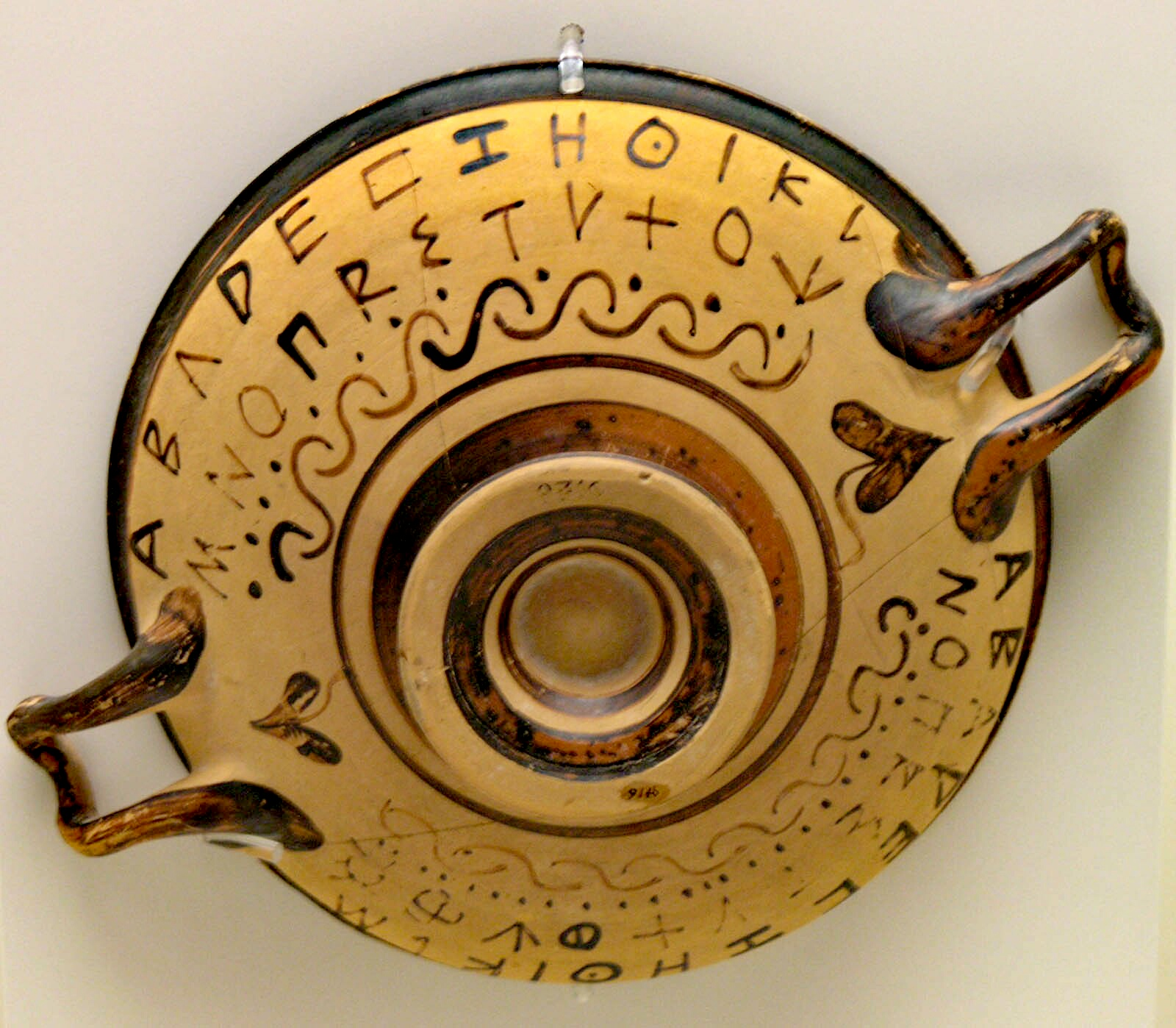
Early Greek alphabet, c. 8th century BC

A Greek speaker

Most Greeks speak the Greek language, an independent branch of the Indo-European languages, with its closest relations possibly being Armenian (see Graeco-Armenian) or the Indo-Iranian languages (see Graeco-Aryan). It has the longest documented history of any living language and Greek literature has a continuous history of over 2,500 years. The oldest inscriptions in Greek are in the Linear B script, dated as far back as 1450 BC. Following the Greek Dark Ages, from which written records are absent, the Greek alphabet appears in the 9th–8th century BC. The Greek alphabet derived from the Phoenician alphabet, and in turn became the parent alphabet of the Latin, Cyrillic, and several other alphabets. The earliest Greek literary works are the Homeric epics, variously dated from the 8th to the 6th century BC. Notable scientific and mathematical works include Euclid's Elements, Ptolemy's Almagest, and others. The New Testament was originally written in Koine Greek.

Greek demonstrates several linguistic features that are shared with other Balkan languages, such as Albanian, Bulgarian and Eastern Romance languages (see Balkan sprachbund), and has absorbed many foreign words, primarily of Western European and Turkish origin. Because of the movements of Philhellenism and the Diafotismos in the 19th century, which emphasized the modern Greeks' ancient heritage, these foreign influences were excluded from official use via the creation of Katharevousa, a somewhat artificial form of Greek purged of all foreign influence and words, as the official language of the Greek state. In 1976, however, the Hellenic Parliament voted to make the spoken Dimotiki the official language, making Katharevousa obsolete.

Modern Greek has, in addition to Standard Modern Greek or Dimotiki, a wide variety of dialects of varying levels of mutual intelligibility, including Cypriot, Pontic, Cappadocian, Griko and Tsakonian (the only surviving representative of ancient Doric Greek). Yevanic is the language of the Romaniotes, and survives in small communities in Greece, New York and Israel. In addition to Greek, many Greek citizens in Greece and the diaspora are bilingual in other languages such as English, Arvanitika/Albanian, Aromanian, Megleno-Romanian, Macedonian Slavic, Russian and Turkish.

=== Religion ===
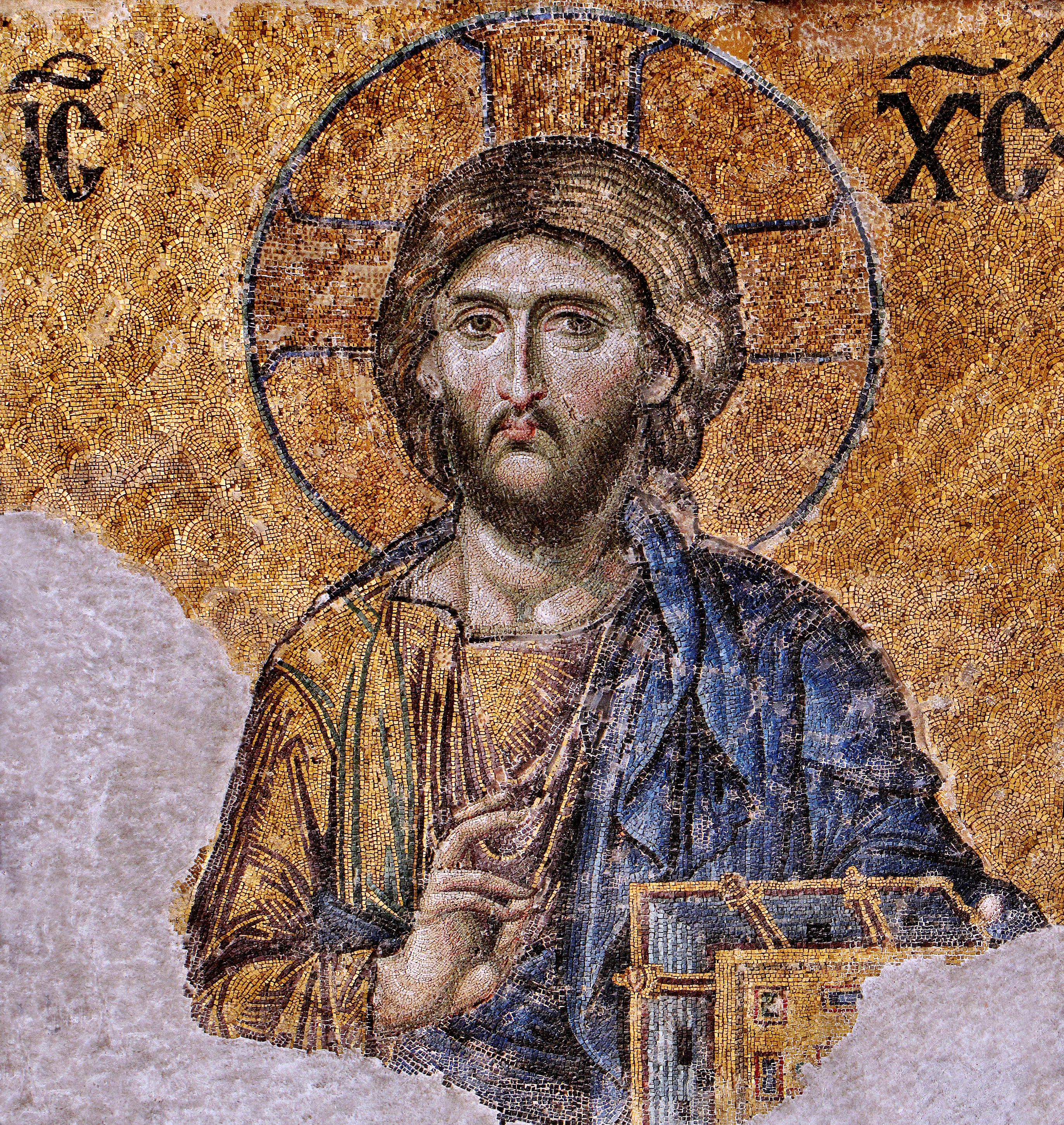
Christ Pantocrator mosaic in Hagia Sophia, Istanbul

Most Greeks are Christians, belonging to the Greek Orthodox Church. During the first centuries after Jesus Christ, the New Testament was originally written in Koine Greek, which remains the liturgical language of the Greek Orthodox Church, and most of the early Christians and Church Fathers were Greek-speaking. There are small groups of ethnic Greeks adhering to other Christian denominations like Latin and Greek Byzantine Catholics, Greek Evangelicals, Pentecostals, Mormons, and groups adhering to other religions including Romaniot and Sephardic Jews, Greek Muslims and Jehovah's Witnesses. About 2,000 Greeks are members of Hellenic Polytheistic Reconstructionism congregations.

Greek-speaking Muslims live mainly outside Greece in the contemporary era. There are both Christian and Muslim Greek-speaking communities in Lebanon and Syria, while in the Pontus region of Turkey there is a large community of indeterminate size who were spared from the population exchange because of their religious affiliation.

=== Arts ===
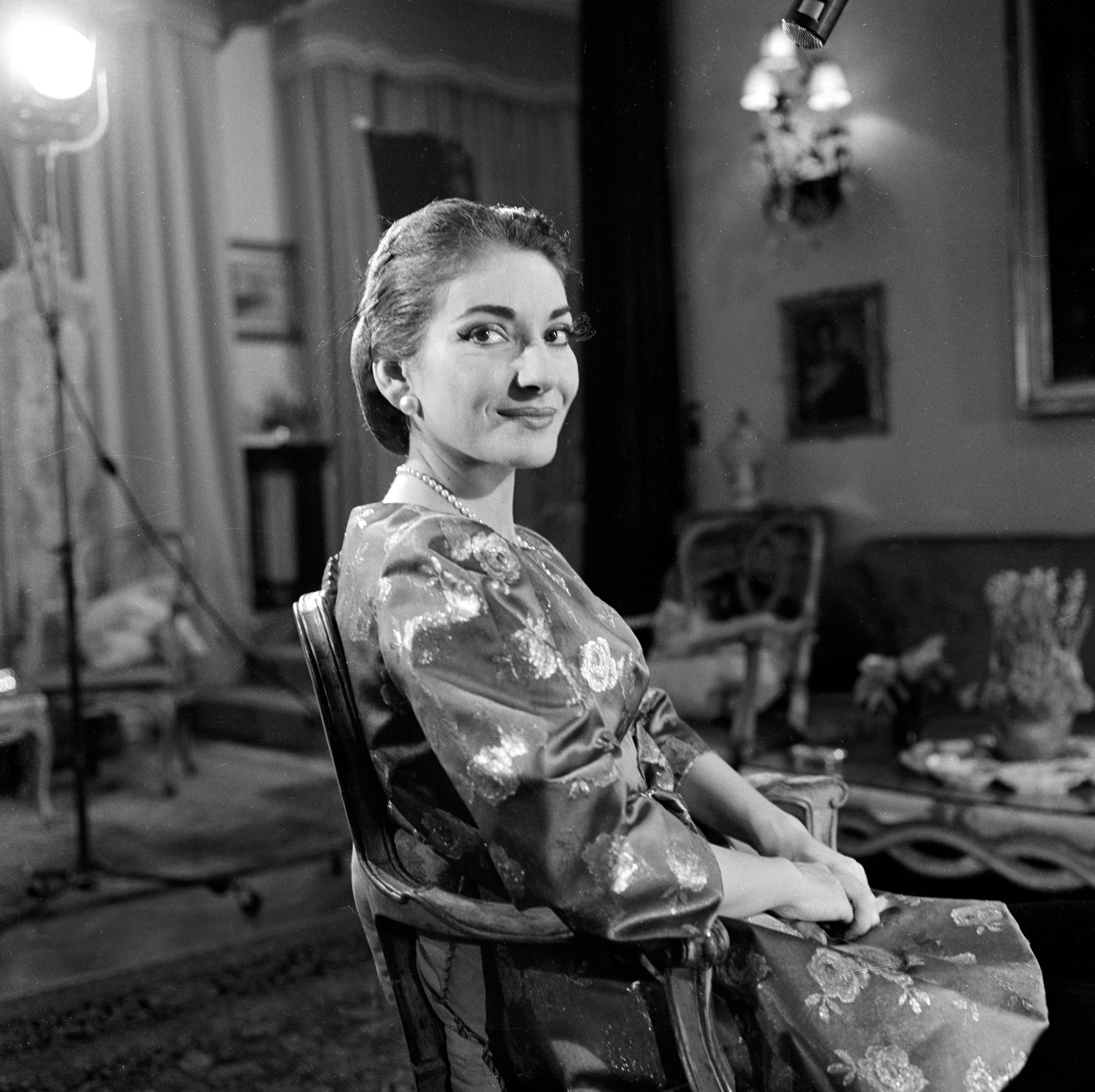
Renowned Greek soprano Maria Callas

Greek art has a long and varied history. Greeks have contributed to the visual, literary and performing arts. In the West, classical Greek art was influential in shaping the Roman and later the modern Western artistic heritage. Following the Renaissance in Europe, the humanist aesthetic and the high technical standards of Greek art inspired generations of European artists. Well into the 19th century, the classical tradition derived from Greece played an important role in the art of the Western world. In the East, Alexander the Great's conquests initiated several centuries of exchange between Greek, Central Asian and Indian cultures, resulting in Indo-Greek and Greco-Buddhist art, whose influence reached as far as Japan.

Byzantine Greek art, which grew from the Hellenistic classical art and adapted the pagan motifs in the service of Christianity, provided a stimulus to the art of many nations. Its influences can be traced from Venice in the West to Kazakhstan in the East. In turn, Greek art was influenced by eastern civilizations (i.e. Egypt, Persia, etc.) during various periods of its history.

Notable modern Greek artists include:

- the painters Dominikos Theotokopoulos (El Greco), Nikolaos Gyzis, Konstantinos Volanakis, Périclès Pantazis, and Constantine Andreou; sculptors such as Yannoulis Chalepas;
- composers such as Mikis Theodorakis, Spyridon Samaras, Iannis Xenakis, Yanni and Vangelis;
- singers such as Maria Callas, Giorgos Dalaras, Nana Mouskouri, Vicky Leandros and Demis Roussos;
- poets such as Dionysios Solomos, Angelos Sikelianos, Andreas Embirikos, Constantine P. Cavafy and Nobel laureates Giorgos Seferis and Odysseas Elytis;
- the novelists Alexandros Papadiamantis, Emmanuel Rhoides, Ion Dragoumis, Nikos Kazantzakis, Penelope Delta, Stratis Myrivilis, Vassilis Vassilikos and Petros Markaris,
- playwrights include the Cretan Renaissance poets Georgios Chortatzis and Vincenzos Cornaros, and also Gregorios Xenopoulos and Iakovos Kambanellis.

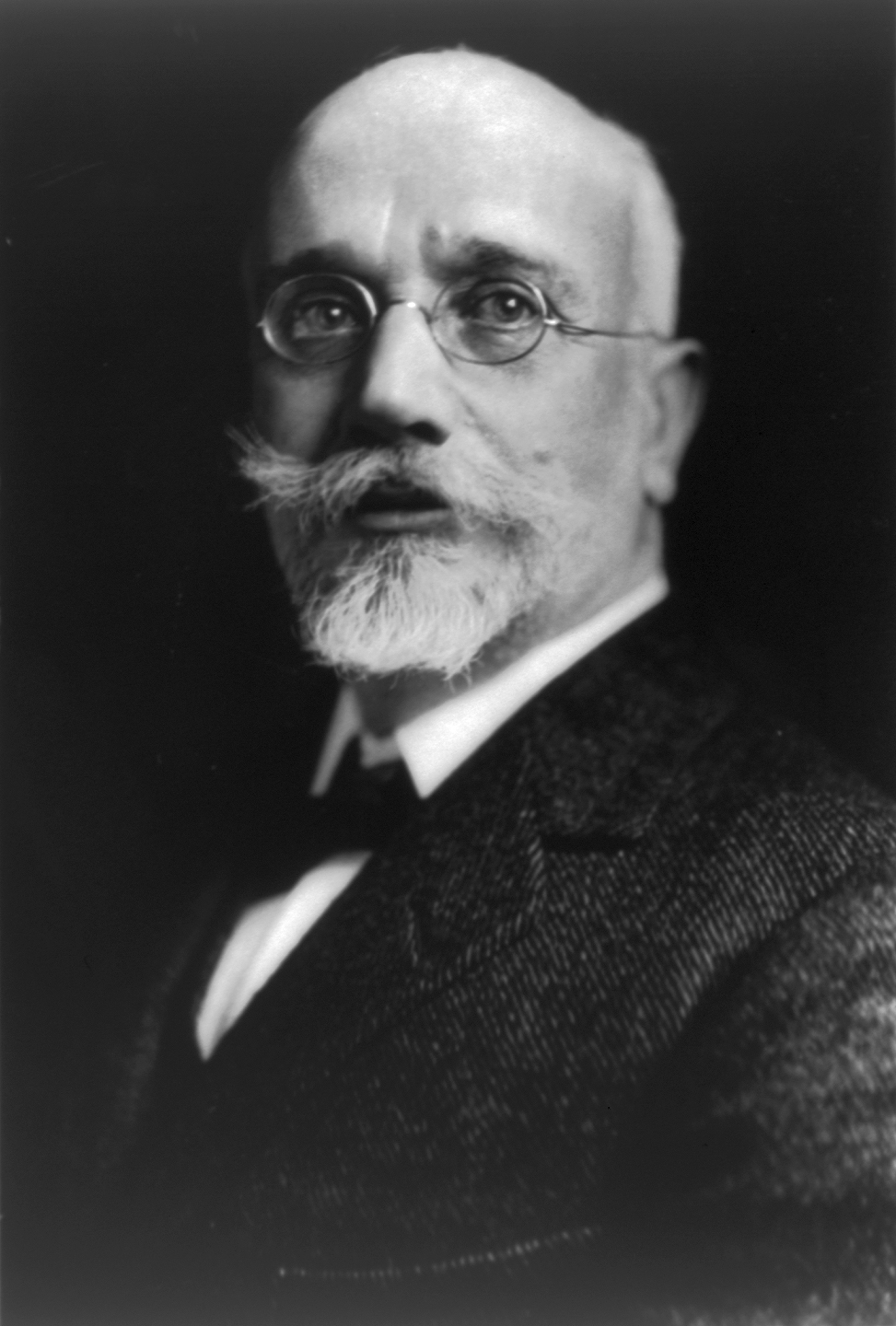
Eleftherios Venizelos was the leading political figure of 20th century Greece.

Notable cinema or theatre actors include Marika Kotopouli, Melina Mercouri, Ellie Lambeti, Academy Award winner Katina Paxinou, Alexis Minotis, Dimitris Horn, Thanasis Veggos, Manos Katrakis and Irene Papas. Alekos Sakellarios, Karolos Koun, Vasilis Georgiadis, Kostas Gavras, Michael Cacoyannis, Giannis Dalianidis, Nikos Koundouros and Theo Angelopoulos are among the most important directors.

Among the most significant modern-era architects are Stamatios Kleanthis, Lysandros Kaftanzoglou, Anastasios Metaxas, Panagis Kalkos, Anastasios Orlandos, the naturalized Greek Ernst Ziller, Dimitris Pikionis and urban planners Stamatis Voulgaris and George Candilis.

=== Science ===
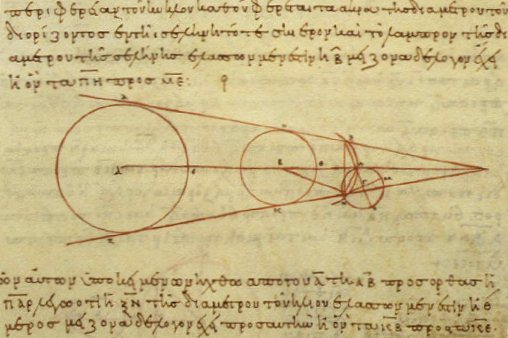
Aristarchus of Samos was the first known individual to propose a heliocentric system, in the 3rd century BC.

The Greeks of the Classical and Hellenistic eras made seminal contributions to science and philosophy, laying the foundations of several western scientific traditions, such as astronomy, geography, historiography, mathematics, medicine, philosophy and political science. The scholarly tradition of the Greek academies was maintained during Roman times with several academic institutions in Constantinople, Antioch, Alexandria and other centers of Greek learning, while Byzantine science was essentially a continuation of classical science. Greeks have a long tradition of valuing and investing in paideia (education). Paideia was one of the highest societal values in the Greek and Hellenistic world while the first European institution described as a university was founded in 5th century Constantinople and operated in various incarnations until the city's fall to the Ottomans in 1453. The University of Constantinople was Christian Europe's first secular institution of higher learning since no theological subjects were taught, and considering the original meaning of the word university as a corporation of students, the world's first university as well.

As of 2007, Greece had the eighth highest percentage of tertiary enrollment in the world (with the percentages for female students being higher than for male) while Greeks of the Diaspora are equally active in the field of education. Hundreds of thousands of Greek students attend western universities every year while the faculty lists of leading Western universities contain a striking number of Greek names. Notable Greek scientists of modern times include: physician Georgios Papanicolaou (pioneer in cytopathology, inventor of the Pap test); mathematician Constantin Carathéodory (acclaimed contributor to real and complex analysis and the calculus of variations); archaeologists Manolis Andronikos (unearthed the tomb of Philip II), Valerios Stais (recognised the Antikythera mechanism), Spyridon Marinatos (specialised in Mycenaean sites) and Ioannis Svoronos; chemists Leonidas Zervas (of Bergmann-Zervas synthesis and Z-group discovery fame), K. C. Nicolaou (first total synthesis of taxol) and Panayotis Katsoyannis (first chemical synthesis of insulin); computer scientists Michael Dertouzos and Nicholas Negroponte (known for their early work with the World Wide Web), John Argyris (co-creator of the FEM), Joseph Sifakis (2007 Turing Award), Christos Papadimitriou (2002 Knuth Prize) and Mihalis Yannakakis (2005 Knuth Prize); physicist-mathematician Demetrios Christodoulou (renowned for work on Minkowski spacetime) and physicists Achilles Papapetrou (known for solutions of general relativity), Dimitri Nanopoulos (extensive work on particle physics and cosmology), and John Iliopoulos (2007 Dirac Prize for work on the charm quark); astronomer Eugenios Antoniadis; biologist Fotis Kafatos (contributor to cDNA cloning technology); botanist Theodoros Orphanides; economist Xenophon Zolotas (held various senior posts in international organisations such as the IMF); Indologist Dimitrios Galanos; linguist Yiannis Psycharis (promoter of Demotic Greek); historians Constantine Paparrigopoulos (founder of modern Greek historiography) and Helene Glykatzi Ahrweiler (excelled in Byzantine studies); and political scientists Nicos Poulantzas (a leading Structural Marxist) and Cornelius Castoriadis (philosopher of history and ontologist, social critic, economist, psychoanalyst).

Significant engineers and automobile designers include Nikolas Tombazis, Alec Issigonis and Andreas Zapatinas.

=== Symbols ===
The national flag of Greece is commonly used as a symbol for Greeks worldwide.

The flag of the Greek Orthodox Church is based on the coat of arms of the Palaiologoi, the last dynasty of the Byzantine Empire.

The most widely used symbol is the flag of Greece, which features nine equal horizontal stripes of blue alternating with white representing the nine syllables of the Greek national motto Eleftheria i Thanatos (Freedom or Death), which was the motto of the Greek War of Independence. The blue square in the upper hoist-side corner bears a white cross, which represents Greek Orthodoxy. The Greek flag is widely used by the Greek Cypriots, although Cyprus has officially adopted a neutral flag to ease ethnic tensions with the Turkish Cypriot minority (see flag of Cyprus).

The pre-1978 (and first) flag of Greece, which features a Greek cross (crux immissa quadrata) on a blue background, is widely used as an alternative to the official flag, and they are often flown together. The national emblem of Greece features a blue escutcheon with a white cross surrounded by two laurel branches. A common design involves the current flag of Greece and the pre-1978 flag of Greece with crossed flagpoles and the national emblem placed in front.

Another highly recognizable and popular Greek symbol is the double-headed eagle, the imperial emblem of the last dynasty of the Eastern Roman Empire and a common symbol in Asia Minor and, later, Eastern Europe. It is not part of the modern Greek flag or coat-of-arms, although it is officially the insignia of the Greek Army and the flag of the Church of Greece. It had been incorporated in the Greek coat of arms between 1925 and 1926.

=== Politics ===
Classical Athens is considered the birthplace of Democracy. The term appeared in the 5th century BC to denote the political systems then existing in Greek city-states, notably Athens, to mean "rule of the people", in contrast to aristocracy (ἀριστοκρατία, aristokratía), meaning "rule by an excellent elite", and to oligarchy. While theoretically these definitions are in opposition, in practice the distinction has been blurred historically. Led by Cleisthenes, Athenians established what is generally held as the first democracy in 508–507 BC, which took gradually the form of a direct democracy. The democratic form of government declined during the Hellenistic and Roman eras, only to be revived as an interest in Western Europe during the early modern period.

The European enlightenment and the democratic, liberal and nationalistic ideas of the French Revolution was a crucial factor to the outbreak of the Greek War of Independence and the establishment of the modern Greek state.

Notable modern Greek politicians include Ioannis Kapodistrias, founder of the First Hellenic Republic, reformist Charilaos Trikoupis, Eleftherios Venizelos, who marked the shape of modern Greece, social democrats Georgios Papandreou and Alexandros Papanastasiou, Konstantinos Karamanlis, founder of the Third Hellenic Republic, and socialist Andreas Papandreou.

=== Surnames and personal names ===
Greek surnames began to appear in the 9th and 10th century, at first among ruling families, eventually supplanting the ancient tradition of using the father's name as disambiguator. Nevertheless, Greek surnames are most commonly patronymics, such those ending in the suffix -opoulos or -ides, while others derive from trade professions, physical characteristics, or a location such as a town, village, or monastery. Commonly, Greek male surnames end in -s, which is the common ending for Greek masculine proper nouns in the nominative case. Occasionally (especially in Cyprus), some surnames end in -ou, indicating the genitive case of a patronymic name. Many surnames end in suffixes that are associated with a particular region, such as -akis (Crete), -eas or -akos (Mani Peninsula), -atos (island of Cephalonia), -ellis (island of Lesbos) and so forth. In addition to a Greek origin, some surnames have Turkish or Latin/Italian origin, especially among Greeks from Asia Minor and the Ionian Islands, respectively. Female surnames end in a vowel and are usually the genitive form of the corresponding males surname, although this usage is not followed in the diaspora, where the male version of the surname is generally used.

With respect to personal names, the two main influences are Christianity and classical Hellenism; ancient Greek nomenclatures were never forgotten but have become more widely bestowed from the 18th century onwards. As in antiquity, children are customarily named after their grandparents, with the first born male child named after the paternal grandfather, the second male child after the maternal grandfather, and similarly for female children. Personal names are often familiarized by a diminutive suffix, such as -akis for male names and -itsa or -oula for female names. Greeks generally do not use middle names, instead using the genitive of the father's first name as a middle name. This usage has been passed on to the Russians and other East Slavs (otchestvo).

=== Sea: exploring and commerce ===
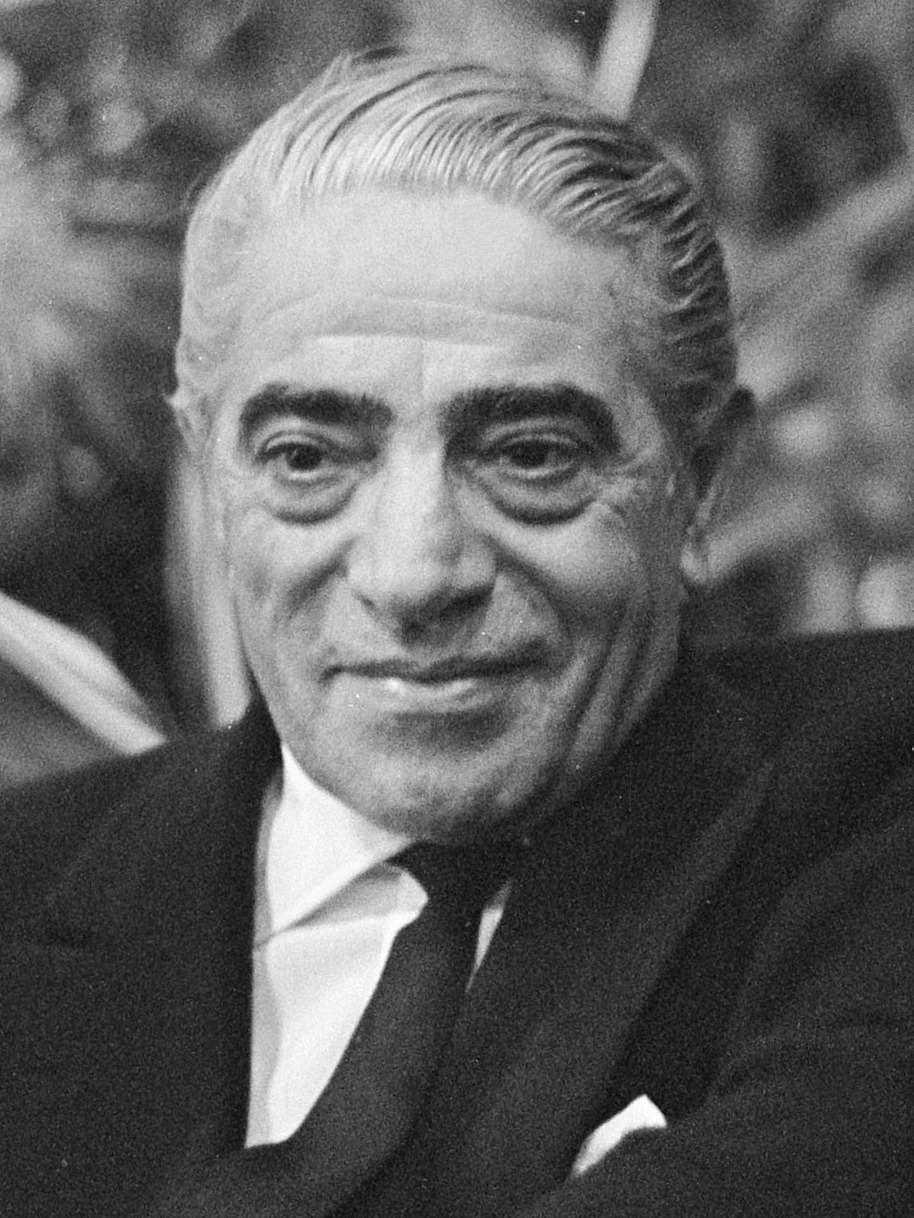
Aristotle Onassis, the best-known Greek shipping magnate worldwide

The traditional Greek homelands have been the Greek peninsula and the Aegean Sea, Southern Italy (the so called "Magna Graecia"), the Black Sea, the Ionian coasts of Asia Minor and the islands of Cyprus and Sicily. In Plato's Phaidon, Socrates remarks, "we (Greeks) live around a sea like frogs around a pond" when describing to his friends the Greek cities of the Aegean. This image is attested by the map of the Old Greek Diaspora, which corresponded to the Greek world until the creation of the Greek state in 1832. The sea and trade were natural outlets for Greeks since the Greek peninsula is mostly rocky and does not offer good prospects for agriculture.

Notable Greek seafarers include people such as Pytheas of Massalia who sailed to Great Britain, Euthymenes who sailed to Africa, Scylax of Caryanda who sailed to India, the navarch of Alexander the Great Nearchus, Megasthenes, explorer of India, later the 6th century merchant and monk Cosmas Indicopleustes (Cosmas who sailed to India), and the explorer of the Northwestern Passage Ioannis Fokas also known as Juan de Fuca. In later times, the Byzantine Greeks plied the sea-lanes of the Mediterranean and controlled trade until an embargo imposed by the Byzantine emperor on trade with the Caliphate opened the door for the later Italian pre-eminence in trade. Panayotis Potagos was another explorer of modern times who was the first to reach Mbomu and Uele River from the north.

The Greek shipping tradition recovered during the late Ottoman rule (especially after the Treaty of Küçük Kaynarca and during the Napoleonic Wars), when a substantial merchant middle class developed, which played an important part in the Greek War of Independence. Today, Greek shipping continues to prosper to the extent that Greece has one of the largest merchant fleets in the world, while many more ships under Greek ownership fly flags of convenience. The most notable shipping magnate of the 20th century was Aristotle Onassis, others being Yiannis Latsis, Stavros G. Livanos, and Stavros Niarchos.

== Genetics ==
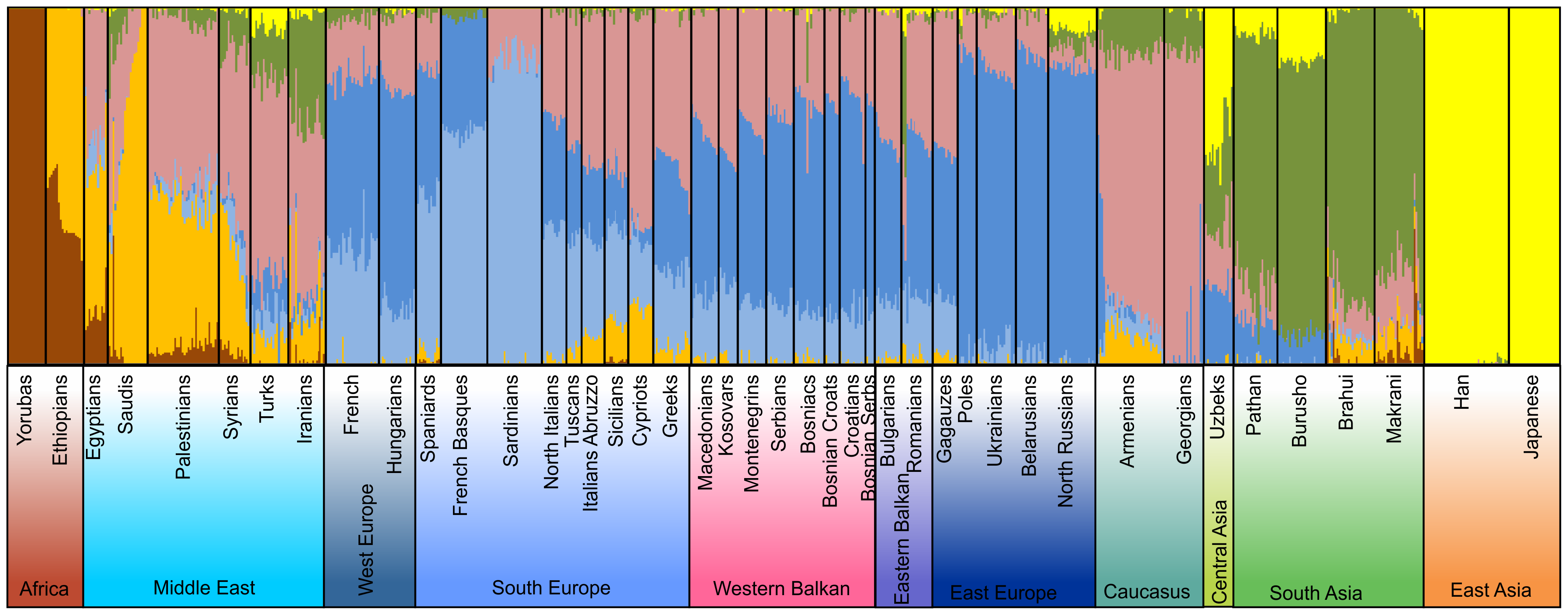
Admixture analysis of autosomal SNPs of the Balkan region in a global context on the resolution level of 7 assumed ancestral populations: African (brown), South/West European (light blue), Asian (yellow), Middle Eastern (orange), South Asian (green), North/East European (dark blue) and Caucasian/Anatolian component (beige).

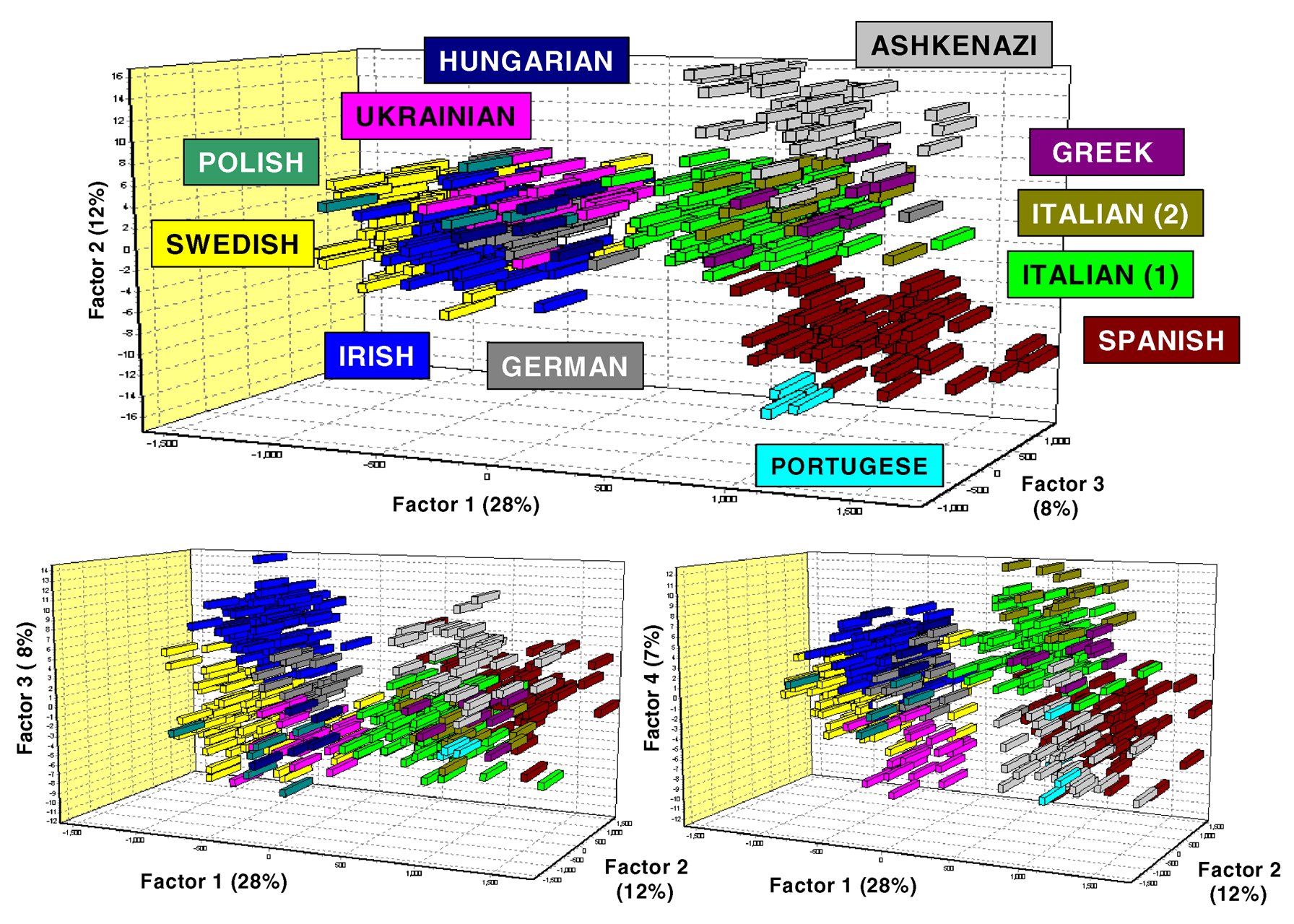
Factor correspondence analysis comparing different individuals from European ancestry groups

In their archaeogenetic study, Lazaridis et al. (2017) found that Minoans and Mycenaean Greeks were genetically highly similar, but not identical; modern Greeks resembled the Mycenaeans, but with some additional dilution of the early Neolithic ancestry. The results of the study support the idea of genetic continuity between these civilizations and modern Greeks, but not isolation in the history of populations of the Aegean, before and after the time of its earliest civilizations. Furthermore, proposed migrations by Egyptian or Phoenician colonists was not discernible in their data, thus "rejecting the hypothesis that the cultures of the Aegean were seeded by migrants from the old civilizations of these regions." The F_{ST} between the sampled Bronze Age populations and present-day West Eurasians was estimated, finding that Mycenaean Greeks and Minoans were least differentiated from the populations of modern Greece, Cyprus, Albania, and Italy. In a subsequent study, Lazaridis et al. (2022) concluded that around ~58.4–65.8% of the ancestry of the Mycenaeans came from Anatolian Neolithic Farmers (ANF), while the remainder mainly came from ancient populations related to the Caucasus Hunter-Gatherers (CHG) (~20.1–22.7%) and the Pre-Pottery Neolithic (PPN) culture in the Levant (~7–14%). The Mycenaeans had also inherited ~3.3–5.5% ancestry from a source related to the Eastern European Hunter-Gatherers (EHG), introduced via a proximal source related to the inhabitants of the Eurasian steppe who are hypothesized to be the Proto-Indo-Europeans, and ~0.9–2.3% from the Iron Gates Hunter-Gatherers in the Balkans. Mycenaean elites were genetically the same as Mycenaean commoners in terms of their steppe ancestry, while some Mycenaeans lacked it altogether.

A genetic study by Clemente et al. (2021) found that in the Early Bronze Age, the populations of the Minoan, Helladic, and Cycladic civilizations in the Aegean, were genetically homogeneous. In contrast, the Aegean population during the Middle Bronze Age was more differentiated; probably due to gene flow from a Yamnaya-related population from the Pontic–Caspian steppe. This is corroborated by sequenced genomes of Middle Bronze Age individuals from northern Greece, who had a much higher proportion of steppe-related ancestry; the timing of this gene flow was estimated at ~2,300 BCE, and is consistent with the dominant linguistic theories explaining the emergence of the Proto-Greek language. Present-day Greeks share ~90% of their ancestry with them, suggesting continuity between the two time periods. In the case of Mycenaean Greeks however, their steppe-related ancestry was diluted. The ancestry of the Mycenaeans could be explained via a 2-way admixture model of such MBA individuals in northern Greece, and either an EBA Aegean or MBA Minoan population; the difference between the two time periods could be explained by the general decline of the Mycenaean civilization.

Genetic studies using multiple autosomal, Y-DNA, and mtDNA markers, show that Greeks share similar backgrounds as the rest of the Europeans and especially Southern Europeans (Italians and Balkan populations such as Albanians, Slavic Macedonians and Romanians). A study in 2008 showed that Greeks are genetically closest to Italians and Romanians and another 2008 study showed that they are close to Italians, Albanians, Romanians and southern Balkan Slavs such as Slavic Macedonians and Bulgarians. A 2003 study showed that Greeks cluster with other South European (mainly Italians) and North-European populations and are close to the Basques, and F_{ST} distances showed that they group with other European and Mediterranean populations, especially with Italians (−0.0001) and Tuscans (0.0005). A study in 2008 showed that Greek regional samples from the mainland cluster with those from the Balkans, principally Albanians while Cretan Greeks cluster with the central Mediterranean and Eastern Mediterranean samples. Studies using mitochondrial DNA gene markers (mtDNA) showed that Greeks group with other Mediterranean European populations and principal component analysis (PCA) confirmed the low genetic distance between Greeks and Italians and also revealed a cline of genes with highest frequencies in the Balkans and Southern Italy, spreading to lowest levels in Britain and the Basque country, which Cavalli-Sforza (1993) associates with "the Greek expansion, which reached its peak in historical times around 1000 and 500 BC but which certainly began earlier". Greeks also have a degree of Eastern-European-related ancestry which is observed in all Balkan peoples; it was acquired after 700 CE, coinciding with the arrival of Slavic-speaking peoples in the Balkans, but the proportion of this ancestry varies considerably between different studies and subregions. A 2019 study showed that Cretans share high IBD with Western (CEU), Central (German and Polish), Northern (CEU, Scandinavian) and Eastern Europeans (Ukrainian, Russian), similar to mainland Greeks who share high IBD with Eastern Europeans. This reflects settlement patterns in Crete, driven by Myceneans and Dorians, Goths and Slavs. Peoples like Andalusians, Near Eastern Arabs and Venetians left a minimal genetic impact on Cretans. But a PCA analysis shows that Cretans overlap with Peloponneseans, Sicilians and Ashkenazi Jews. A 2022 study discovered high genetic affinities between present-day southeastern Peloponnesian populations and Apulians, Calabrians and southeastern Sicilians, which are "all characterised by a cluster composition different from those displayed by other Greek groups", due to low influence from inland populations such as Slavic-related people and/or genetic drift in Tsakones and Maniots. Individuals from western Sicily additionally show similarities with peoples from the western part of the Peloponnese. A 2023 study states that early Cretan farmers shared the same ancestry as other Neolithic Aegeans but received 'eastern' gene flow of Anatolian origin at the end of the Neolithic Age. From the 17th to 12th centuries BCE, genetic signatures of Central and East European ancestry gradually increased in Crete, indicative of mainland Greek influence.

== Physical appearance ==
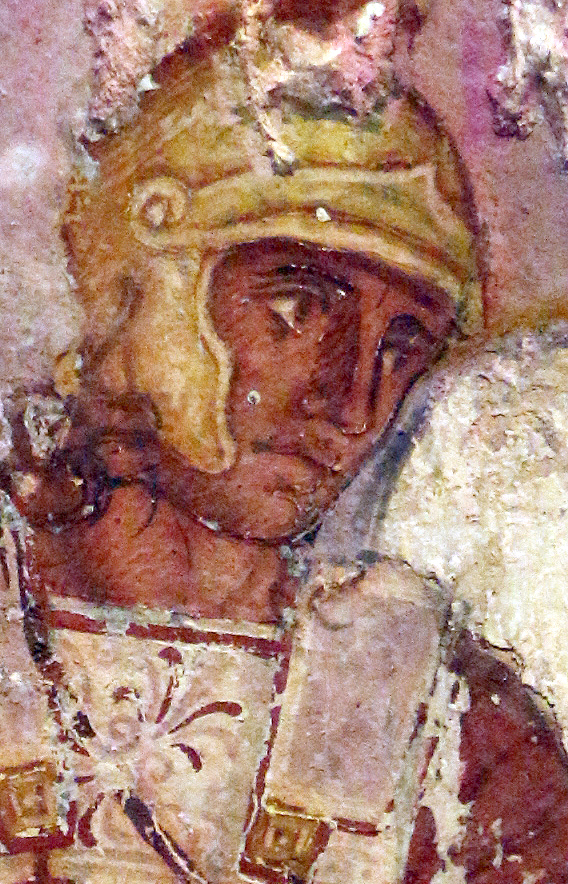
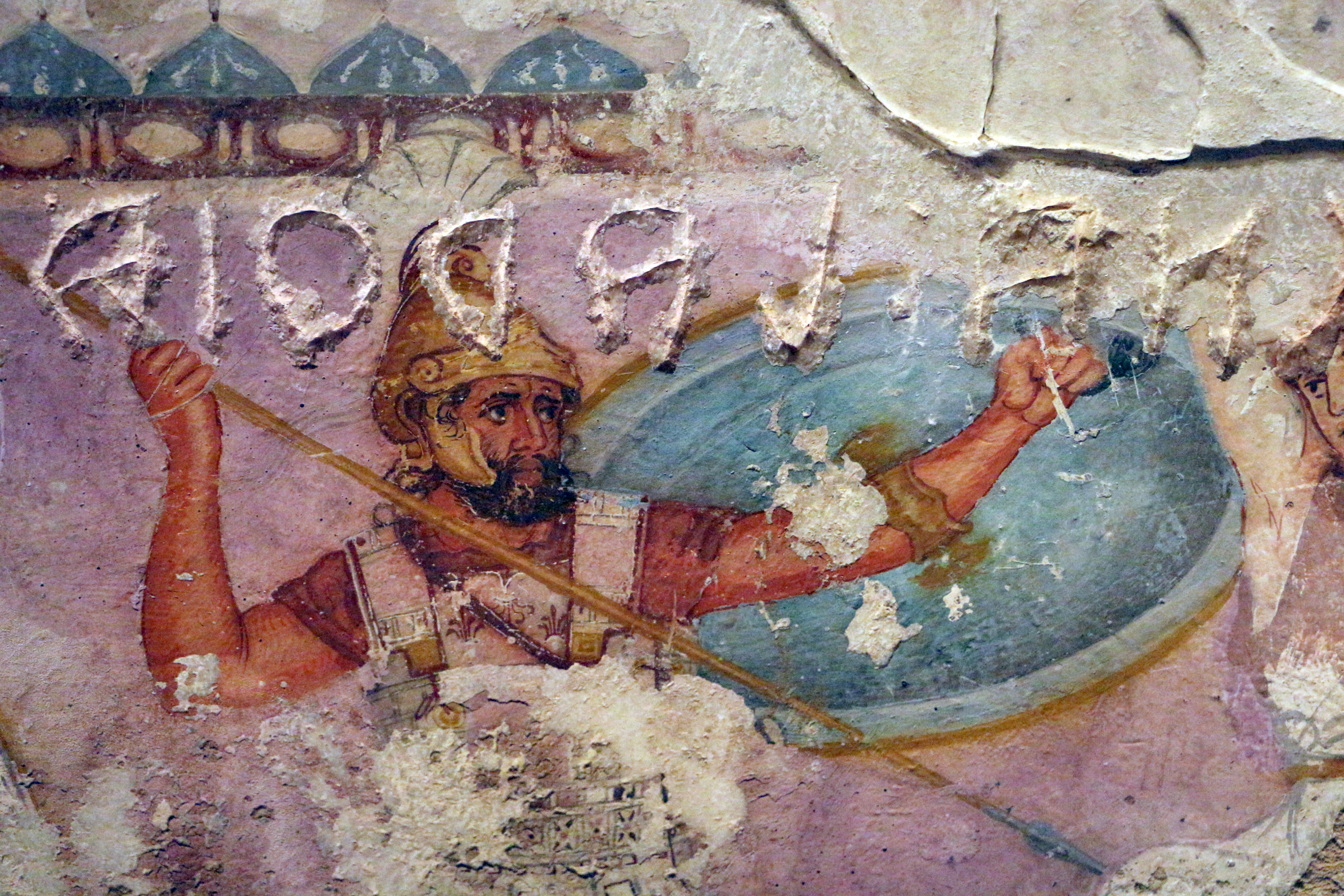
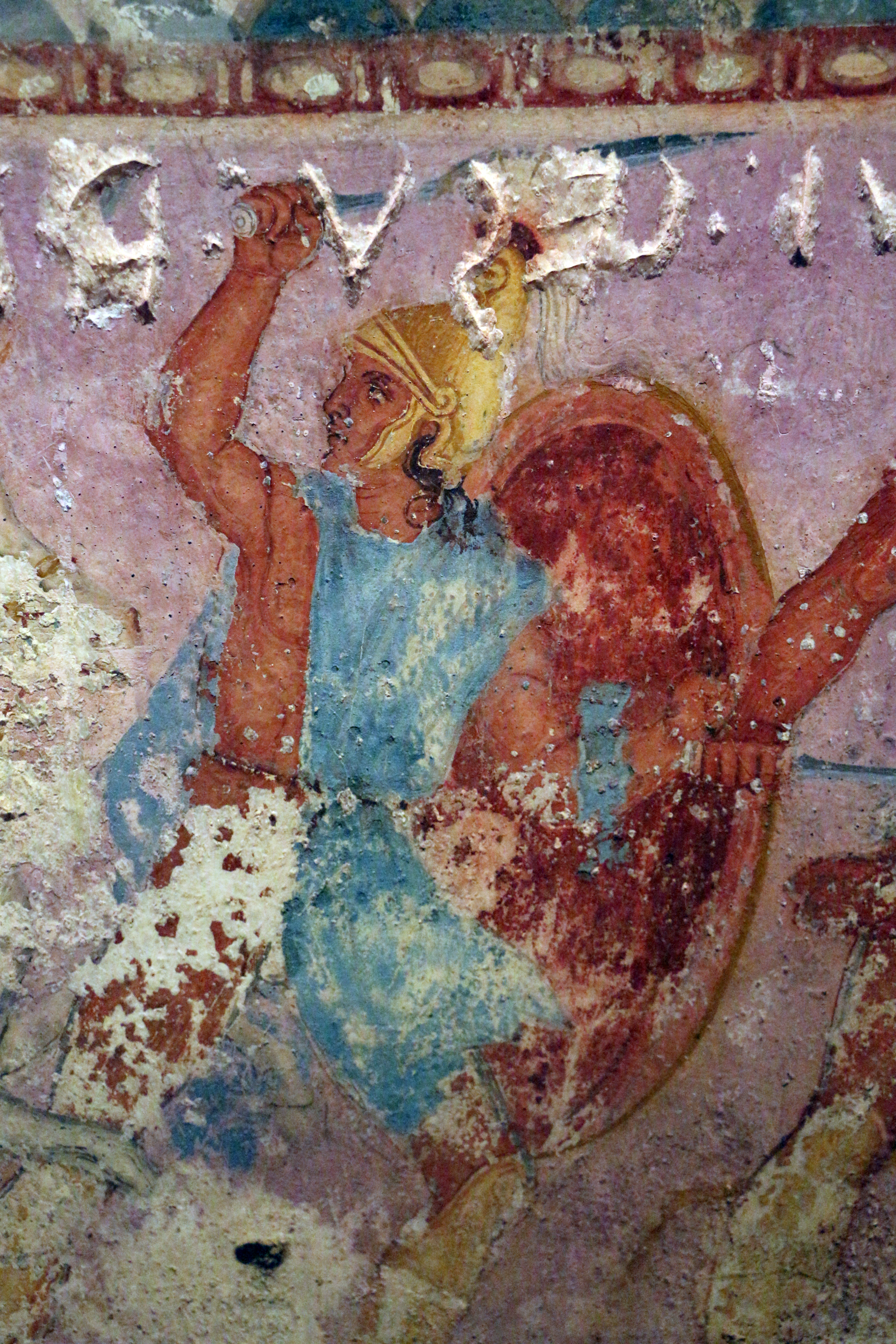
Greek warriors, details from painted sarcophagus found in Italy, 350–325 BC

A study from 2013 for prediction of hair and eye colour from DNA of the Greek people showed that the self-reported phenotype frequencies according to hair and eye colour categories was as follows: 119 individuals – hair colour, 11 blond, 45 dark blond/light brown, 49 dark brown, 3 brown red/auburn and 11 had black hair; eye colour, 13 with blue, 15 with intermediate (green, heterochromia) and 91 had brown eye colour.

Another study from 2012 included 150 dental school students from the University of Athens, and the results of the study showed that light hair colour (blonde/light ash brown) was predominant in 10.7% of the students. 36% had medium hair colour (light brown/medium darkest brown), 32% had darkest brown and 21% black (15.3 off black, 6% midnight black). In conclusion, the hair colour of young Greeks are mostly brown, ranging from light to dark brown with significant minorities having black and blonde hair. The same study also showed that the eye colour of the students was 14.6% blue/green, 28% medium (light brown) and 57.4% dark brown.

A 2017 study found that Bronze Age Aegean populations had mostly dark hair (brown to black) and eyes. The genetic phenotype predictions matched the visual representations made by the Greeks of themselves, suggesting that art of this period reproduced phenotypes naturalistically.

== Timeline ==
The history of the Greek people is closely associated with the history of Greece, Cyprus, Southern Italy, Constantinople, Asia Minor and the Black Sea. During the Ottoman rule of Greece, a number of Greek enclaves around the Mediterranean were cut off from the core, notably in Southern Italy, the Caucasus, Syria and Egypt. By the early 20th century, over half of the overall Greek-speaking population was settled in Asia Minor (now Turkey), while later that century a huge wave of migration to the United States, Australia, Canada and elsewhere created the modern Greek diaspora.

Time	Events
c. 3rd millennium BC	Proto-Greek tribes from around the Southern Balkans/Aegean are generally thought to have arrived in the Greek mainland.
16th century BC	Emergence of the Achaeans and formation of the Mycenaean civilization, which produced the earliest textual evidence of the Greek language.
15th century BC	Knossos ruled by a Mycenaean elite, who formed a hybrid Mycenaean-Minoan culture on Crete.
14th century BC	Mycenaean involvement in Asia Minor begins.
11th century BC	The Mycenaean civilization ends with destructions of palaces and internal displacements. The Greek Dark Ages begin. Dorians move into peninsular Greece.
9th century BC	Major colonization of Asia Minor and Cyprus by the Greek tribes.
8th century BC	First major colonies established in Sicily and Southern Italy. The first Pan-Hellenic festival, the Olympic games, is held in 776 BC. The emergence of Pan-Hellenism marks the ethnogenesis of the Greek nation.
6th century BC	Colonies established across the Mediterranean Sea and the Black Sea.
5th century BC	Defeat of the Persians and emergence of the Delian League in Ionia, the Black Sea and Aegean perimeter culminates in Athenian Empire and the Classical Age of Greece; ends with Athens defeat by Sparta at the close of the Peloponnesian War
4th century BC	Rise of Theban power and defeat of the Spartans; Rise of Macedon; Campaign of Alexander the Great; Greek colonies established in newly founded cities of Ptolemaic Egypt and Asia.
2nd century BC	Conquest of Greece by the Roman Empire. Migrations of Greeks to Rome.
4th century AD	Eastern Roman Empire. Migrations of Greeks throughout the Empire, mainly towards Constantinople.
7th century	Slavic conquest of several parts of Greece, Greek migrations to Southern Italy, Roman emperors capture main Slavic bodies and transfer them to Cappadocia. The Bosporus is re-populated by Macedonian and Cypriot Greeks.
8th century	Roman dissolution of surviving Slavic settlements in Greece and full recovery of the Greek peninsula.
9th century	Retro-migrations of Greeks from all parts of the Empire (mainly from Southern Italy and Sicily) into parts of Greece that were depopulated by the Slavic Invasions (mainly western Peloponnesus and Thessaly).
13th century	Roman Empire dissolves, Constantinople taken by the Fourth Crusade; becoming the capital of the Latin Empire. Liberated after a long struggle by the Empire of Nicaea, but fragments remain separated. Migrations between Asia Minor, Constantinople and mainland Greece take place.
15th century – 19th century	Conquest of Constantinople by the Ottoman Empire. Greek diaspora into Europe begins. Ottoman settlements in Greece. Phanariot Greeks occupy high posts in Eastern European millets.

Time	Events
1830s	Creation of the modern Greek state. Emigration to the New World begins. Large-scale migrations from Constantinople and Asia Minor to Greece take place.
1913	European Ottoman lands partitioned; unorganized migrations of Greeks, Bulgarians and Turks towards their respective states.
1914–1923	Greek genocide; hundreds of thousands of Ottoman Greeks are estimated to have died during this period.
1919	Treaty of Neuilly; Greece and Bulgaria exchange populations, with some exceptions.
1922	The Destruction of Smyrna (modern-day Izmir) more than 40 thousand Greeks killed; end of significant Greek presence in Asia Minor.
1923	Treaty of Lausanne; Greece and Turkey agree to exchange populations with limited exceptions of the Greeks in Constantinople, Imbros, Tenedos and the Muslim minority of Western Thrace. 1.5 million of Asia Minor and Pontic Greeks settle in Greece, and some 450 thousands of Muslims settle in Turkey.
1940s	Hundreds of thousands of Greeks die of starvation during the Great Famine caused by the Axis occupation.
1947	Communist Romania begins evictions of the Greek community; approx. 75,000 migrate.
1948	Greek Civil War: tens of thousands of communists and their families flee to Eastern Bloc nations. Thousands settle in Tashkent.
1950s	Massive emigration of Greeks to West Germany, the United States, Australia, Canada, and other countries.
1955	Istanbul pogrom against the city's Greeks. Exodus of Greeks accelerates; fewer than 2,000 remain today.
1958	Large Greek community in Alexandria flees Nasser's Arab socialist regime in Egypt.
1960s	Republic of Cyprus created as a sovereign state under Greek, Turkish and British protection. Economic emigration continues.
1974	Turkish invasion of Cyprus. Almost all Greeks living in northern Cyprus flee to the south or the United Kingdom.
1980s	Many civil war refugees allowed to return to Greece. Retro-migration of Greeks from Germany begins.
1990s	Dissolution of the Soviet Union. Approximately 340,000 ethnic Greeks migrate from Georgia, Armenia, southern Russia, and Albania to Greece.
early 2000s	Some statistics show the beginning of a trend of reverse migration of Greeks from the United States and Australia.
2010s	Over 200,000 people, particularly young skilled individuals, emigrate to other EU states due to high unemployment (see also Greek government-debt crisis).

== See also ==
- Antiochian Greeks
- Arvanites
- Asia Minor Greeks
  - Pontic Greeks
  - Cappadocian Greeks
  - Karamanlides
- Greek Cypriots
- Caucasian Greeks
- Greek Diaspora
- Griko people
- Macedonians (Greeks)
- Maniots
- Thracian Greeks
- Greek Muslims
- Cretan Muslims
- Northern Epirotes
- Pelasgians
- Romaniotes
- Sarakatsani
- Tsakones
- Urums
- Lists
  - List of ancient Greeks
  - List of Greeks
  - List of ancient Greek alliances
  - List of Greek Americans
