= Apostolic Gospel Church of Jesus Christ =

- Classification: Pentecostal
- Founder: Donald Abernathy
- Origin: 1963; Bell Gardens, California

Apostolic Gospel Church of Jesus Christ is a church in the Oneness Pentecostalism movement that was founded in Bell Gardens, California in 1963 by Donald Abernathy.

By 1968, five congregations existed in Abernathy's church in the Los Angeles region of southern California. In 1968, Abernathy reported a series of visions whereby it was shown to him that the west coast of North America would be devastated by a massive earthquake. After one of the pastors in the church reported a confirmatory vision, the church decided to relocate. Abernathy took one congregation to Atlanta, Georgia, while others went to Kennett, Missouri, Independence, Missouri, and Murfreesboro, Tennessee.

Adherents of the Apostolic Gospel Church of Jesus Christ believe in faith healing and do not approve of the use of medicine or physicians. Members are pacifists and there is a strict dress and grooming code for men and women.

The church is led by bishops and deacons and includes in its hierarchy prophets, apostles, evangelists, teachers, and laymen.
