= International Apostolic Fellowship =

Fellowship denomination

The International Apostolic Fellowship, Inc. (IAF) is a fellowship of Apostolic ministers dedicated to re-uniting all Apostolic Christians previously divided through personal, racial, or denominational divisions. The fellowship is composed of Oneness Pentecostal ministers who have a desire to see the internal barriers of the Apostolic movement broken down.

The IAF does not regard itself as a religious denomination, but a fellowship composed of ministers from various Oneness Pentecostal organizations. Its purpose, as stated in their articles of faith, is to "allow brethren of like precious faith to fellowship, regardless of which oneness group they may or may not belong to."
