= Free Apostolic Church of Pentecost =

- Classification: Protestant
- Orientation: Pentecostal
- Region: Worldwide (mainly in Greece)
- Headquarters: Athens Central Church
- Founder: Leonidas Feggos
- Origin: 1965; Athens, Greece
- Separated from: Assemblies of God
- Merger of: Free Apostolic Church of Pentecost & Church of God of Pentecost, 1995
- Congregations: 140
- Members: 10,000

The Free Apostolic Church of Pentecost (Greek: Ελευθέρα Αποστολική Εκκλησία Πεντηκοστής) is the largest Greek Pentecostal (Protestant) church. Founded by Dr. Leonidas Feggos in 1965, it now counts over 140 churches and over 10,000 members in Greece. It also has churches and missions also in Cyprus, Albania, Bulgaria, Germany, Belgium, Slovakia, United Kingdom, U.S. (New York and Ohio), Australia and Africa.
