= List of Christian denominations =

A Christian denomination is a distinct religious body within Christianity, identified by traits such as a name, organization and doctrine. Individual bodies, however, may use alternative terms to describe themselves, such as church, convention, communion, assembly, house, union, network, or sometimes fellowship. Divisions between one denomination and another are primarily defined by authority and doctrine. Issues regarding the nature of Jesus, Trinitarianism, salvation, the authority of apostolic succession, eschatology, conciliarity, papal supremacy and papal primacy among others may separate one denomination from another. Groups of denominations, often sharing broadly similar beliefs, practices, and historical ties—can be known as "branches of Christianity" or "denominational families" (e.g. Eastern or Western Christianity and their sub-branches). These "denominational families" are often imprecisely also called denominations.

Christian denominations since the 20th century have often involved themselves in ecumenism. Ecumenism refers to efforts among Christian bodies to develop better understandings and closer relationships. It also refers to efforts toward visible unity in the Christian Church, though the terms of visible unity vary for each denomination of Christianity, as certain groups teach they are the one true church, or that they were divinely instituted for the propagation of a certain doctrine. The largest ecumenical organization in Christianity is the World Council of Churches.

The following is not a complete list, but aims to provide a comprehensible overview of the diversity among denominations of Christianity, ecumenical organizations, and Christian ideologies not necessarily represented by specific denominations. Only those Christian denominations, ideologies and organizations with Wikipedia articles will be listed in order to ensure that all entries on this list are notable and verifiable. The denominations and ecumenical organizations listed are generally ordered from ancient to contemporary Christianity.

(Not shown are ante-Nicene, nontrinitarian, and restorationist denominations.)

== Terminology and qualification ==
World Christianity by tradition in 2024 as per World Christian Database
1. Catholic (48.6%)
2. Protestant (39.8%)
3. Orthodox (11.1%)
4. Other (0.50%)

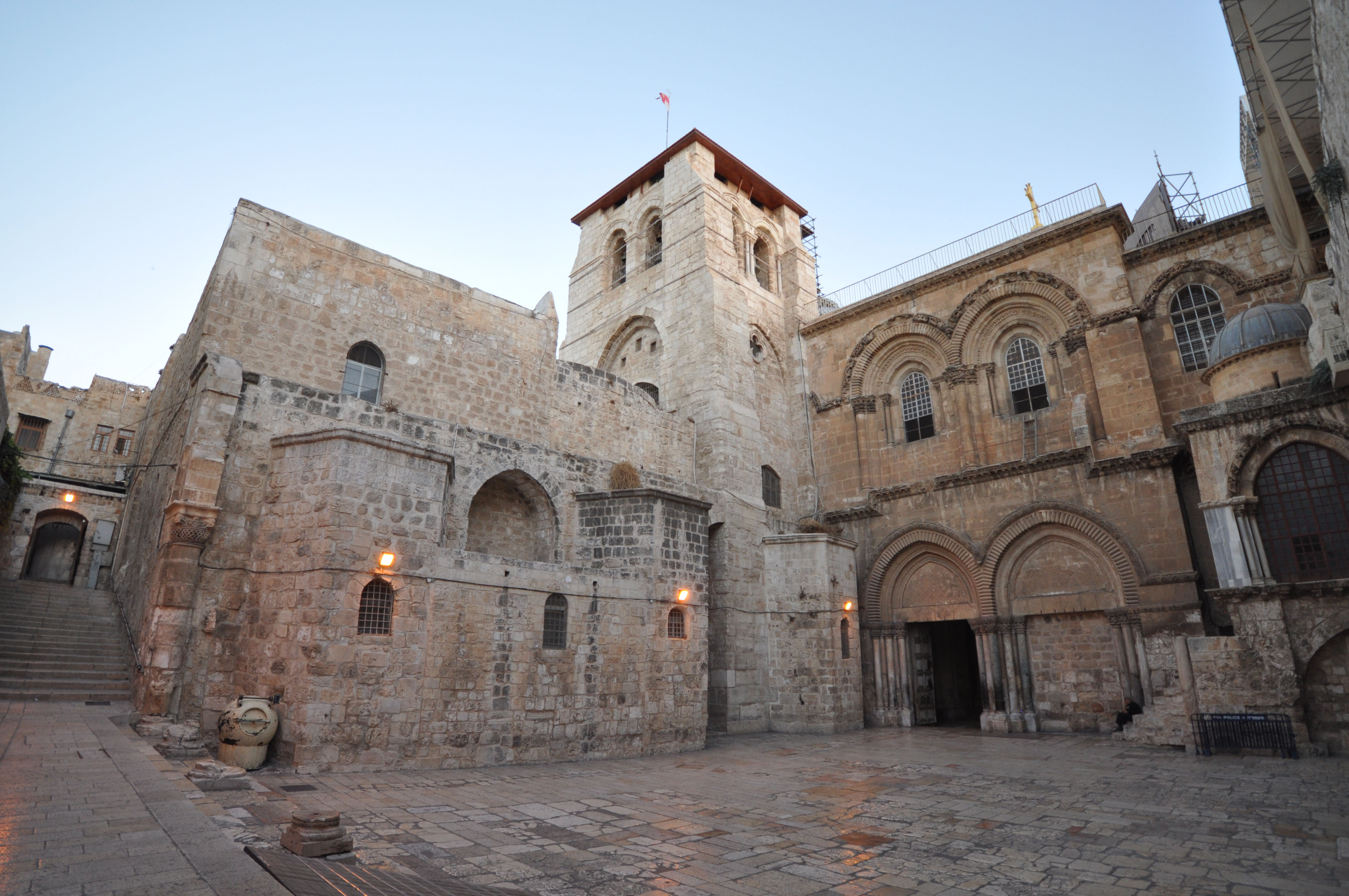
Church of the Holy Sepulchre, a center for Christian unity in Jerusalem

Christianity can be taxonomically divided into six main groups: the Church of the East, Oriental Orthodoxy, Eastern Orthodoxy, Catholicism, Protestantism, and Restorationism. Within these six main traditions are various Christian denominations (for example, the Coptic Orthodox Church is an Oriental Orthodox denomination). Protestantism includes many groups which do not share any ecclesiastical governance and have widely diverging beliefs and practices. Major Protestant branches include Adventism, Anabaptism, Anglicanism, Baptists, Lutheranism, Methodism, Moravianism, Quakerism, Pentecostalism, Plymouth Brethren, Reformed Christianity, and Waldensianism. Reformed Christianity itself includes the Continental Reformed, Presbyterian, Evangelical Anglican, Congregationalist traditions. Anabaptist Christianity itself includes the Amish, Apostolic, Bruderhof, Hutterite, Mennonite, Reformed Baptist, River Brethren, and Schwarzenau Brethren traditions.

Within the Restorationist branch of Christianity, denominations include the Stone-Campbell churches, Irvingians, Swedenborgians, Christadelphians, Latter Day Saints, Jehovah's Witnesses, La Luz del Mundo, and Iglesia ni Cristo. Among those listed, some bodies included do not consider themselves denominations, though for the purpose of academic study of religion, they are categorized as a denomination, that is, "an organized body of Christians." For example, the Catholic Church considers itself the one true church and the Holy See as pre-denominational. The Eastern Orthodox Church, and the Oriental Orthodox Churches, also considers themselves to be the original Christian church along with the Roman Catholic Church. The Lutheran churches have viewed themselves as the "main trunk of the historical Christian Tree" founded by Christ and the Apostles, holding that during the Reformation, the Church of Rome fell away. Certain denominational traditions teach that they were divinely instituted to propagate a certain doctrine or spiritual experience, for example the raising up of Methodism by God to propagate entire sanctification (the "second blessing"), or the launch of Pentecostalism to bestow a baptism with the Holy Spirit evidenced by speaking in tongues on humanity. To express further the complexity involved, the Roman Catholic and Eastern Orthodox churches were historically one and the same, as evidenced by the fact that they are the only two modern churches in existence to accept all of the first seven ecumenical councils, until differences arose, such as papal authority and dominance, the rise of the Ecumenical Patriarchate of Constantinople, the fall of the Western Roman Empire, the continuance of emperors in the Eastern Roman Empire, and the final and permanent split that occurred during the Crusades with the siege of Constantinople. This also illustrates that denominations can arise not only from religious or theological issues, but political and generational divisions as well.

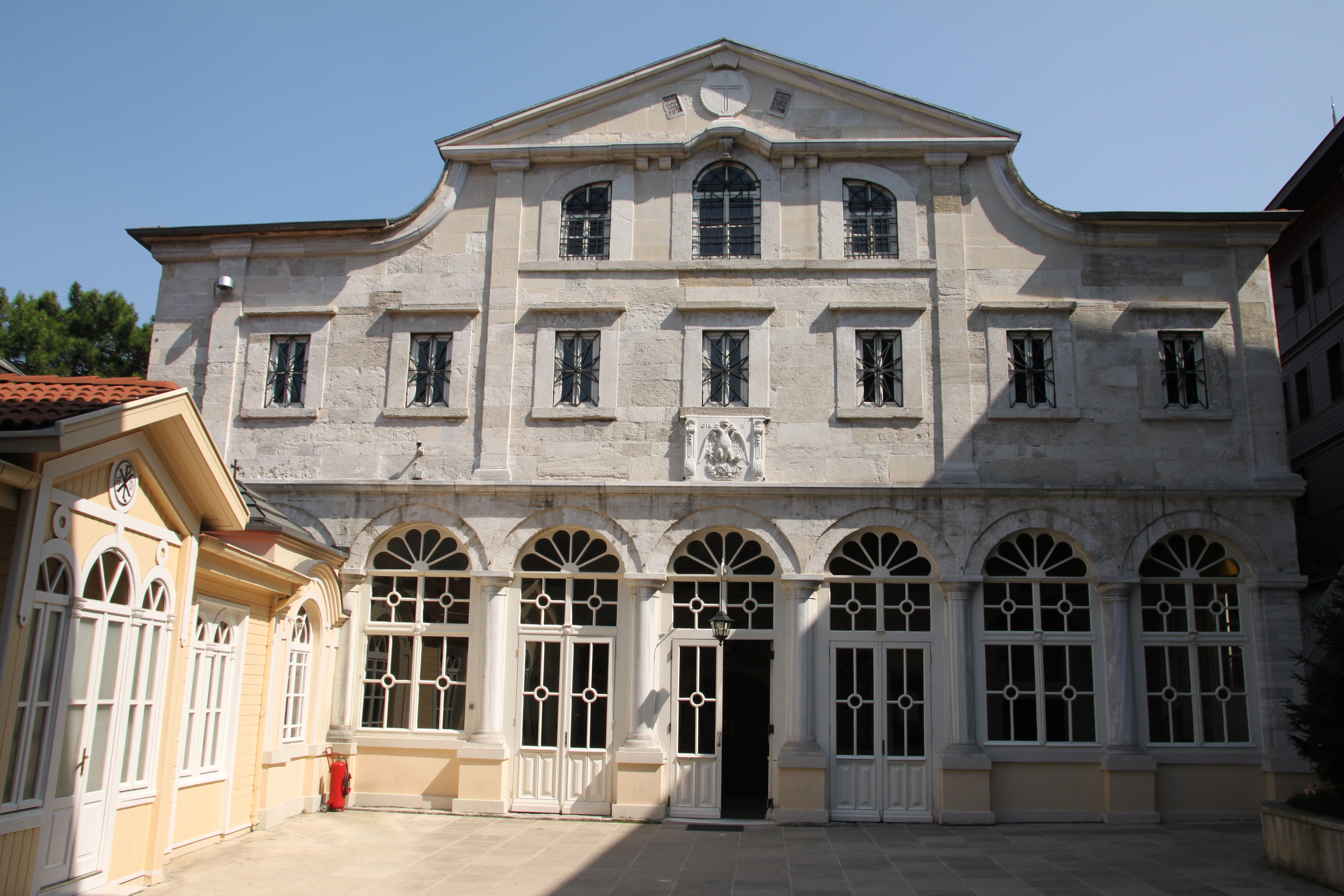
St. George's Cathedral in Istanbul

Other churches that are viewed by non-adherents as denominational are highly decentralized and do not have any formal denominational structure, authority, or record-keeping beyond the local congregation; several groups within the Restoration Movement and congregational churches fall into this category.

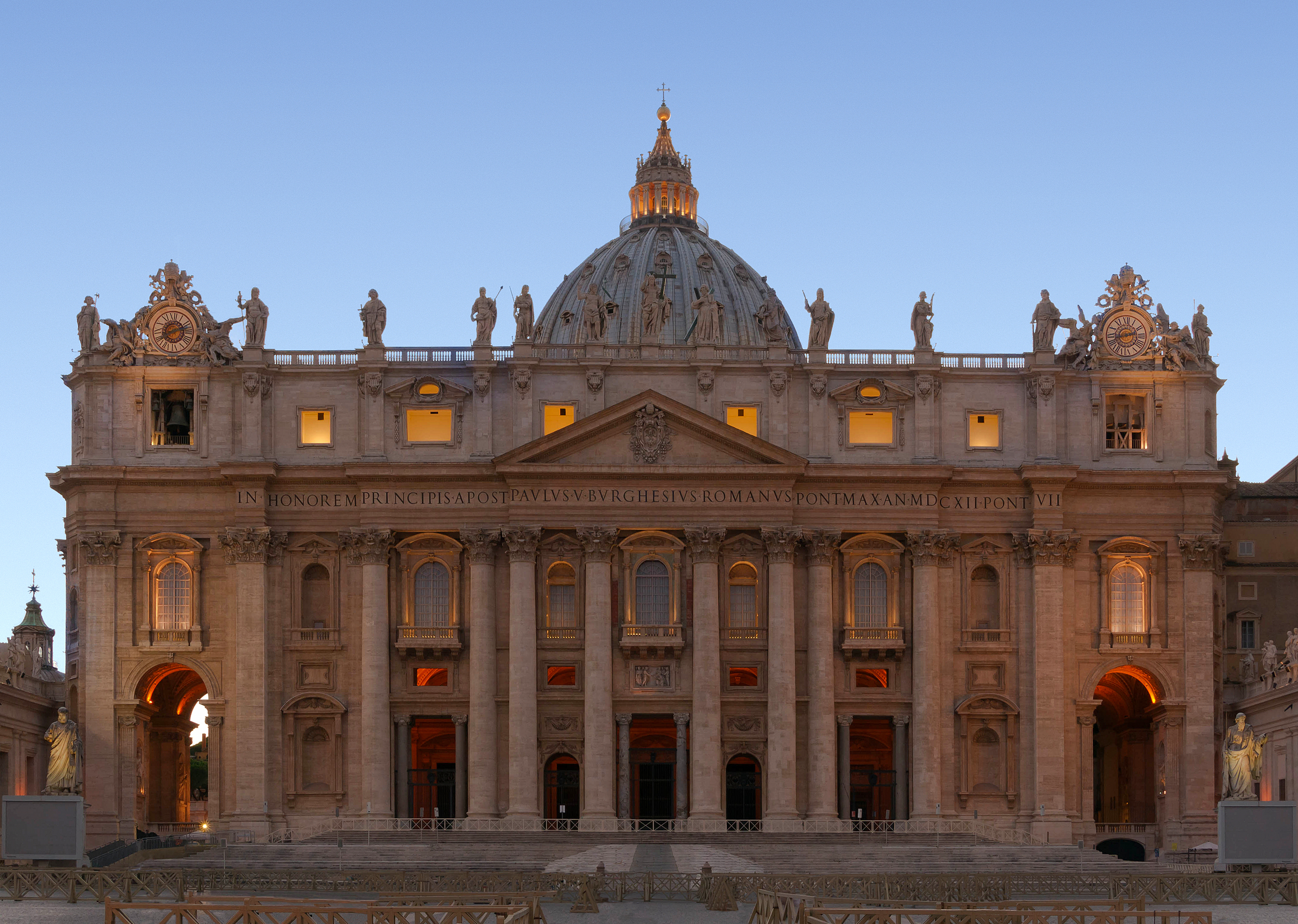
Saint Peter's Basilica in Vatican City

Some Christian bodies are large (e.g. Catholics, Orthodox, Pentecostals and nondenominationals, Anglicans or Baptists), while others are just a few small churches, and in most cases the relative size is not evident in this list except for the denominational group or movement as a whole (e.g. Church of the East, Oriental Orthodox Churches, or Lutheranism). The largest denomination is the Catholic Church with more than 1.4 billion members. The smallest of these groups may have only a few dozen adherents or an unspecified number of participants in independent churches as described below. As such, specific numbers and a certain size may not define a group as a denomination. However, as a general rule, the larger a group becomes, the more acceptance and legitimacy it gains.

Modern movements such as Christian fundamentalism, Radical Pietism, Evangelicalism, the Holiness movement and Charismatic Christianity sometimes cross denominational lines, or in some cases create new denominations out of two or more continuing groups (as is the case for many united and uniting churches, for example; e.g. the United Church of Christ). Such subtleties and complexities are not clearly depicted here.

Between denominations, theologians, and comparative religionists there are considerable disagreements about which groups can be properly called Christian or a Christian denomination as disagreements arise primarily from doctrinal differences between each other. As an example, this list contains groups also known as "rites" which many, such as the Roman Catholic Church, would say are not denominations as they are in full papal communion, and thus part of the Catholic Church. For the purpose of simplicity, this list is intended to reflect the self-understanding of each denomination. Explanations of different opinions concerning their status as Christian denominations can be found at their respective articles.

There is no official recognition in most parts of the world for religious bodies, and there is no official clearinghouse which could determine the status or respectability of religious bodies. Often there is considerable disagreement between various groups about whether others should be labeled with pejorative terms such as "cult", or about whether this or that group enjoys some measure of respectability. Such considerations often vary from place to place, or culture to culture, where one denomination may enjoy majority status in one region, but be widely regarded as a "dangerous cult" in another part of the world. Inclusion on this list does not indicate any judgment about the size, importance, or character of a group or its members.

== Early Christian ==
Early Christianity is often divided into three different branches that differ in theology and traditions, which all appeared in the 1st century AD/CE. They include Jewish Christianity, Pauline Christianity and Gnostic Christianity. All modern Christian denominations are said to have descended from the Jewish and Pauline Christianities, with Gnostic Christianity dying, or being hunted out of existence after the early Christian era and being largely forgotten until discoveries made in the late 19th and early twentieth centuries. There are also other theories on the origin of Christianity.

The following Christian groups appeared between the beginning of the Christian religion and the First Council of Nicaea in 325.

- Abelians
- Adamites
- Agapetae
- Alogi
- Maryamites
- Angelici
- Antidicomarians
- Arabici
- Arianism
  - Anomoeanism
  - Gothic Christianity
  - Semi-Arianism
- Audianism
- Colluthians
- Collyridianism
- Ebionites
- Elcesaites
- Encratites
  - Apotactics
  - Aquarii
  - Severians
- Eutychianism
- Johannines
- Marcionism
- Melitians
- Montanism
  - Artotyrite
  - Ascitans
  - Tascodrugites
- Nazarenes
- Nicolaism
- Novatianism
- Phantasiasts
- Thomasines
- Proto-orthodox Christianity

=== Gnosticism ===
- Antitactae
- Archontics
- Basilidians
- Borborites
  - Stratiotici
- Cainites
- Carpocratianism
- Cerdonians
- Mandaeism
- Kentaeans
- Luciferianism
- Naassenes
- Nicolaitans
- Ophites
- Perates
- Priscillianism
- Quqites
- Seleucians
- Sethianism
- Simonians
- Valentinianism
- Bardaisanites
- Colarbasians
- Marcosians
- Valesians

=== Late ancient and Medieval Christian ===
The following are groups of Christians appearing between the First Council of Nicaea, the East–West Schism and proto-Protestantism. Among these late ancient and Medieval Christian denominations, the most prominent and continuously operating have been the Church of the East and its successors, the Assyrian Church of the East, Ancient Church of the East, and Chaldean Catholic Church (full communion with Rome since 1552); and the Oriental Orthodox Churches. In the 5th century, two schisms occurred: the first for the Oriental Orthodox and the second for the Church of the East, which cemented the existence of three parallel ecclesiastical structures.

- Acephali
- Adelophagi
- Agnoetae
- Agonoclita
- Apostolic Brethren
- Alumbrados
- Bagnolians
- Barallot
- Barsanuphians
- Beguines and Beghards
- Bogomilism
- Bosnian Church
- Brautmystik
- Brethren of the Free Spirit
  - Amalrician
  - Men of Understanding
- Catharism
- Chazinzarians
- Christolytes
  - Albanenses
- Celtic Christianity
- Donatism
  - Circumcellions
  - Rogatists
- Dulcinians
- Euchites
  - Marcianists
- Eustathians
- Fraticelli
- Heresy of the Judaizers
- Joachimites
- Josephines
- Jovinianism
- Julianists
  - Gaianites
- Migetians
- Orléans heresy
- Pasagians
- Paulicianism
  - Astati
- Pneumatomachi
- Stephanites
- Tondrakians
- Turlupins

== Church of the East ==
During the Sasanian Period, a schism occurred between the Church of the East and the Roman-recognized state church of Rome. This church is also called the Nestorian Church or the Church of Persia. Declaring itself separate from the state church in 424–427, liturgically, it adhered to the East Syriac Rite. Theologically, it adopted the dyophysite doctrine of Nestorianism, which emphasizes the separateness of the divine and human natures of Jesus, and addresses Mary as Christotokos instead of Theotokos; the Church of the East also largely practiced aniconism, especially after Islamic conquests. Adhered to by groups such as the Keraites and Naimans (see Christianity among the Mongols), the Church of the East had a prominent presence in Inner Asia between the 11th and 14th centuries, but by the 15th century was largely confined to the Eastern Aramaic-speaking Assyrian communities of northern Mesopotamia, in and around the rough triangle formed by Mosul and Lakes Van and Urmia—the same general region where the Church of the East had first emerged between the 1st and 3rd centuries.

Its patriarchal lines divided in a tumultuous period from the 16th-19th century, finally consolidated into the Eastern Catholic Chaldean Church (in full communion with the Pope of Rome), and the Assyrian Church of the East. Other minor, modern related splinter groups include the Ancient Church of the East (split 1968 due to rejecting some changes made by Patriarch Shimun XXI Eshai) and the Chaldean Syrian Church. In 1995 the Chaldean Syrian Church reunified with the Assyrian Church of the East as an archbishopric. The Chaldean Syrian Church is headquartered in Thrissur, India. Together, the Assyrian, Ancient, Chaldean Syrian and Chaldean Catholic Church comprised about 1,120,000 members as of 2025. The three churches, among others, are part of Syriac Christianity.

== Oriental Orthodox ==
The Oriental Orthodox Churches are the Christian churches adhering to Miaphysite Christology and theology, with a combined global membership of 62 million as of 2019. These churches reject the Council of Chalcedon in 451 and the following Byzantine councils. Following the events of the council, the majority of the Eastern regions within the Byzantine Empire, particularly in Mesopotamia, the Levant, and Egypt, rejected the teachings and proceedings of the council. They continued as Miaphysite patriarchates in Antioch and Alexandria, with Armenia and Ethiopia formally joining them shortly thereafter.

Other denominations, such as the Eastern Orthodox Church and bodies in Old and True Orthodoxy, often label the Oriental Orthodox Churches as "Monophysite". As the Oriental Orthodox do not adhere to the teachings of Eutyches, they themselves reject this label, preferring the term "Miaphysite" based on Cyril of Alexandria's Christological formula.

Historically, the Oriental Orthodox Churches considered themselves collectively to be the one, holy, catholic and apostolic Church that Jesus founded. Some Christian denominations have recently considered the body of Oriental Orthodoxy to be a part of the one, holy, catholic and apostolic Church—a view which is gaining increasing acceptance in the wake of ecumenical dialogues between groups such as Eastern Orthodoxy, Roman and Eastern Catholicism, and Protestant Christianity.

All canonical or mainstream Oriental Orthodox Churches are part of the World Council of Churches, though only five form the Standing Conference of Oriental Orthodox Churches. Throughout Oriental Orthodoxy, non-mainstream or non-canonical churches have passed in and out of recognition with the mainstream churches (e.g., British Orthodox Church).

=== Canonical Oriental Orthodox ===
- Coptic Orthodox Church
  - French Coptic Orthodox Church
- Syriac Orthodox Church of Antioch
  - Malankara Jacobite Syrian Christian Church
- Armenian Apostolic Church
  - Church of Caucasian Albania
  - Mother See of Holy Etchmiadzin
  - Holy See of Cilicia
  - Armenian Patriarchate of Constantinople
  - Armenian Patriarchate of Jerusalem
- Ethiopian Orthodox Tewahedo Church
- Eritrean Orthodox Tewahedo Church
- Malankara Orthodox Syrian Church

=== Independent Oriental Orthodox ===
- British Orthodox Church
- Celtic Orthodox Church
- Malabar Independent Syrian Church
- Orthodox Church of the Gauls
- Tigrayan Orthodox Tewahedo Church
- Orthodox-Catholic Church of America

== Eastern Orthodox ==
Eastern Orthodoxy is one of the main Chalcedonian Christian branches, alongside Roman Catholicism and Protestantism. Each Eastern Orthodox church considers itself part of the one true church, and pre-denominational. Though they consider themselves pre-denominational, being the original Church of Christ before 1054, some scholars suggest the Eastern Orthodox and Catholic churches began after the East–West schism.

=== Canonical Eastern Orthodox ===
The Eastern Orthodox Church, officially the Orthodox Catholic Church, claims continuity (based upon apostolic succession) with the early Church as part of the state church of Rome. The Eastern Orthodox Church had about 230 million members as of 2019, making it the second largest single denomination behind the Catholic Church. Some of them have a disputed administrative status (i.e. their autonomy or autocephaly is not recognized universally). Eastern Orthodox churches by and large remain in communion with one another, although this has broken at times throughout its history. Two examples of impaired communion between the Orthodox churches include the Moscow–Constantinople schisms of 1996 and 2018. There are also independent churches subscribing to the Eastern Orthodox traditions.

- Ecumenical Patriarchate of Constantinople
  - Greek Orthodox Archdiocese of Italy and Malta
  - Greek Orthodox Archdiocese of America
  - Albanian Orthodox Diocese of America
  - Greek Orthodox Archdiocese of Canada
  - Greek Orthodox Archdiocese of Great Britain
  - Greek Orthodox Archdiocese of Australia
  - Vicariate for Palestine and Jordan in the USA
  - Finnish Orthodox Church
  - Greek Orthodox Church of Crete
  - Monastic Community of Mount Athos
  - Korean Orthodox Church
  - Estonian Apostolic Orthodox Church
  - Ukrainian Orthodox Church of the USA
  - Ukrainian Orthodox Church of Canada
  - Orthodox Metropolitanate of Hong Kong
    - Exarchate of the Philippines
  - Orthodox Metropolitanate of Singapore
  - American Carpatho-Russian Orthodox Diocese
  - Exarchate of Lithuania
- Greek Orthodox Church of Alexandria
- Greek Orthodox Church of Antioch
  - Antiochian Orthodox Archdiocese of North America
  - Antiochian Orthodox Archdiocese of Australia
  - Antiochian Orthodox Archdiocese of Mexico
  - Antiochian Orthodox Mission in the Philippines
  - Antiochian Orthodox Archdiocese of Chile
- Greek Orthodox Church of Jerusalem
  - Greek Orthodox Church of Sinai
- Russian Orthodox Church
  - Russian Orthodox Church Outside Russia
  - Russian Orthodox Church in Finland
  - Japanese Orthodox Church
  - Chinese Orthodox Church
  - Estonian Orthodox Church (Moscow Patriarchate)
  - Moldovan Orthodox Church
  - Belarusian Orthodox Church
  - Philippine Orthodox Church (Moscow Patriarchate)
  - Patriarchal Exarchate in South-East Asia
  - Patriarchal Exarchate in Western Europe
  - Patriarchal Parishes in the USA
  - Patriarchal Parishes in Canada
- Georgian Orthodox Church
- Serbian Orthodox Church
  - Serbian Orthodox Ohrid Archbishopric
  - Archdiocese of Belgrade and Karlovci
    - Serbian Metropolitanate of Skopje
  - Serbian Metropolitanate of Dabar
  - Serbian Metropolitanate of Montenegro
  - Serbian Metropolitanate of Zagreb
  - Serbian Metropolitanate of Australia
- Romanian Orthodox Church
  - Romanian Metropolis of Bessarabia
  - Romanian Metropolia of the Americas
- Bulgarian Orthodox Church
  - Diocese of North America and Australia
- Cypriot Orthodox Church
- Orthodox Church of Greece
- Albanian Orthodox Church
- Polish Orthodox Church
- Czech and Slovak Orthodox Church
- Orthodox Church in America
  - Archdiocese of Canada
  - Romanian Orthodox Episcopate of America
  - Albanian Orthodox Archdiocese in America
  - Exarchate of Mexico
- Orthodox Church of Ukraine
- Macedonian Orthodox Church

=== Independent Eastern Orthodox ===
These Eastern Orthodox churches are not in communion with the mainstream or canonical Eastern Orthodox Church. Some of these denominations consider themselves as part of True Orthodoxy or the Old Believers. True Orthodoxy, or Genuine Orthodoxy, separated from the mainstream church over issues of ecumenism and calendar reform since the 1920s; and the Russian Old Believers refused to accept the liturgical and ritual changes made by Patriarch Nikon of Moscow between 1652 and 1666. Several Old Believer denominations have reunified with the Russian Orthodox Church and subsequent wider Eastern Orthodox communion.

- Abkhazian Orthodox Church
- American Orthodox Catholic Church
- Autocephalous Turkish Orthodox Patriarchate
- Belarusian Autocephalous Orthodox Church
- Latvian Orthodox Church
- Lusitanian Catholic Orthodox Church
- Montenegrin Orthodox Church (1993)
- Orthodox Catholic Church of France
- Independent Ukrainian Orthodox churches:
  - Ukrainian Autocephalous Orthodox Church Canonical
  - Ukrainian Orthodox Church – Kyiv Patriarchate

==== True Orthodoxy ====
- Old Calendar Bulgarian Orthodox Church
- Old Calendar Romanian Orthodox Church
- Russian Orthodox Autonomous Church
- Serbian True Orthodox Church
- Russian Orthodox Old-Rite Church
- Lipovan Orthodox Old-Rite Church
- Russian Old-Orthodox Church
- Pomorian Old-Orthodox Church

==== Other Orthodox movements ====
- Bogomoljci
- Hesychasm
  - Kollyvades
  - Palamism
    - Neopalamism
- Imiaslavie (Onomatodoxy)
- Sophianism
- Inochentism
- Josephism
- Old Believers
  - Bespopovtsy
    - Fedoseevtsy
    - Filippians
  - Chasovennye
  - Dyrniki
  - Popovtsy
    - Beglopopovtsy
- Old Calendarists
- Spiritual Christianity
  - Doukhobors
    - Freedomites
  - Khlysts
    - Postniki
      - Staroizrail
        - New Israel
  - Molokans
    - Sukhie Baptisty
  - Skoptsy
  - Subbotniks
  - Yehowists

== Catholic ==
The Catholic Church, or Roman Catholic Church, is composed of 24 autonomous sui iuris particular churches: the Latin Church and the 23 Eastern Catholic Churches. It considers itself the one, holy, catholic and apostolic Church that Christ founded, and which Saint Peter initiated along with the missionary work of Saint Paul and others. As such, the Catholic Church does not consider itself a denomination, but rather considers itself pre-denominational, the original Church of Christ. Continuity is claimed based upon apostolic succession with the early Church. The Catholic population exceeds 1.4 billion as of 2025, making up the majority of Western Christianity. Stemming from the one Roman Catholic institution, there exists several Independent Catholic churches which have expanded the Catholic denominational family, becoming Old and Old Roman Catholicism, and Liberal Catholics.

=== Latin (Roman) Catholic ===
The Latin Church is the largest and most widely known of the 24 sui iuris churches that together make up the Catholic Church. It is headed by the Bishop of Rome—the Pope—with headquarters in Vatican City, enclaved within Rome, Italy. As of 2015, the Latin Church comprised 1.255 billion members.

=== Eastern (Oriental) Catholic ===
All of the following are particular churches of the Catholic Church. They are all in communion with the Pope as Bishop of Rome and acknowledge his claim of universal jurisdiction and authority. They have some minor distinct theological emphases and expressions (for instance, in the case of those that are of Greek/Byzantine tradition, concerning some non-doctrinal aspects of the Latin view of Purgatory and clerical celibacy). The Eastern Catholic Churches and the Latin Church (which are united in the worldwide Catholic Church) share the same doctrine and sacraments, and thus the same faith. The total membership of the churches accounted for approximately 18 million members as of 2019.

Alexandrian Rite

- Coptic Catholic Church
- Eritrean Catholic Church
- Ethiopian Catholic Church

Armenian Rite

- Armenian Catholic Church

Byzantine Rite

- Albanian Greek Catholic Church
- Belarusian Greek Catholic Church
- Bulgarian Greek Catholic Church
- Greek Catholic Church of Croatia and Serbia
- Greek Byzantine Catholic Church
- Hungarian Greek Catholic Church
- Italo-Albanian Catholic Church
- Macedonian Greek Catholic Church
- Melkite Greek Catholic Church
- Romanian Greek Catholic Church
- Russian Greek Catholic Church
- Ruthenian Greek/Byzantine Catholic Church
- Slovak Greek Catholic Church
- Ukrainian Greek Catholic Church

East Syriac Rite

- Chaldean Catholic Church
- Syro-Malabar Catholic Church

West Syriac Rite

- Maronite Church
- Syriac Catholic Church
- Syro-Malankara Catholic Church

=== Independent Catholic ===
Independent Catholics consists of those denominations embodying catholicity, and have initially separated from the Latin Church in 1724 through the consecrations of bishops for the present-day Old Catholic Archdiocese of Utrecht without papal approval. Largely distinguished by their rejection of papal infallibility and supremacy, most Independent Catholic churches are unrecognized by the Vatican, although their sacraments have been recognized as valid but illicit.

- American Catholic Church in the United States
- American National Catholic Church
- Antiochian Catholic Church in America
- Augustana Catholic Church
- Argentine Catholic Apostolic Church
- Apostolic Catholic Church (Philippines)
- Brazilian Catholic Apostolic Church
- Catholic Apostolic Church of Antioch
- Catholic Christian Church
- Catholic Patriotic Association
  - Underground church
- Christ Catholic Church
- Community of the Lady of All Nations
- Congregation of Mary Immaculate Queen
- Ecumenical Catholic Church
- Ecumenical Catholic Church of Christ
- Ecumenical Catholic Communion
- Evangelical Catholic Church (Independent Catholic)
- Fraternité Notre-Dame
- Free Catholic Church in Germany
- Imani Temple African-American Catholic Congregation
- Istituto Mater Boni Consilii
- Liberal Catholic Church
  - Liberal Catholic Church International
  - Liberal Catholic Church, Province of the United States of America
  - Old Catholic Apostolic Church
  - The Young Rite
- Mariavite Church
  - Old Catholic Mariavite Church
  - Catholic Mariavite Church
- Mexican Catholic Apostolic Church
- Most Holy Family Monastery
- Union of Utrecht of the Old Catholic Churches
  - Catholic Diocese of the Old Catholics in Germany
  - Christian Catholic Church of Switzerland
  - Old Catholic Church of Austria
  - Old Catholic Church of the Czech Republic
  - Old Catholic Church of the Netherlands
  - Polish-Catholic Church in the Republic of Poland
- Old Roman Catholic Church in Great Britain
- Palmarian Catholic Church
- Philippine Independent (Aglipayan) Church
- Rabelados
- Reformed Catholic Church (Venezuela)
- St. Stanislaus Kostka Church (St. Louis, Missouri)
- Society of Saint Pius V
- Traditionalist Mexican-American Catholic Church
- True Catholic Church
- Ukrainian Orthodox Greek Catholic Church
- Union of Scranton
  - Nordic Catholic Church
  - Polish National Catholic Church
- Venezuelan Catholic Apostolic Church
- Worldwide Communion of Catholic Apostolic Churches

=== Catholic movements ===
- Augustinianism
- Apostles of Infinite Love
- Charismatic Catholics
- Christian Family Movement
- Conciliarism
- Cult of the Holy Spirit
- Erasmianism
- Febronianism
- Flagellantism
- Fu Jen School
- Gallicanism
- Hebrew Catholics
- Jansenism
- Jesuits
- Legionaries of Christ
- Liberal Catholicism
- Modernist Catholics
- Molinism
- Neocatechumenal Way
- Occamism
  - Teilhardianism
- Opus Dei
- Origenism
- Petite Eglise
- Quietism
- School of Salamanca
- Scotism
- Sedevacantism
  - Palmarian Catholic Church
- Sedeprivationism
- Thomism
- Traditionalist Catholicism
  - Society of Saint Pius X
- Ultramontanism

== Protestant ==
Protestantism is a movement within Christianity which owes its name to the 1529 Protestation at Speyer, but originated in 1517 when Martin Luther began his dispute with the Roman Catholic Church. This period of time, known as the Reformation, began a series of events resulting over the next 500 years in several newly denominated churches (listed below). Some denominations were started by intentionally dividing themselves from the Roman Catholic Church, such as in the case of the English Reformation while others, such as with Luther's followers, were excommunicated after attempting reform. New denominations and organizations formed through further divisions within Protestant churches since the Reformation began. A denomination labeled "Protestant" subscribes to the fundamental Protestant principles—though not always—that is scripture alone, justification by faith alone, and the universal priesthood of believers.

The majority of contemporary Protestants are members of Adventism, Anglicanism, the Baptist churches, Calvinism (Reformed Protestantism), Lutheranism, Methodism and Pentecostalism. Nondenominational, Evangelical, charismatic, neo-charismatic, independent, Convergence, and other churches are on the rise, and constitute a significant part of Protestant Christianity.

This list gives only an overview, and certainly does not mention all of the Protestant denominations. The exact number of Protestant denominations, including the members of the denominations, is difficult to calculate and depends on definition. A group that fits the generally accepted definition of "Protestant" might not officially use the term. Therefore, it should be taken with caution. The most accepted figure among various authors and scholars includes around 900 million to a little over 1 billion Protestant Christians.

=== Proto-Protestant ===
Proto-Protestantism refers to movements similar to the Protestant Reformation, but before 1517, when Martin Luther (1483–1546) is reputed to have nailed the Ninety-Five-Theses to the church door. Major early Reformers were Peter Waldo (c. 1140–c. 1205), John Wycliffe (1320s–1384), and Jan Hus (c. 1369–1415). It is not completely correct to call these groups Protestant due to the fact that some of them had nothing to do with the 1529 protestation at Speyer which coined the term Protestant. In particular, the Utraquists were eventually accommodated as a separate Catholic rite by the papacy after a military attempt to end their movement failed. On the other hand, the surviving Waldensians ended up joining Reformed Protestantism, so it is not completely inaccurate to refer to their movement as Protestant; the Waldensian Evangelical Church is a well known existing body in that tradition. The Hussites are presently represented in the Moravian Church, Unity of the Brethren and the Czechoslovak Hussite Church.

- Arnoldists
- Berengarians
- Brethren of the Common Life
- Devotio Moderna
- Friends of God
- Henricans
- Hussites
  - Czechoslovak Hussite Church
  - Moravian Church
  - Neo-Adamites
  - Orebites
  - Praguers
  - Taborites
  - Utraquists
  - Unity of the Brethren
- Lollards
- Pataria
- Petrobrusians
- Piagnoni
- Strigolniki
- Waldensians
  - Waldensian Evangelical Church

=== Lutheran ===
,

Lutherans are a major branch of Protestantism, identifying with the theology of Martin Luther, a German friar, ecclesiastical reformer, and theologian. Lutheranism initially began as an attempt to reform the Catholic Church before the excommunication of its members. Lutherans are divided among High Church, Confessional, Pietist and Liberal churchmanships, though these can overlap, e.g. the Communion of Nordic Lutheran Dioceses is High Church and Confessional. The whole of Lutheranism had about 70-90 million members in 2018, and its largest communion, the Lutheran World Federation, had a total of 78,431,111 members as of 2023, making it the sixth-largest communion. The largest non-United Lutheran denomination was the Ethiopian Evangelical Church Mekane Yesus, an Eastern Protestant Christian group.

- Apostolic Lutheran Church of America
- Association of Free Lutheran Congregations
- Church of the Lutheran Brethren of America
- Church of the Lutheran Confession
- Concordia Lutheran Conference
- Confessional Evangelical Lutheran Conference
  - Evangelical Lutheran Church "Concord"
  - American Association of Lutheran Churches
  - Evangelical Lutheran Church of Brazil
  - Evangelical Lutheran Church of England
- Evangelical Lutheran Church of São Paulo
- Evangelical Lutheran Free Church (Germany)
- Evangelical Lutheran Synod
- Evangelical Lutheran Church - Synod of France and Belgium
- Evangelical Lutheran Diocese of North America
- General Lutheran Church
  - Gutnius Lutheran Church
  - Independent Evangelical-Lutheran Church
  - Japan Lutheran Church
- International Lutheran Council
- Kosovo Protestant Evangelical Church
- Lanka Lutheran Church
- Latvian Evangelical Lutheran Church in America
- Lutheran Church—Canada
- Lutheran Church—Hong Kong Synod
- Lutheran Church–Missouri Synod
- Lutheran Church of Australia
- Lutheran Church of Central Africa Malawi Conference
- Lutheran Church of Central Africa Zambia Conference
- Lutheran Confessional Church
- Laestadian Lutheran Church
- Lutheran Church - International
- Lutheran Congregations in Mission for Christ
- Lutheran Ministerium and Synod - USA
- Lutheran World Federation
  - Andhra Evangelical Lutheran Church
  - Arcot Lutheran Church
  - Batak Christian Protestant Church
  - Church of Denmark
  - Church of the Faroe Islands
  - Church of Iceland
  - Church of Norway
  - Church of Sweden
  - Estonian Evangelical Lutheran Church
  - Evangelical Church of the Augsburg Confession in Slovakia
  - Evangelical Church of the Lutheran Confession in Brazil
  - Evangelical Lutheran Church in America
  - Evangelical Lutheran Church in Canada
  - Evangelical Lutheran Church in Italy
  - Evangelical Lutheran Church in Madhya Pradesh
  - Evangelical Lutheran Church in Southern Africa
  - Evangelical Lutheran Church in Tanzania
  - Evangelical Lutheran Church in the Himalayan States
  - Evangelical Lutheran Church of Finland
  - Evangelical Lutheran Church of Latvia
  - Evangelical Lutheran Church of Papua New Guinea
  - Evangelical Lutheran Free Church of Norway
  - Gossner Evangelical Lutheran Church in Chotanagpur and Assam
  - Indian Evangelical Lutheran Church
  - Jeypore Evangelical Lutheran Church
  - Lutheran Church of Australia
  - Malagasy Lutheran Church
  - Northern Evangelical Lutheran Church
  - Simalungun Protestant Christian Church
  - South Andhra Lutheran Church
  - Tamil Evangelical Lutheran Church
- North American Lutheran Church
- Old Apostolic Lutheran Church
- Ukrainian Lutheran Church
- Wisconsin Evangelical Lutheran Synod
- Lutheran Evangelical Protestant Church

=== Radical Pietist ===
Those who separated from established Lutheran churches to form their own denominations are known as Radical Pietists (as opposed to Pietistic Lutherans, who remain in the Lutheran churches (such as the Church of the Lutheran Brethren) and combine its emphasis on Biblical doctrine with the importance of individual piety and living a holy Christian life. Although the Radical Pietists broke with Lutheranism, its influence on Anglicanism, in particular John Wesley, led to the spawning of the Methodist movement.

- Amana Society
- Bible Fellowship Church
- Community of True Inspiration
- Evangelical Covenant Church
- Evangelical Covenant Church of America
- Evangelical Free Church
  - Evangelical Free Church of America
  - Evangelical Free Church of Canada
  - Evangelical Free Church of China (Hong Kong based)
  - Evangelical Free Church of Japan
  - Evangelical Free Church of Malaysia
  - Evangelical Free Church of Singapore
- Temple Society (Templers)
- United Christian Church

=== Reformed ===
Calvinism, also known as the Reformed tradition or Reformed Protestantism, is a movement which broke from the Catholic Church in the 16th century. Reformed Christianity is represented in the Continental Reformed, Presbyterian, and Congregationalist traditions, along with Reformed Anglican and Reformed Baptist denominations (the latter two are listed under the Anglican and Baptist sections of this article, respectively). Calvinism follows the theological traditions set down by John Calvin, John Knox and other Reformation-era theologians. Calvinists differ from Lutherans on the nature of the real presence of Christ in the Eucharist, theories of worship, and the use of God's law for believers, among other things. There are from 60 to 80 million Christians identifying as Reformed or Calvinist according to statistics gathered in 2018. Including only full members, the World Communion of Reformed Churches numbered more than 100,000,000 members as of 2025. (Note: Together, the WCRC's full member denominations claim about 100,895,098 members. If associate and affiliated denominations are included, the individual membership reaches 140,013,613. List of denominations and sources at World Communion of Reformed Churches#Member churches.) It is the largest or second largest Protestant community in the world. (Note: The WCRC’s full member denominations collectively claim over 100 million members. The Anglican Communion (AC) claims only 85 million members. Therefore, by self-reported numbers, the WCRC is larger than the AC with full members alone. However, there are sources that indicate that the total membership of the AC churches is actually 110 million. This would make the AC larger than the WCRC if associate and affiliate members are not counted. If associate and affiliate members are counted, the WCRC has 140 million members and surpasses any Protestant communion in the world. Therefore, whether the WCRC is the largest or second largest Protestant communion depends on the number considered for the AC and whether or not the WCRC’s associate and affiliate members are counted.)

==== Continental Reformed churches ====
- Afrikaans Protestant Church
- Canadian and American Reformed Churches
- Christian Evangelical Church in Minahasa
- Evangelical Reformed Church in Bavaria and Northwestern Germany
- Christian Reformed Church in Sierra Leone
- Christian Reformed Church in South Africa
- Evangelical Reformed Church of Christ
- Christian Reformed Church of Nigeria
- Continued Reformed Churches in the Netherlands
- Christian Reformed Churches of Australia
- Dutch Reformed Church (joined the Protestant Church in the Netherlands in 2004)
- Dutch Reformed Church in Botswana
- Dutch Reformed Church in South Africa - NG Church
- Federation of Swiss Protestant Churches
- Free Reformed Churches of Australia
- Free Reformed Churches of North America
- Free Reformed Churches of South Africa
- Heritage Reformed Congregations
- Netherlands Reformed Churches
- Netherlands Reformed Congregations
- Nigeria Reformed Church
- Orthodox Christian Reformed Church
- Polish Reformed Church
- Protestant Church in the Netherlands
- Protestant Church in Western Indonesia
- Protestant Reformed Christian Church in Croatia
- Protestant Reformed Church of Luxembourg
- Protestant Reformed Churches in America
- Reformed Christian Calvinist Church in Croatia
- Reformed Christian Church in Serbia
- Reformed Church in America
- Reformed Church in Austria
- Reformed Church in Hungary
- Reformed Church in Latvia
- Reformed Church in Romania
- Reformed Church in Transcarpathia
- Reformed Church in the United States
- Reformed Church of Christ in Nigeria
- Reformed Church of East Africa
- Reformed Church of France
- Reformed Churches in the Netherlands
- Reformed Churches in the Netherlands (Liberated)
- Reformed Churches of New Zealand
- Reformed Synod of Denmark
- Restored Reformed Church
- United Church of Christ
- United Reformed Church
- United Reformed Church in Congo
- United Reformed Churches in North America
- Uniting Reformed Church in Southern Africa

==== Presbyterianism ====
- Africa Evangelical Presbyterian Church
- Associated Presbyterian Churches
- Associate Reformed Presbyterian Church
- Associate Reformed Presbyterian Church of Mexico
- Bible Presbyterian Church
- Christian Reformed Churches
- Christian Reformed Church in North America
- Church of Central Africa Presbyterian
- Church of Scotland
- Communion of Reformed Evangelical Churches
- Conservative Presbyterian Church in Brazil
- Costa Rican Evangelical Presbyterian Church
- Covenant Presbyterian Church
- Cumberland Presbyterian Church
- Cumberland Presbyterian Church in America
- Didasko
- Evangelical and Reformed Church in Honduras
- Evangelical Covenant Order of Presbyterians
- Evangelical Presbyterian and Reformed Church in Peru
- Evangelical Presbyterian Church (Australia)
- Evangelical Presbyterian Church in England and Wales
- Evangelical Presbyterian Church, Ghana
- Evangelical Presbyterian Church of Malawi
- Evangelical Presbyterian Church of Ukraine
- Evangelical Presbyterian Church (United States)
- Evangelical Union (Scotland)
- Free Church of Scotland (1843–1900)
- Free Church of Scotland (post 1900)
- Free Church of Scotland (Continuing)
- St. Andrew's Presbyterian Church (Argentina)
- Free Presbyterian Church (Australia)
- Free Presbyterian Church of North America
- Free Presbyterian Church of Scotland
- Free Presbyterian Church of Ulster
- Fundamentalist Presbyterian Church in Brazil
- Grace Presbyterian Church of New Zealand
- Greek Evangelical Church
- Independent Presbyterian Church of Brazil
- International Presbyterian Church
- Lithuanian Evangelical Reformed Church
- National Evangelical Presbyterian Church of Guatemala
- National Presbyterian Church in Chile
- National Presbyterian Church in Mexico
- National Union of Independent Reformed Evangelical Churches of France
- Original Secession Church
- Orthodox Presbyterian Church
- Presbyterian Church in America
- Presbyterian Church in Canada
- Presbyterian Church in Chile
- Presbyterian Church in Honduras
- Presbyterian Church in Ireland
- Presbyterian Church in Korea (HapDong)
- Presbyterian Church in Korea (Koshin)
- Presbyterian Church in Korea (TongHap)
- Presbyterian Church in Liberia
- Presbyterian Church in Malaysia
- Presbyterian Church in Singapore
- Presbyterian Church in Sudan
- Presbyterian Church in Taiwan
- Presbyterian Church in Uganda
- Presbyterian Church of Africa
- Presbyterian Church of Aotearoa New Zealand
- Presbyterian Church of Australia
- Presbyterian Church of Belize
- Presbyterian Church of Brazil
- Presbyterian Church of East Africa
- Presbyterian Church of Eastern Australia
- Presbyterian Church of England
- Presbyterian Church of Ghana
- Presbyterian Church of India
- Presbyterian Church of Mozambique
- Presbyterian Church of Nigeria
- Presbyterian Church of Pakistan
- Presbyterian Church of the Philippines
- Presbyterian Church of Wales
- Presbyterian Church (USA)
- Presbyterian Reformed Church (Australia)
- Reformed Evangelical Church in Myanmar
- Reformed Presbyterian Church, Evangelical Synod
- Reformed Presbyterian Church General Assembly
- Reformed Presbyterian Church, General Synod
- Reformed Presbyterian Church – Hanover Presbytery
- Reformed Presbyterian Church in the United States
- Reformed Presbyterian Church of Australia
- Reformed Presbyterian Church of Ireland
- Reformed Presbyterian Church of Malawi
- Reformed Presbyterian Church of North America
- Reformed Presbyterian Church of Scotland
- Relief Church
- Renewed Presbyterian Church in Brazil
- Southern Presbyterian Church (Australia)
- Sudan Evangelical Presbyterian Church
- United Free Church of Scotland
- United Presbyterian Church (Scotland)
- United Presbyterian Church of Brazil
- United Presbyterian Church of North America
- United Presbyterian Church of Pakistan
- Uniting Presbyterian Church in Southern Africa
- United Secession Church
- Upper Cumberland Presbyterian Church
- Westminster Presbyterian Church of Australia

==== Congregationalism ====
- Church of Niue
- Church of Tuvalu
- Congregational Christian Church in American Samoa
- Congregational Christian Church in Samoa
- Congregational Christian Churches in Canada
- Congregational Federation
- Congregational Federation of Australia
- Congregational Union of England and Wales
- Congregational Union of Ireland
- Congregational Union of New Zealand
- Congregational Union of Scotland
- Conservative Congregational Christian Conference
- Cook Islands Christian Church
- Evangelical Congregational Church in Angola
- Evangelical Congregational Church in Argentina
- Evangelical Congregational Church in Brazil
- Evangelical Fellowship of Congregational Churches
- Fellowship of Congregational Churches (Australia)
- Kiribati Protestant Church
- National Association of Congregational Christian Churches
- Nauru Congregational Church
- Reformed Congregational Churches
- Union of Evangelical Congregational Churches in Brazil
- Union of Evangelical Congregational Churches in Bulgaria
- United Church in the Solomon Islands
- United Church of Christ-Congregational in the Marshall Islands
- United Congregational Church of Southern Africa

=== Anglican ===
Anglicanism or Episcopalianism has referred to itself as the via media between Lutheranism and Reformed Christianity, as well as between Roman Catholicism and Protestantism. The majority of Anglicans consider themselves part of the one, holy, catholic and apostolic Church within the Anglican Communion. Anglicans or Episcopalians also self-identify as both Catholic and Reformed. Although the use of the term "Protestant" to refer to Anglicans was once common, it is controversial today, with some rejecting the label and others accepting it. Anglicans uniting in the Anglican Communion numbered over 85 million in 2018. Tabulating each Anglican Communion-member, it grew to more than 94,613,000 members as of 2025, excluding the United churches, remaining the third-largest Christian communion.

==== Anglican Communion ====
- Anglican Church in Aotearoa, New Zealand and Polynesia
- Anglican Church in Central America
- Anglican Church in Japan
- Anglican Church of Australia
- Anglican Church of Bermuda
- Anglican Church of Canada
- Anglican Church of Kenya
- Anglican Church of Korea
- Anglican Church of Melanesia
- Anglican Church of Mexico
- Anglican Church of Papua New Guinea
- Anglican Church of South America
- Anglican Church of Southern Africa
- Anglican Church of Tanzania
- Anglican Episcopal Church of Brazil
- Church in the Province of the West Indies
- Church in Wales
- Church of Ceylon
- Church of England
- Church of Ireland
- Church of Nigeria
- Church of the Province of Central Africa
- Church of the Province of Myanmar
- Church of the Province of South East Asia
- Church of the Province of the Indian Ocean
- Church of the Province of West Africa
- Church of Uganda
- Episcopal Church (United States)
- Episcopal Church in Jerusalem and the Middle East
- Episcopal Church in the Philippines
- Episcopal Church of Cuba
- Hong Kong Anglican Church
- Lusitanian Catholic Apostolic Evangelical Church
- Parish of the Falkland Islands
- Province of the Anglican Church of Burundi
- Province of the Anglican Church of Rwanda
- Province of the Anglican Church of the Congo
- Province of the Episcopal Church of South Sudan
- Province of the Episcopal Church of Sudan
- Scottish Episcopal Church
- Spanish Reformed Episcopal Church

United and Uniting churches

- Church of Bangladesh
- Church of North India
- Church of Pakistan
- Church of South India
- Mar Thoma Syrian Church (Protestant Eastern Christian)

==== Other Anglican churches and Continuing Anglican movement ====
There are numerous churches following the Anglican tradition that are not in full communion with the Anglican Communion. Some churches split due to changes in the Book of Common Prayer and the ordination of women, forming Anglo-Catholic, Anglican Papal or Evangelical Anglican communities. A select few of these churches are recognized by certain individual provinces of the Anglican Communion.

- African Orthodox Church
- Anglican Catholic Church
- Anglican Catholic Church of Canada
- Anglican Church in America
- Anglican Church in Brazil
- Anglican Church in North America
- Anglican Church of India
- Anglican Episcopal Church (USA)
- Anglican Mission in the Americas
- Anglican Orthodox Church
- Anglican Province of America
- Anglican Province of Christ the King
- Apostolic Episcopal Church
- Christian Episcopal Church
- Church of England (Continuing)
- Church of England in South Africa
- Diocese of the Holy Cross
- Episcopal Missionary Church
- Free Church of England
- Free Protestant Episcopal Church
- Holy Catholic Church Anglican Rite
- Independent Anglican Church Canada Synod
- Orthodox Anglican Church
- Reformed Episcopal Church
- Southern Episcopal Church
- The African Church
- The Traditional Anglican Church in Australia
- Traditional Anglican Church
- United Episcopal Church of North America

=== Anabaptist ===
The Anabaptists trace their origins to the Radical Reformation. Alternative to other early Protestants, Anabaptists were seen as an early offshoot of Protestantism, although the view has been challenged by some Anabaptists. There were approximately 2.1 million Anabaptists as of 2015. Anabaptists are categorized into Old Order Anabaptism (such as the Old Brethren German Baptist), Conservative Anabaptism (such as the Pilgrim Mennonite Conference, Beachy Amish and Dunkard Brethren Church), and mainline/assimilated Anabaptism.

Amish

- Amish Mennonite
- Beachy Amish
- Kauffman Amish Mennonite
- Michigan Amish Churches
- Nebraska Amish
- New Order Amish
- Old Order Amish
- Swartzentruber Amish

Hutterites

- Dariusleut
- Lehrerleut
- Schmiedeleut

Mennonites

- Alliance of Mennonite Evangelical Congregations
- Biblical Mennonite Alliance
- Canadian Conference of Mennonite Brethren Churches
- Chortitzer Mennonite Conference
- Church of God in Christ, Mennonite (Holdeman Mennonites)
- Conference of the Mennonite Brethren Churches in India
- Evangelical Mennonite Church
- Evangelical Mennonite Conference
- Evangelical Mennonite Mission Conference
- Evangelical Missionary Church
- Fellowship of Evangelical Bible Churches
- Fellowship of Evangelical Churches
- Japan Mennonite Brethren Conference
- Kleine Gemeinde
- Markham-Waterloo Mennonite Conference
- Mennonite Brethren Churches
- Mennonite Church Canada
- Mennonite Church in the Netherlands
- Mennonite Church USA
- Mennonite World Conference
- Missionary Church
- Noah Hoover Mennonite
- Ohio Wisler Mennonite
- Old Order Mennonites
- Reformed Mennonite
- Rosedale Network of Churches
- Swiss Mennonite Conference
- US Conference of Mennonite Brethren Churches

River Brethren

- Brethren in Christ Church
- Old Order River Brethren
- United Zion Church
- Wengerites

Schwarzenau Brethren

- The Brethren Church (Ashland Brethren)
- Church of the Brethren
- Conservative Grace Brethren Churches, International
- Dunkard Brethren
- Ephrata Cloister
- Fellowship of Grace Brethren Churches
- Old Brethren
- Old Brethren German Baptist
- Old German Baptist Brethren
- Old German Baptist Brethren, New Conference
- Old Order German Baptist Brethren

Other Anabaptists

- Abecedarians
- Apostolic Christian Church
- Batenburgers
- Bruderhof
- Charity Christian Fellowship
- Church of the United Brethren in Christ
- Clancularii
- Schwenkfelders

=== Baptist ===
Baptists emerged in 1609 under the teachings of John Smyth, and along with Methodism, grew in size and influence after they sailed to the New World (the remaining Puritans who traveled to the New World were Congregationalists). Some Baptists fit strongly with the Reformed tradition theologically but not denominationally. Some Baptists also adopt presbyterian and episcopal forms of governance. In 2018, there were about 75-105 million Baptists. Of the Baptist demographic, 53 million are part of the Baptist World Alliance as of 2023, the seventh-largest Christian communion.

- Alliance of Baptists
- All-Ukrainian Union of Churches of Evangelical Christian Baptists
- American Baptist Association
- American Baptist Churches USA
- Association of Baptist Churches in Ireland
- Association of Reformed Baptist Churches of America
- Association of Regular Baptist Churches
- Baptist Bible Fellowship International
- Baptist Church of Christ
- Baptist Conference of the Philippines
- Baptist Convention of Ontario and Quebec
- Baptist Convention of Western Cuba
- Baptist Evangelical Christian Union of Italy
- Baptist General Conference of Canada
- Baptist General Conference (Sweden)
- Baptist General Convention of Texas
- Baptist Missionary Association of America
- Baptist Union of Australia
- Baptist Union of Great Britain
- Baptist Union of New Zealand
- Baptist Union of Scotland
- Baptist Union of Western Canada
- Brazilian Baptist Convention
- Canadian Baptist Ministries
- Canadian Convention of Southern Baptists
- Central Baptist Association
- Central Canada Baptist Conference
- Christian Baptist Church of God
- Christian Unity Baptist Association
- Conservative Baptist Association
- Conservative Baptist Association of America
- Continental Baptist Churches
- Convención Nacional Bautista de Mexico
- Convention of Atlantic Baptist Churches
- Convention of Baptist Churches of Northern Circars
- Cooperative Baptist Fellowship
- Council of Baptist Churches in Northeast India
- European Baptist Federation
- Evangelical Baptist Church of Korea
- Evangelical Baptist Mission of South Haiti
- Fellowship of Evangelical Baptist Churches in Canada
- Full Gospel Baptist Church Fellowship
- Fundamental Baptist Fellowship of America
- General Association of Baptists
- General Association of General Baptists
- General Association of Regular Baptist Churches
- General Conference of the Evangelical Baptist Church, Inc.
- General Six-Principle Baptists
- Independent Baptist
  - Independent Baptist Church of America
  - Independent Baptist Fellowship International
  - Independent Baptist Fellowship of North America
  - Interstate & Foreign Landmark Missionary Baptist Association
- International Baptist Convention
- Landmark Baptist Church
- Liberty Baptist Fellowship
- Lott Carey Foreign Mission Convention
- Manipur Baptist Convention
- Myanmar Baptist Convention
- Nagaland Baptist Church Council
- National Association of Free Will Baptists
- National Baptist Convention, Brazil
- National Baptist Convention of America
- National Baptist Convention, USA
- National Baptist Evangelical Life and Soul Saving Assembly of the U.S.A.
- National Missionary Baptist Convention of America
- National Primitive Baptist Convention of the U.S.A.
- Nazareth Baptist Church
- New England Evangelical Baptist Fellowship
- New Independent Fundamentalist Baptist
  - Faithful Word Baptist Church
- Nigerian Baptist Convention
- North American Baptist Conference
- North Bank Baptist Christian Association
- Norwegian Baptist Union
- Old Baptist Union
- Progressive National Baptist Convention
- Regular Baptist Churches, General Association of
- Russian Union of Evangelical Christians-Baptists
- Samavesam of Telugu Baptist Churches
- Separate Baptists in Christ
- Southeast Conservative Baptist
- Southern Baptist Convention
- Southern Baptists of Texas
- Two-Seed-in-the-Spirit Predestinarian Baptists
- Union d'Églises baptistes françaises au Canada
- Union of Christian Baptist Churches in Serbia
- United American Free Will Baptist Church
- United American Free Will Baptist Conference
- United Baptist Convention of the Atlantic Provinces
- Westboro Baptist Church
- World Baptist Fellowship

==== Baptist movements ====
- Bapticostalism
- General Baptist
  - Free Will Baptist
    - United Free Will Baptist
- Holiness Baptists
  - Ohio Valley Association of the Christian Baptist Churches of God
- Independent Baptist
  - New Independent Fundamentalist Baptist
- Kelleyites
- Missionary Baptist
- Progressive Baptist
- Calvinistic (Reformed) Baptist
  - Grace Baptist
  - Primitive Baptist
    - Primitive Baptist Universalism
  - Particular Baptist
  - Strict Baptist
  - Regular Baptist
    - Old Regular Baptist
- Separate Baptists
- Seventh Day Baptists
- Spiritual Baptist
- United Baptist

=== Methodist ===
The Methodist movement emerged out the work of Anglican priest John Wesley, who taught a personal conversion to Christ (the New Birth) and holiness of heart. Calling it "the grand depositum" of the Methodist faith, Wesley specifically taught that the propagation of the doctrine of entire sanctification was the reason that God raised up the Methodists in the world. While some Methodists retained the episcopacy (such as the Free Methodist Church, Global Methodist Church and United Methodist Church), others, such as the Congregational Methodist Church have a congregational polity. Methodists were among the first Christians to accept women's ordination since the Montanists. Some 60-80 million Christians are Methodists, and 33,679,626 were members of the World Methodist Council as of 2024 (the eighth-largest communion). The holiness movement emerged within Methodism in the 19th century. (Note: The vast majority of denominations aligned with the holiness movement are Methodist, with the largest ones belonging to the World Methodist Council, such as the Free Methodist Church, Global Methodist Church, Wesleyan Methodist Church, and the Church of the Nazarene, along with a significant holiness contingent in other Methodist denominations, such as the African Methodist Episcopal Zion Church. The holiness movement did affect other non-Methodist denominations as well, including Anabaptists, Baptists, Quakers and Restorationists; the Brethren in Christ Church is an example of a River Brethren Anabaptist denomination aligned with the holiness movement, while the Central Yearly Meeting of Friends is an example of a Quaker denomination aligned with the holiness movement. For those denominations, see the relevant section, such as those discussing Anabaptism and Quakerism.) As of 2015, churches of the movement had an estimated 12 million adherents. As Methodist denominations have historically preached two works of grace taught by John Wesley, (1) New Birth and (2) entire sanctification, and many denominations aligned with the holiness movement use Methodist in their name, it is difficult to draw a line between Holiness Methodist denominations and those not aligned with the holiness movement. For example, the Free Methodist Church and the Church of the Nazarene are widely regarded as being aligned with the holiness movement and are core members of the World Methodist Council, along with denominations with mixed churchmanship, such as the United Methodist Church.

- African Methodist Episcopal Church
- African Methodist Episcopal Zion Church
- Allegheny Wesleyan Methodist Connection
- Bible Methodist Connection of Churches
- British Methodist Episcopal Church
- Christian Methodist Episcopal Church
- Christ's Sanctified Holy Church
- Church of Christ (Holiness) U.S.A.
- Church of God (Holiness)
- Church of God by Faith
- Church of the Nazarene
- Congregational Methodist Church
- Evangelical Church of the Dominican Republic
- Evangelical Methodist Church
- Evangelical Methodist Church of America
- Fellowship of Fundamental Bible Churches
- First Congregational Methodist Church
- Free Methodist Church
- Fundamental Methodist Conference
- Global Methodist Church
- Holiness Methodist Church
- Methodist Church in Brazil
- Methodist Church in India
- Methodist Church of Fiji and Rotuma
- Methodist Church of Great Britain
- Methodist Church of Malaysia
- Methodist Church of New Zealand
- Methodist Church of Southern Africa
- Primitive Methodist Church
- Southern Methodist Church
- The Salvation Army
- United Methodist Church
- Wesleyan Methodist Church (Brazil)
- Wesleyan Church
  - Wesleyan Methodist Church of Australia

==== Albright Brethren ====
The Albright Brethren were organized under the leadership of Jacob Albright, who converted to Methodism and preached to German-speaking people. Although the majority of the Albright Brethren merged with the United Brethren, two extant bodies continue today:

- Evangelical Church (ECNA)
- Evangelical Association

=== Evening Light ===
Churches of the Evening Light Reformation in 1880 emerged under the direction of Daniel Sidney Warner, and while they emerged under the influence of the holiness movement, they adhere to a position of antidenominationalism. Classified as Holiness Restorationists, the Church of God (Anderson, Indiana) was the original work founded by Warner and its conservative holiness offshoot is the Church of God (Guthrie, Oklahoma). While the Church of God (Restoration) is listed here, it is distinguished from the two aforementioned bodies by unique doctrines that have taken it in a direction of its own.

- Church of God (Anderson, Indiana)
- Church of God (Guthrie, Oklahoma)
- Church of God (Restoration)

=== Keswickian ===
The Higher Life movement emerged in the United Kingdom and emphasized the importance of sanctification, "the deeper and higher life". It became popularized through the Keswick Conventions; W.E. Boardman's Keswickian theology had an influence on A.B. Simpson, who established the Christian and Missionary Alliance.

- Alliance World Fellowship
- Borneo Evangelical Church (SIb Malaysia)
- Christian and Missionary Alliance

=== Quaker ===
Quakers, or Friends, originated under the work of George Fox, who taught personal conversion to Christ, along with the doctrine of Christian perfection. The Friends have historically held that Christians are guided by the inward light to "make the witness of God" known to everyone.

- Conservative Friends
- Central Yearly Meeting of Friends
- Friends United Meeting
- Evangelical Friends Church International
- Friends General Conference
- New Foundation Fellowship
- Britain Yearly Meeting
- Beanite Quakerism
- Hicksite/Orthodox

==== Shaker ====
The United Society of Believers in Christ's Second Appearing was founded by Jane Wardley, Ann Lee, and Lucy Wright in 1747. At present, one active Shaker community remains, the Sabbathday Lake Shaker Village.

=== Plymouth Brethren ===
Plymouth Brethren is a conservative, low church, non-conformist, evangelical Christian movement whose history can be traced to Dublin, Ireland, in the late 1820s, originating from Anglicanism.

- Exclusive Brethren
- Indian Brethren
- Kerala Brethren Assembly
- Open Brethren
- Church Assembly Hall, one of the Chinese Independent Churches
- Gospel Hall Brethren or Gospel Hall Assemblies
- Needed Truth Brethren or The Churches of God

=== Irvingist ===
The Catholic Apostolic churches were born out of the 1830s revival started in London by the teachings of Edward Irving, and out of the resultant Catholic Apostolic Church movement.

- Catholic Apostolic Church
  - New Apostolic Church
    - United Apostolic Church
  - Old Apostolic Church
    - Reformed Old Apostolic Church
  - Restored Apostolic Mission Church

=== Pentecostal and Charismatic ===
Pentecostalism and Charismatic Christianity began in the 1900s. The two movements emphasize direct personal experience of God through baptism with the Holy Spirit. They represent some of the largest growing movements in Protestant Christianity. Pentecostalism is divided between its original branch, Holiness Pentecostalism (which teaches three works of grace) and Finished Work Pentecostalism (which views sanctification only in a progressive manner). Oneness Pentecostalism, which rejects the doctrine of the Holy Trinity, split from Finished Work Pentecostalism and is covered in its own section in this article. The charismatic movement was established within historic denominational traditions due to influence from Pentecostalism, e.g. the Catholic Charismatic Renewal in Roman Catholicism. According to the Pew Research Center, Pentecostals and Charismatics numbered some 280 million people in 2011.

==== Holiness Pentecostalism ====
- Apostolic Faith Church
- Apostolic Overcoming Holy Church of God
- Calvary Holiness Association
- Christ Gospel Churches International
- Church of God (Charleston, Tennessee)
- Church of God (Chattanooga)
- Church of God (Cleveland, Tennessee)
- The Church of God for All Nations
- Church of God (Full Gospel) in India
- Church of God, House of Prayer
- Church of God (Huntsville, Alabama)
- Church of God in Christ
- Church of God (Jerusalem Acres)
- Church of God Mountain Assembly
- Church of God of the Original Mountain Assembly
- Church of God of the Union Assembly
- Church of God of Prophecy
- Church of God with Signs Following
- Congregational Holiness Church
- Deeper Life Bible Church
- Fire Baptized Holiness Church of God of the Americas
- Holiness Baptist Association
- Indonesian Bethel Church
- International Pentecostal Holiness Church
- Mount Sinai Holy Church of America
- Pentecostal Free Will Baptist Church
- Redeemed Christian Church of God
- United Holy Church of America

==== Finished Work Pentecostalism ====
- Apostolic Church
- Apostolic Church of Pentecost
- Apostolic Faith Mission of South Africa
- Assemblies of God
- Associated Brotherhood of Christians
- Brazil for Christ Pentecostal Church
- Celestial Church of Christ
- Christian Church of North America
- Christian Congregation in Brazil
- Christian Congregation in the United States
- CRC Churches International
- Destiny Church
- Elim Pentecostal Church
- Evangelical Pentecostal Church of Besançon
- The Foursquare Church
- Free Apostolic Church of Pentecost
- God Is Love Pentecostal Church
- Igreja Unida
- Independent Assemblies of God, International
- Indian Pentecostal Church of God
- International Assemblies of God Fellowship
- International Fellowship of Christian Assemblies
- International Pentecostal Church of Christ
- Jesus Is Lord Church Worldwide
- Maranatha Christian Church
- New Life Churches
- Open Bible Standard Churches
- Pentecostal Assemblies of Canada
- Pentecostal Assemblies of God of America
- Pentecostal Church in Indonesia
- Pentecostal Church of God
- The Pentecostal Mission
- Potter's House Christian Fellowship
- Revival Centres International
- The Revival Fellowship
- Soldiers of the Cross Church
- United Gospel Tabernacles

==== Charismatics ====
- Bethany Indonesian Church
- Calvary Chapel
- C3 Church Global
- Charisma Christian Church
- Christian Assemblies International
- Christian Open Door Church
- City Harvest Church
- Every Nation
- Hillsong Church
- International Christian Fellowship
- Jesus Army
- Ministries Without Borders
- Sovereign Grace Church
- Wesleyan Methodist Church (Brazil)

==== Neo-charismatic movement ====
- Association of Vineyard Churches
- Bible Christian Mission
- Born Again Movement
- Christ Embassy
- Church on the Rock- International
- Destiny Church Groningen
- El Lugar de Su Presencia
- Fullness of God's Throne Apostolic Church
- International Grace of God Church
- New Life Fellowship Association
- Newfrontiers
- Reborn in Christ Church
- Snowball Church
- Universal Church of the Kingdom of God
- World Church of God's Power

=== Convergence ===
The Convergence Movement originated from "The Chicago Call" in 1977, urging evangelical Protestants to reconnect with the liturgical historic roots of the Christian Church. It emphasizes the convergence of sacramental, evangelical, and charismatic streams; promoting biblical fidelity, creedal identity, and church unity.

- Apostolic Pastoral Congress
- Charismatic Episcopal Church
- Communion of Evangelical Episcopal Churches
- Continuing Evangelical Episcopal Communion
- Evangelical Episcopal Communion
- Holy Communion of Churches
- Union of Charismatic Orthodox Churches

=== Uniting and united ===
These united or uniting churches are the result of a merger between distinct denominational churches (e.g., Lutherans, Anglicans, Presbyterians and the Continental Reformed churches). As ecumenism progresses, unions between various Protestants are becoming more and more common, resulting in a growing number of united and uniting churches. Major examples of uniting churches are the United Protestant Church of France (2013) and the Protestant Church in the Netherlands (2004). Churches are listed here when their disparate heritage marks them as inappropriately listed in the particular categories above.

- China Christian Council
- Church of Bangladesh
- Church of North India
- Church of Pakistan
- Church of South India
- Evangelical Association of Reformed and Congregational Christian Churches
- Evangelical Church of Czech Brethren
- Federation of Evangelical Churches in Italy
- Kiribati Uniting Church (former Congregationalists)
- Protestant Church in Germany
- Protestant Church in the Netherlands
- St. Thomas Evangelical Church of India
- Three-Self Patriotic Movement
- Union of Methodist and Waldensian Churches
- United Church in Jamaica and the Cayman Islands
- United Church in Papua New Guinea and the Solomon Islands
- United Church of Canada
- United Church of Christ
- United Church of Christ in Japan
- United Church of Christ in the Philippines
- United Protestant Church of France
- Uniting Church in Australia

=== Stone–Campbellite ===
Nondenominational Christianity arose in the 18th century through the Stone–Campbell Movement, with followers organizing themselves simply as "Christians" and "Disciples of Christ". (Note: The first nondenominational Christian churches which emerged through the Stone-Campbell Restoration Movement are tied to associations such as the Churches of Christ or the Christian Church (Disciples of Christ).) The Stone–Campbell Movement was led by Barton Stone and Alexander Campbell.

- Christian Church (Disciples of Christ)
- Churches of Christ (non-institutional)
- Churches of Christ in Australia
- Evangelical Christian Church in Canada (Christian Disciples)
- Independent Christian Churches/Churches of Christ
- International Christian Church
- International Churches of Christ

=== Adventism ===
Adventism originated from the work of William Miller, who preached the end of the world and the second coming of Christ in 1843/44. After the Great Disappointment, this year was reinterpreted by Adventists as being the start of the investigative judgment.

- Millerites

Sunday observing

- Advent Christian Church
- Church of the Blessed Hope
- Church of God General Conference

Saturday observing

- Church of God (Seventh-Day)
- Seventh-day Adventist Church

Other Adventist

- Charismatic Adventism
- Creation Seventh Day Adventist Church
- Historic Adventism
- Primitive Advent Christian Church
- Sabbath Rest Advent Church
- Seventh Day Adventist Reform Movement
  - International Missionary Society of Seventh-Day Adventist Church Reform Movement
  - True and Free Seventh-day Adventists
- Shepherd's Rod
  - Branch Davidians
- United Sabbath-Day Adventist Church
- United Seventh-Day Brethren

=== Nondenominational and other Evangelicals ===
The term Evangelical appears with the Reformation and reblossoms in the 18th and 19th centuries. Evangelical Protestantism modernly understood is an inter-denominational Protestant movement which maintains the belief that the essence of the Gospel consists of the doctrine of salvation by grace through faith in Jesus Christ's atonement.

- Adventist Church of Promise
- Associated Gospel Churches of Canada (AGC)
- China Gospel Fellowship
- Christian churches and churches of Christ
- Churches of Christ
- Evangelical Church of the River Plate
- Evangelical Friends Church International
- Fellowship of Independent Evangelical Churches
- Free Church
- Free Evangelical Churches
- Grace Gospel Fellowship
- Great Commission Association
- Israelites of the New Universal Pact
- Jesus Movement

==== International Evangelicalism ====
- Brunstad Christian Church
- LifeChurch.tv

==== African Evangelicalism ====
- Aladura
- Apostles of Johane Maranke
- Christ Community Church
- Evangelical Church of West Africa
- Zion Christian Church

===== P'ent'ay =====
P'ent'ay, simply known as Ethiopian-Eritrean Evangelicalism, are a group of indigenous Protestant Eastern Baptist, Lutheran, Pentecostal, and Mennonite denominations in full communion with each other and believe that Ethiopian and Eritrean Evangelicalism are the reformation of the current Orthodox Tewahedo churches as well as the restoration of it to original Ethiopian Christianity. They uphold that in order for a person to be saved one has to accept Jesus as their Lord and Savior for the forgiveness of sins; and to receive Christ one must be "born again" (dagem meweled). Its members make up a significant portion of the 2 million Eastern Protestant tradition.

- Kale Heywet (Word of Life) Church
- Ethiopian Evangelical Church Mekane Yesus (Place of Jesus)
- Mulu Wongel (Full Gospel Believers) Church
- Meserete Kristos (Christ Foundation) Church
- Assembly of God

=== Eastern Protestant ===
These churches resulted from a post–1800s reformation of Eastern Christianity, in line with Protestant beliefs and practices.

- Believers Eastern Church
- Evangelical Orthodox Church
- Mar Thoma Syrian Church
- St. Thomas Evangelical Church of India

=== Defunct Protestant churches and movements ===
These are protestant denominations, movements and organizations that existed historically, but no longer exist in modern times.

- Amsdorfians
- Anabaptist Ambrosians
- Arrhabonarii
- Berean
- Brownism
- Confessing Church
- Covenanters
- Davidites
- Diggerism
- English Dissenters
- Exovedate
- Fifth Monarchism
- Glasite
- Gnesio-Lutherans
- Haugean movement
- Independents
- Labadism
- Läsare
- Latitudinarians
- Latter Rain
- Laudianism
- Neo-Lutheranism
- Nonconformism
- Nyevangelism
- Old Lighters and New Lighters
  - Old Siders and New Siders
- Old Lutherans
- Osgoodism
- Philadelphianism
  - Zionites (Germany)
- Philippists
- Puritanism
  - Grindletonianism
- Ranterism
- Reveil
- Seekerism
- Shepherding movement
- Shouter movement
- Shtundists

=== Other Protestant churches and movements ===
These are denominations, movements, and organizations deriving from mainstream Protestantism but are not classifiable under historic or current Protestant movements nor as parachurch organizations.

- Amsdorfians
- Apostolic-Prophetic Movement
  - New Apostolic Reformation
- Arminianism
- Amyraldism
- Awakening
- Branhamism
- British New Church Movement
- Confessing Movement
- Cooneyites
- Eternal Sacred Order of Cherubim and Seraphim
  - Aladura movement
- Fangcheng Fellowship
- Free church
- Hyper-Calvinism
- Independent Network Charismatic Christianity
- Laestadianism
- Landmarkism
- Kimbanguist Church
- Kitawala
- Manmin Central Church
- Matswanism
- Metropolitan Community Churches
- Muggletonianism
- Neo-Calvinism
- New Calvinism
- Paleo-orthodoxy
- Remonstrants
- Serpent Handlers
- Social Brethren
- Strong Believers
- Transformational Christianity
- True Jesus Church
- Word of Faith

== Miscellaneous ==
The following are independent and non-mainstream movements, denominations and organizations formed during various times in the history of Christianity by splitting from mainline Catholicism, Eastern or Oriental Orthodoxy, or Protestantism not classified in the previous lists.

=== Christian Identitist ===
- Assembly of Christian Soldiers
- Church of Israel, Schell City, Missouri
- Church of Jesus Christ–Christian (Aryan Nations)
- The Covenant, The Sword, and the Arm of the Lord
- Kingdom Identity Ministries, Harrison, Arkansas

=== Esoteric Christianity ===
- Anthroposophical Society
- Antoinism
- Archeosophical Society
- Christian Kabbalah
- Theosophy
  - Harmony Society
- Christo-Paganism
- Familism
- The Christian Community
- Lectorium Rosicrucianum
- Martinism
- Metropolitan Spiritual Churches of Christ
- The Rosicrucian Fellowship
- Societas Rosicruciana
- Spiritualist Church
- The Order of Christ Sophia
- Universal Alliance
- Universal White Brotherhood

==== Neo-Gnostic ====
- Ecclesia Gnostica
- Ecclesia Gnostica Catholica
- Ecclesia Pistis Sophia
- Gnostic Church of France
- Johannite Church
- The Process Church of The Final Judgment

=== Judeo-Christian ===
==== Messianic Judaism ====
- Assemblies of Yahweh
- Chosen People Ministries
- Hebrew Christian movement
- Hebrew Roots
- International Messianic Jewish Alliance
- Jews for Jesus
- Makuya
- Messianic Jewish Alliance of America
- New Israelites
- Sacred Name Movement
- Union of Messianic Jewish Congregations
- Twelve Tribes communities

=== Nontrinitarian ===
These groups or organizations diverge from historic trinitarian theology (usually based on the Council of Nicaea) with different interpretations of Nontrinitarianism.

==== Bible Students and splinter groups ====
- Christian Millennial Fellowship
- Dawn Bible Students Association
- Friends of Man
- Jehovah's Witnesses
- Laymen's Home Missionary Movement
- Pastoral Bible Institute

==== Christian Science ====
- Church of Christ, Scientist
- Eschatology (religious movement)

==== Latter Day Saint movement ====
Most Latter Day Saint denominations are derived from the Church of Christ established by Joseph Smith in 1830. The largest worldwide denomination of this movement, and the one publicly recognized as Mormonism, is the Church of Jesus Christ of Latter-day Saints. Some sects, known as the "Prairie Saints", broke away because they did not recognize Brigham Young as the head of the church, and did not follow him West in the mid-1800s. Other sects broke away over the abandonment of practicing plural marriage after the 1890 Manifesto. Other denominations are defined by either a belief in Joseph Smith as a prophet or acceptance of the Book of Mormon as scripture. The Latter Day Saints comprise over 17 million members collectively.

- Church of Christ (Latter Day Saints)
- Apostolic United Brethren
- Church of Christ (Temple Lot) (Hedrickites)
- Church of Christ with the Elijah Message
- The Church of Jesus Christ (Bickertonite)
- Church of Jesus Christ (Cutlerite)
- Church of Jesus Christ of Latter Day Saints (Strangite)
- Community of Christ
- Fellowships of the Remnant
- Fundamentalist Church of Jesus Christ of Latter Day Saints (FLDS)
- Humanist and New Order Mormons
- Latter Day Church of Christ (Kingston Clan)
- Remnant Church of Jesus Christ of Latter Day Saints
- Independent RLDS / Restoration Branches
- Restoration Church of Jesus Christ (extinct)
- Restoration Church of Jesus Christ of Latter Day Saints
- Restored Church of Jesus Christ (Eugene O. Walton)
- The Church of Jesus Christ of Latter-day Saints
- The True and Living Church of Jesus Christ of Saints of the Last Days

==== Oneness Pentecostalism ====
- Affirming Pentecostal Church International
- Apostolic Assemblies of Christ
- Apostolic Assembly of the Faith in Christ Jesus
- Apostolic Gospel Church of Jesus Christ
- Apostolic Overcoming Holy Church of God
- Assemblies of the Lord Jesus Christ
- Bible Way Church of Our Lord Jesus Christ
- Church of Our Lord Jesus Christ of the Apostolic Faith
- Church of the Lord Jesus Christ
- Iglesia Evangelica Apostolica del Nombre de Jesus
- Jesus Miracle Crusade
- New Journey Ministries
- Pentecostal Assemblies of Jesus Christ
- Pentecostal Assemblies of the World
- Pentecostal Churches of Christ
- True Jesus Church
- United House of Prayer for All People
- United Pentecostal Church International

==== Swedenborgianism ====
- General Church of the New Jerusalem
- Lord's New Church Which Is Nova Hierosolyma
- Swedenborgian Church of North America

==== Unitarianism and Universalism ====
- American Unitarian Association (consolidated with the Universalist Church of America to form the Unitarian Universalist Association and Unitarian Universalism)
  - Unitarian Universalist Christian Fellowship
- International Council of Unitarians and Universalists
  - General Assembly of Unitarian and Free Christian Churches
    - Unitarian Christian Association
  - Unitarian Church of Transylvania
    - Szekler Sabbatarians
  - Unitarisk Kirkesamfund
- Socinianism
- Polish Brethren
- Unitarian Christian Conference USA
- Unitarian Christian Emerging Church
- Universalist Church of America (consolidated with the American Unitarian Association to form the Unitarian Universalist Association and Unitarian Universalism)

==== Other Nontrinitarians ====
- Christadelphians
- Iglesia ni Cristo (Church of Christ)
- Kingdom of Jesus Christ
- La Luz del Mundo
- Members Church of God International
- Servetism
- Tolstoyan movement
- Two by Twos

=== Chinese salvationist and other East Asian ===
- Chinese Independent Churches
- Christian Tabernacle
- God Worshipping Society
- Good News Mission
- Unification Church
  - Rod of Iron Ministries
- Japanese independent Churches
  - Christ Heart Church
  - Spirit of Jesus Church
- Life Word Mission
- Non-church movement
- Olive Tree
- Providence
- Sanban Puren Pai
- Shincheonji
- Spirit Church (China)
  - Fuhuodao
- The Church of Almighty God
- Victory Altar
- World Mission Society Church of God

=== Southcottist ===
- Jezreelites
- Christian Israelite Church
- House of David (commune)
- Panacea Society

=== Other ===
- Battle Axes
- Buchanism
- Christian Deism
  - Abrahamites
- Albanian-Udi Church
- Family International
- House of Aaron
- International Peace Mission movement
- Kartanoism
- Matchstickism
- Methernitha
- Mita Congregation (USA / Puerto Rico)
- Niscience
- Oneida Community
- Universal Life

== Parachurch ==
Parachurch organizations are Christian faith-based organizations that work outside and across denominations to engage in social welfare and evangelism. These organizations are not churches but work with churches or represent a coalition of churches.

- Action of Churches Together in Scotland
- Byzantine Discalced Carmelites
- Campus Crusade for Christ
- Canadian Council of Churches
- Christian Churches Together in the USA
- Churches Together in Britain and Ireland
- Churches Together in England
- Churches Uniting in Christ
- Conference of European Churches
- Dicastery for Promoting Christian Unity
- Ecumenical Institute for Study and Dialogue
- Edinburgh Churches Together
- Fellowship of Saint Alban and Saint Sergius
- Gideons International
- Global United Fellowship
- Gnostic Society
- Intervarsity Christian Fellowship
- National Council of the Churches of Christ in the U.S.A.
- Pentecostal Charismatic Peace Fellowship
- Reasons to Believe
- Scripture Union
- Servants to Asia's Urban Poor
- Society of Ordained Scientists
- Stand to Reason
- The Gospel Coalition
- The Way International
- World Alliance of Reformed Churches
- World Council of Churches
- World Evangelical Alliance
- World Student Christian Federation
- Young Life
- Youth for Christ
- Youth with a Mission
- Church in Jeddah

== Ideologies ==
A Christian movement is a theological, political, or philosophical interpretation of Christianity that is not necessarily represented by a specific church, sect, or denomination.

- 24-7 Prayer Movement
- American Civil Religion
- Christian atheism
- Christian democracy
  - Distributism
  - Social Credit
- Christian existentialism
- Christian feminism
- Christian humanism
- Christian left
  - Christian anarchism
  - Christian communism
  - Christian socialism
  - Evangelical left
    - Red-Letter Christians
- Christian monasticism
  - Cenobitic monasticism
  - Idiorrhythmic monasticism
  - New Monasticism
- Christian mysticism
  - Christian Edification Society of Jesus
- Christian naturism
- Christian pacifism
- Christian realism
- Christian right
  - Christian fascism
  - Christian reconstructionism
    - Kinism
- Christian vegetarianism
- Christian utopianism
- Continual Prayer Movement
- Convergence Movement
- Countercult Movement
- Cowboy church
- Creationism
  - Old Earth Creationism
  - Young Earth Creationism
  - Evolutionary creationism
  - Neo-Creationism
  - Intelligent design movement
- Dominion theology
  - Christian nationalism
    - Christian Patriot movement
    - Seven Mountain Mandate
  - Integralism
    - Brazilian Integralism
    - Integrism
    - Maurrassisme
- Ecclesiastical separatism
- Emerging Church Movement
- Ethiopian movement
- Green Christianity
- House church (or Simple church)
  - Chinese house churches
- Jesuism
- Jesus movement
  - Shiloh Youth Revival Centers
- Judaizers
- Kingdom theology
- LGBT and denominations
- Liberation theology
  - Black
  - Dalit
  - Latin American
  - Minjung theology
  - Palestinian
- Local Church movement
- Millennialism
  - Amillennialism
  - Postmillennialism
  - Premillennialism
- Neo-orthodoxy
- Neo-revelationism
- New Friars
- Open theism
- Pelagianism
  - Semi-Pelagianism
- Positive Christianity (Nazi)
  - German Christians (movement) (Nazi)
- Postmodern Christianity
  - Postmodern theology
- Process theology
- Progressive Christianity (Liberal Christianity)
- Prosperity theology
- Queer theology
- Quiverfull
- Radical orthodoxy
- Spiritual mapping

=== British Israelism ===
- Armstrongism (Worldwide Church of God)
- British-Israel-World Federation
- Church of God International (United States)
- Intercontinental Church of God
- Living Church of God
- Philadelphia Church of God
- Restored Church of God
- United Church of God
- United Seventh-Day Brethren

== Syncretic ==
The relation of these movements to other Christian ideas can be remote. They are listed here because they include some elements of Christian practice or beliefs, within religious contexts which may be only loosely characterized as Christian.

=== African diaspora religions ===
African diaspora religions are a number of related religions that developed in the Americas in various nations of the Caribbean, Latin America and the Southern United States. They derive from traditional African religions with some influence from other religious traditions, notably Christianity and Islam. Examples incorporating elements of Christianity include but are not limited to:

- Candomblé
- Rastafari
- Santería
- Santo Daime
- Umbanda
- Voodoo
  - Brazilian Vodum
    - Tambor de Mina, a syncretic religion that developed in northern Brazil
  - Cuban Vodú
  - Dominican Vudú
  - Haitian Vodou
  - Hoodoo
  - Louisiana Voodoo

=== New Thought ===
The relation of New Thought to Christianity is not defined as exclusive; some of its adherents see themselves as solely practicing Christianity, while adherents of Religious Science say "yes and no" to the question of whether they consider themselves to be Christian in belief and practice, leaving it up to the individual to define oneself spiritually.

- Church of Divine Science
- Church of the Truth
- Home of Truth
- The Infinite Way
- Psychiana
- Religious Science
- Seicho-no-Ie
- Unity Church
- Universal Foundation for Better Living

=== Other syncretists ===
Other Christian or Christian-influenced syncretic traditions and movements include:

- Alleluia church
- Aymara spirituality
- Bedwardism
- Braucherei
- Bwiti (Some sects)
- Burkhanism
- Cao Đài
- Chrislam
- Christian ashram movement
- Christopaganism
  - Christian Wicca
- Cults of many folk saints such as Santa Muerte and Maximón
- Dōkai
- Figurism
- Folk Christianity
  - Cunning folk tradition
    - Latter Day Saint cunning folk tradition
  - Folk Catholicism
  - Folk Orthodoxy
- Ghost Dance
- Holy Spirit Movement
- Indian Shakers
- Kakure Kirishitans
- Legio Maria
- Lisu Christianity
- Longhouse Religion
- Lumpa Church
- Mama Tata
- Modekngei
- Native American Church
- Pai Mārire and other syncretic Māori religions
- Pilgrims of Arès
- Pomio Kivung
- Raramuri religion
- Rizalista religious movements
- Sinochristianity
- Ubuntu
- Xueta Christianity
- Yaqui religion

Historical movements with strong syncretic influence from Christianity but no active modern membership include

- Antonianism
- God Worshipping Society
- Pulahan

== See also ==
- Christian theology
- Denominationalism
- East–West Schism
- Eastern Christianity
- List of heresies in the Catholic Church
- List of Christian denominations by number of members
- List of Christian movements
- List of current Christian leaders
- List of the largest Protestant denominations
- List of religions and spiritual traditions
- List of religious organizations
- Religious Orders
- Timeline of Christianity
- Western Christianity
- Church architecture
