= United Free Will Baptist =

A United Free Will Baptist is a member of either of two African-American Free Will Baptist denominations: the United American Free Will Baptist Church or the United American Free Will Baptist Conference.

Free Will Baptists can be found in America as early as 1727, in connection with the labors of Paul Palmer in the Carolinas. Both slaves and free blacks became members of the predominantly white Free Will Baptist churches in the south. The first black minister ordained by the Free Will Baptists was Robert Tash, who was ordained by the General Conference in 1827 The first separate black congregation of Free Will Baptists was organized in North Carolina in 1867. The main strength of the two bodies remains on the eastern seaboard from North Carolina to Florida.

- Free Will Baptist History
