= Primitive Christianity =

Primitive Christianity, Primitive Christian, or Primitive Church may refer to:

- Early Christianity, up to the First Council of Nicaea in 325 AD
  - Christianity in the 1st century
- Christian primitivism, or Restorationism, later movements intended to restore the practices and beliefs of the first Christians
- In the names of particular restorationist denominations:
  - Primitive Baptists, began early 19th century
  - Primitive Methodist Church, began early 19th century
  - Primitive Advent Christian Church, 1860 split from the Advent Christian Church
  - Primitive Church of Jesus Christ (Bickertonite), 1914 split from the Mormon Church of Jesus Christ (Bickertonite)
  - Johannite Church of Primitive Christians, 1804 Gnostic group

Primitive church may also refer to:

- Church architecture § Beginnings
- List of oldest church buildings

== See also ==
- Radical Reformation
