= St Columba's-by-the-Castle =

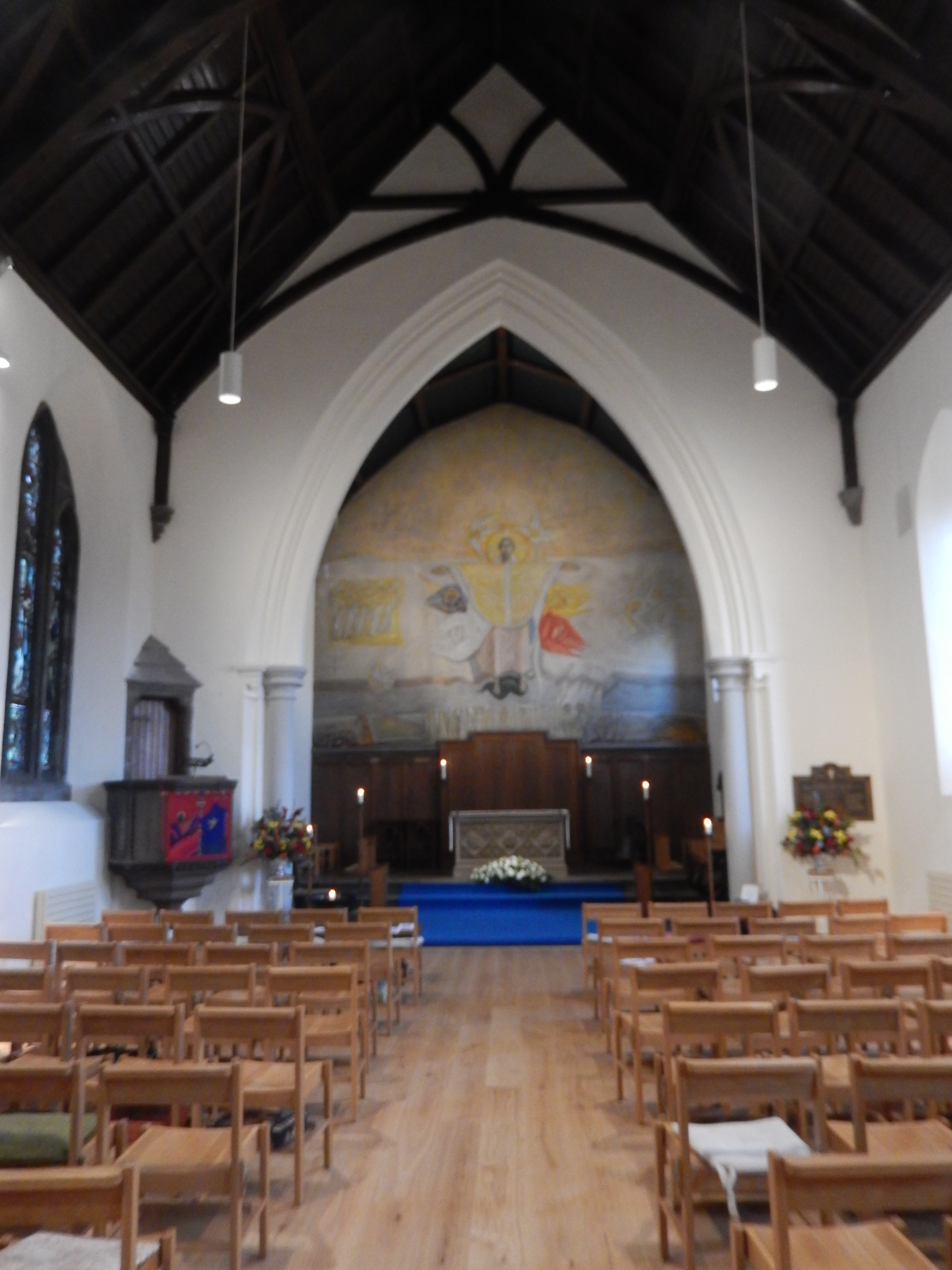
- St Columba's-by-the-Castle
- 55.948314°N 3.195499°W
- Denomination: Scottish Episcopal Church
- Website: stcolumbasbythecastle.org.uk

History
- Dedication: Saint Columba

Architecture
- Functional status: Active
- Heritage designation: Category B listed
- Designated: 12 December 1974
- Completed: 1847

Clergy
- Rector: The Revd Juliet Stephenson

St Columba's-by-the-Castle is a congregation of the Scottish Episcopal Church in central Edinburgh, Scotland. The church is located close to Edinburgh Castle, on the south slope of Castle Hill, and is protected as a category B listed building.

The church was constructed in 1846–1847 in an Early English Gothic style, to designs by architect John Henderson. Stone for the building was brought from the palace of Mary of Guise, 16th-century queen regent of Scotland, on the Royal Mile. Its layout was inspired by the reforms of Anglican worship arising from the Oxford Movement.

St Columba's-by-the-Castle is part of a local ecumenical partnership (LEP) with Greyfriars Tolbooth & Highland Kirk (Church of Scotland) and Augustine United Church (United Reformed Church). It is also part of Edinburgh Churches Together and Action of Churches Together in Scotland.

During the Edinburgh Festival Fringe it has been used by the promoter C venues as a venue.

== See also ==
- Diocese of Edinburgh
