= Unida (disambiguation) =

Unida is a Spanish adjective meaning "joined, united" and may refer to:

- Unidá, Asturian federation of parties formed by Izquierda Asturiana
- Unida, American stoner rock band formed after the dissolution of Kyuss and Slo Burn
- Club Atlético Juventud Unida Universitario, football club from San Luis in San Luis Province, Argentina
- Esperanza Unida, Inc., non-profit that represents Latino workers in worker's and unemployment compensation hearings
- Esquerda Unida, Galician left wing political and social movement
- Igreja Metodista Unida, one of the largest Protestant denominations in Mozambique
- Igreja Unida, Pentecostal evangelical church in São Paulo, Brazil
- Izquierda Unida (disambiguation), eight pages of this name
- Juventud Unida de Gualeguaychú, Argentine Football club
- Juventud Unida de San Miguel, Argentine Football club
- La Raza Unida Party, United States third political party
