= Fuhuodao =

New religious movement in China

Fuhuodao (复活道 Resurrection Way) is a new religious movement in the People's Republic of China. It has been founded in Henan by Guo Guangxu and Wen Qiuhui in 1990. It is active in Anhui, as well and is a fork of Linglingjiao.

== See also ==
- Eastern Lightning
- Spirit Church (China)
