= Presbyterian Church in Honduras =

The Presbyterian Church in Honduras was founded in 1960, by the National Evangelical Presbyterian Church of Guatemala. Presbyterian settlers come to Honduras and asked the Presbyterian Church in Honduras to send missionaries. The first church was formed in Guimaca. There are dozens of congregations within 150 km of Tegucigalpa. The church recognise the Westminster Confession of Faith, the Heidelberg Catechism, the Apostles Creed, and Nicene Creed. The congregations are small in size, and very poor.
