= Ann Ree Colton =

American writer

- Born: Ann Ree Whitaker; August 17, 1898; Georgia, U.S.
- Died: June 28, 1984 (aged 85); Glendale, California, U.S.

Ann Ree Colton (August 17, 1898 – June 28, 1984) was an American religious figure, co-founder of the Ann Ree Colton Foundation of Niscience, a New Age religious sect described as a cult by its former adherents.

== Biography ==
Colton was born in Georgia as Ann Ree Whitaker, the daughter of Emory Achilles Whitaker and Harriet Elizabeth Mitchell. Colton was billed as a "mother-teacher" when she was head of the First Church of Corinthian Brotherhood in Florida in the 1930s and 1940s. She was a minister of the Chapel of Jesus Ethic, and with her husband Jonathan Murro founded Niscience in 1953. She published an autobiography, Prophet of the Archangels, recommending meditation and healing techniques, and "dimensional contemplation."

Colton was married several times, first to Alexander Taranko in 1916; they had two daughters, Harriette and Ann. Her usual surname came from a husband named Albert Leo Colton, whom she married in 1936. She married Rudolph Blumberg in 1939; they divorced in 1949. She was married to Llewis Trubey when she spoke at an events in California in the early 1950s. She married her last husband, Jonathan Murro, in California in 1953. Murro continued to run their foundation after Colton's death in 1984, until his death by suicide in 1991.
