= Arabici =

The Arabici (meaning "Arabians") were a small Christian sect of the 3rd century. The name of their founder is lost to history. Augustine of Hippo labelled them "Arabici" in the belief that this sect flourished in Arabia. Other sources referred to them occasionally as Thnetopcychitae (Ancient Greek: θνητοψυχῖται) or Thanatopsychitae (meaning "(believers in) the death of the soul").

The Arabici believed the soul was to perish with the body, though both soul and body would be revived again on Judgement Day. The Arabici theorized this from their study of I Tim., vi, 16, "Who only hath immortality." This passage, they held, ascribes immortality to God alone, and therefore prevents its possession by man. The Arabici were condemned on a council in 250 AD, where it said Origen preached against their view and converted the present Arabici back.

== See also ==
- Soul sleep
