= United Gospel Tabernacles =

Non-denominational Christian fellowship

United Gospel Tabernacles is a non-denominational fellowship, most closely associated with the Pentecostal faith of the Christian religion. It is a missions based fellowship, currently operating in North America, South America, Europe, and Africa. The most prominent of these nations are: the United States of America, Mexico, Italy, and Nigeria.

United Gospel Tabernacles does not keep church rolls, but estimated attendance as of their 2006 business meeting in June, was over 2,000,000 worldwide. The exact number of churches in the United States is not certain, but estimates are over fifty, nationwide. United Gospel Tabernacles is also closely affiliated with International Bible Center, an unaccredited school of Biblical studies, in San Antonio, Texas.

== History ==
The United Gospel Tabernacles has its roots in a group of fundamentalist style revivals in Texas in the early 1930s. The first of these revivals was held in Beaumont, Texas by Rev. Harry Hodge, an evangelist. Rev. Hodge continued to hold revivals all across Texas, eventually establishing many churches across the state.

As these churches had been founded independently of any current denominations, Rev. Hodge felt it necessary to bind these churches together under a common banner. With the help of his good friend, the Texas Secretary of State, Rev. Hodge organized one of the first tax-exempt religious organization of its kind in the state.

== Doctrine ==
The United Gospel Tabernacles hold to classic Pentecostal doctrines. UGT is a Trinitarian denomination that holds the Bible as the sole authority or Sola Scriptura. Ordinances recognized by the denomination are Baptism and Communion. Baptism is to be administered by a licensed or ordained minister of the Gospel, by full immersion, in the name of the Father, Son, and Holy Spirit. Communion is practiced as an act of remembrance. They reject the doctrines of infant baptism and the Real Presence of Christ in the Eucharist. Also significant to their doctrine is the belief in the gifts of the Holy Spirit including the gifts of speaking in tongues, interpretation of tongues, prophecy, and divine healing.

== Structure ==
The United Gospel Tabernacles allows each church to operate autonomously within the organization. Each district has a Superintendent, usually based upon state/territorial lines. Each pastor is expected to report to their respective superintendents, who then report to the President of the organization.

Each year a convention is attended by all the pastors within the denomination. It is during this convention that all matters concerning the denomination are voted upon. A simple two-thirds majority decides any decisions upon the voting table. Every fourth convention, a vote is cast for who will serve as President and Vice-President of the denomination for the next term, as well as District Superintendents. There are no limit to the amount of terms that may be served.
