= Bogomoljci =

Association of Serbian Orthodox Church members

The Bogomoljci (Bogomoljački pokret / Богомољачки покрет) was a charismatic and evangelical association of lay Serbian Orthodox Church believers that existed, primarily, during the Interwar period. Though a sizeable and significant movement at its peak, it was largely destroyed during and after the Second World War. While some remnants and "Neo-Bogomoljci" groups appeared in the Post-war period, all lack the number of worshipers and importance of the original movement.

== Etymology ==
Bogomoljci is the plural form of Bogomoljac, a compound of the Serbian words Bog (God) and Moliti (to pray).

The few English sources on Bogomoljci generally translate it as "The God Worshiper Movement," but following its adoption by the Church in 1920 it became formally known as the "People's Christian Community" (Narodna hrišćanska zajednica / Народна хришћанска заједница).

== History ==
=== Background and Origins Prior to the First World War ===
In the 1840s a group of German speaking Hungarian students became converts to the Protestant Anabaptist Apostolic Christian Church (Nazarene) after encountering Samuel Heinrich Fröhlich in Zurich. As they returned to Budapest they brought the religion with them and converted others. In the years that followed the so-called "Nazarene" religion would become one of the fastest spreading religions throughout the Hungarian half of the Austrian Empire and subsequently to the Principality of Serbia. This growth, and consequent loss of membership, alarmed the Orthodox clergy in these regions, yet they failed to respond in any meaningful way. For example, in 1882, the same year the Kingdom of Serbia was founded, Reverend Rev. Ljubomir Panic of western Vojvodina, one of the possible regions from which the Bogomoljci may have begun, called the spread of the Nazarene "alarming," and further beckoned the Church hierarchy to oppose them, a call that was not responded to.

Rather than forming from within the Church, the Bogomoljci originated amongst lay Serbian Orthodox believers in the 1870s-1890s. Aleksandra Djurić Milovanović,and Radmila Radić specifically trace the movement's origins to believers called "crkvari" who spent the years following the Serbian-Ottoman Wars excavating the foundations of old churches in south-eastern Serbia. Yet Nemanja S. Mrdjenovic and Bojan Aleksov trace their origins to farmers and villages in Serbian Banat/Vojvodina, linking them to a movement simply called "The Pious" and led by the farmer, church sexton and pilgrim to the Holy Land, Vitomir Maletin (1826–1873). Maletin experienced mystical visions and distributed literature about them to neighboring villages, he also rallied against the Nazarenes and gained fame amongst his fellow simple folk. These early Bogomoljci were without coordination or structure, thus practices varied widely amongst them as the autonomous religious movement spread. Worshipers were said to: dress modestly and even go barefoot, refer to one another as "brother" and "sister", gather at local shrines, take pilgrimages to local holy sites, join to celebrate feast days, sing hymns (in both the vernacular and Church-Slavonic), read and interpreted the Bible amongst themselves, eschew vices (alcohol, tobacco, etc.), medical care and courts, fast and abstained from certain foods (some simply dropped pork, others meat entirely). All this was done so as to open up a more, Protestant-esque, personal connection to the Church and to God. Importantly, this was mostly done only amongst fellow worshipers also, without a member of the clergy present. In these early days the Church was ambivalent to movement; the clergy noticed the movement and began to discuss it but took no overall efforts to aid or impede it, a status quo that would change following the Great War.

=== The First World War and Church Control ===
The War turned out to be a boon for the growth of the movement as its rituals, such as praying outside military camps at night, brought more attention to it, and attracted soldiers to join. Even the highest echelons of military authority became aware of it, as shown by an April 25, 1918 order from the Supreme Command of the Serbian Army ordering the movement be investigated as to whether it was a "heresy." After determining it was not, they allowed "brothers" of the movement to serve as any other soldier.

Ultimately WW1 brought not only massive population loss in the Kingdom of Serbia but also its transformation to the larger Kingdom of Yugoslavia, a move which meant that while Orthodox Serbs were still the largest percentage of the population (40%) they were no longer the default. This resulted in the Bogomoljci transforming also, becoming more evangelical than before now that they had to contest with more than just the Nazarenes. This was not the only change to come to the movement in these years, as Spiritualist ideas, popular in the post war years, also become intertwined with the movement. These ideas were not wholly without basis in the movement as Vitomir Maletin had mystical visions and ideas, rather these strains were amplified and synchronized with Orthodox ideas, the mystical and Spiritist thought of figures such as Leo Tolstoy, Sir Oliver Lodge, and Russian Thesophists, among others.

These changes in Bogomoljci, its massive growth in the desperate times of the post-war and the Church's decrease in authority in its new state contributed to a renewed focus on the movement. Initially the idea of anathematizing believers was considered but the young bishop of Eparchy of Ohrid (later Ohrid and Bitola) Nikolaj Velimirović, a controversial figure who was no stranger to mystical ideas, opposed this idea. Thus it was decided that he would attempt to take leadership of this lay movement, to unify, formalize and bring it in line with Church approved orthodoxy, and incorporate into the church. In August 1920 Velimirovic went to a Bogomoljci conference at St George Monastery in Krnjevo to begin this task. That same year Velimirovic established a headquarters for this Bogomoljci conversion process in Kragujevac, a place that could provide theological training, missionary preparation, and official recognition of preachers. Alongside this it also worked as a printing and publishing house, that would print millions of publications during the interwar years. At the time there were roughly 500 branches with at least 100,00 members of the movement in just Vojvodina, Serbia and north-eastern Bosnia.

Within just the first year of this process Velimirovic was able to take away control of the movement from a significant portion of its lay leaders, and bring the majority of its followers into his, and the Church's, fold. This process involved not gaining the followers but bringing the lay leaders under him, figures such as the theological student, and later Serbian Orthodox bishop, Dragoljub Milivojević, whom would later become editor for one of the journals associated with Velimirovic's conversion process, Sabornici. This portion of the movement would be formalized into the church under the "People's Christian Community" (PCC) moniker. During this conversion process Velimirovic purged this section of the movement of many of its early elements, to include its less hierarchical, its overtly piety, and its spiritualist elements. The remaining spiritist sections of Bogomoljci formed into clusters known as “Savez bratstava pravoslavnih hriscana” (The Federation of Orthodox Christian Brotherhoods).

Yet even after Nikolaj's centralization and attempts to purge the movement of spiritualism and heresy remnants of Bogomoljci's origin remained, as members continue to sing and publish Nazarene hymns, practice pietistic fanatical elements, and believe in some of the folk religious elements. What Nikolaj did accomplish was in making PCC member's bow down to church hierarchy along with inciting a streak of monasticism and ethno-nationalism in the movement. The former is shown by the uptake in members seeking monastic life, especially amongst women in the movement, at times whole families would take up monastic life. The later in how firmly the movement identified not with universal Christendom, but with a specifically Serbian identity more than anything else, as was true for their new leader. Even after Nikolaj's takeover of the movement many Serbian Orthodox bishops continued to look upon the movement unfavorable due to these "heretical" and "crypto-Protestant" elements.

Bogomoljci meetings and events took place in a variety of Serbian monasteries during this period:

- 1923 at the Monastery of Saint Roman in 1923
- 1924 at the Jošanica monastery in Jagodina
- 1925 First pilgrimage to Mt. Athos
- 1926 at the PCC headquarters in Kragujevac
- 1929 at the Rakovica Monastery in Belgrade

As this status quo calcified over the years that followed in 1931 at a Bogomoljci Assembly the PCC forcible merged with FOCB, and promptly ousted remaining dedicated spiritist to include the former friend of collaborator of Milivojevic, Milan Bozoljac who was the leader of the FOCB at the time and previously the state treasurer for Jagodina. Bozoljac and Milivojevic had previously worked together on the Bogomoljci journal Sabornici but since 1930 had been trading barbs with one another over each other's spiritualist inclinations, or lack therefore of. During these Bozoljac revealed that Milivojevic continued to practice mediumship, thus when Milivojevic attempted a, failed, coup on the PCC in 1932 Nikolaj used this to eject him from the movement. From which point Milivojevic would go on to finish theological school and in 1939 be elected to the only Serbian Orthodox bishopric outside of Yugoslavia.

=== The Second World War and Subsequent Downfall ===
Following the defeat and occupation of the Kingdom of Yugoslavia by the Axis powers in 1941, PCC was outlawed and in 1944 its head Bishop Nikolaj was put on house arrest by the Nazis. Ironically prior to this Adolf Hitler had given an award to Nikolaj in 1934, Nikolaj had made positive references to Hitler in a speech and maintained ties with Nazi aligned nationalist and fascist figures in Yugoslavia such as Dimitrije Ljotić.
