= Apostolic Overcoming Holy Church of God =

Christian church in Ethiopia

The Apostolic Overcoming Holy Church of God was founded in 1916 as the Ethiopian Overcoming Holy Church of God by the late Bishop W.T. Phillips in Mobile, Alabama. The Church was locally incorporated on July 14, 1920.

Believing that God’s message was to all people on April 1, 1941, the church changed its name and was incorporated in the State of Alabama as the Apostolic Overcoming Holy Church of God. The church spread to many parts of the United States and into foreign territories.

Bishop Phillips led the church successfully for 57 years. He died on November 24, 1973, and Senior Bishop Jasper Roby served as the National Presider until May 2000. In June 2000, Bishop George W. Ayers, Ph.D. was voted by the Executive board as the National/International Presiding Prelate. His position was reaffirmed in June 2002 and he served faithfully until his death in 2015. His position was succeeded by Bishop John H. Matthews, who currently serves.

The church presently has missionaries serving Western, Southwest and Southeast Africa.

The local churches are united under districts, which are governed by overseers and district or diocesan bishops. The Annual Meeting called "Pentecost" convenes each year on June 1–10.

Birmingham, Alabama, is the home of the church headquarters. Since 2011 it has been located at the Cathedral of the Cross A.O.H. Church of God at 1480 CenterPoint Parkway Birmingham, AL 35215.

The Apostolic Overcoming Holy Church of God proclaims it is set upon the foundation laid by Jesus Christ and the Apostles following (non-Trinitarian) Oneness-Pentecostal doctrine. It believes that the work that Christ began must be continued to bring humanity to complete reconciliation with God.
