= New England Evangelical Baptist Fellowship =

The New England Evangelical Baptist Fellowship (NEEBF) was organized in Kennebunk, Maine on January 2, 1844¹. In 2001, there were 10 churches located in Maine, Massachusetts, and New Hampshire with a possible membership of 600. The NEEBF holds quarterly sessions. They have thirteen articles of faith, advocating beliefs which include the inspiration of the Bible, the deity of Jesus, general atonement, local church autonomy, and premillennialism. G. Richard Mountfort serves as President (2001).

== Sources ==
- Encyclopedia of American Religions, J. Gordon Melton, editor
- For Your Enrichment (a brochure of the NEEBF)
- Profiles in Belief: the Religious Bodies of the United States and Canada, by Arthur Carl Piepkorn

== Footnotes ==
1. Profiles in Belief is apparently in error when it says that the New England Evangelical Baptist Fellowship was organized in the 1940s by Congregational-Christian Churches that preferred not to become a part of the United Church of Christ. Perhaps this group was confused with the National Association of Congregational Christian Churches. The Fellowship's brochure gives the 1844 organizational date.
