= Valesians =

2nd century Christian sect

The Valesians were a Christian sect that advocated self-castration. The sect was founded by Valens, an Arabian philosopher who established the sect sometime in the second century AD. They were notorious for forcibly castrating travelers whom they encountered and guests who visited them.

They are known chiefly from the Panarion of Epiphanius of Salamis, which describes how disciples of the sect were not allowed to eat meat until they had been castrated, because those who are not castrated might be tempted to lust by eating certain foods. According to the Panarion, their views on authorities and powers were similar to those of Sethianism or of the Archontics.

Their doctrine was condemned as heresy by the Synod of Achaia in approximately 250 AD. The sect appears in The Temptation of Saint Anthony by Flaubert.

== See also ==
- Skoptsy, a Russian sect advocating the same ideas
