= Barallot =

Former Christian denomination

The Barallots were a sect, deemed heretical, at Bologna in Italy, who had all things in common, even their wives and children. They gave so readily into all manner of sensual pleasures, that they were also termed Compliers.
