= Southeast Conservative Baptist =

Southeast Conservative Baptists (more properly Southeast Conservative Baptist Association) is one of nine regional associations fellowshipping with the Venture Church Network. This region consists of Alabama, Arkansas, Georgia, South Carolina, Florida, Kentucky & Grand Bahama, and is a developing region outside of the geographical center of Conservative Baptists. The regional office is located in Kissimmee, Florida.
