= Amsdorfians =

Early Protestant group against good works

The Amsdorfians were an early sect of Protestant Christians, who took their name from the 16th-century German reformer Nicolaus von Amsdorf. They maintained that good works were not only unprofitable, but obstacles, to salvation. The Amsdorfians were rigid confessionists.
