= Free Evangelical Churches =

Communion of Greek churches

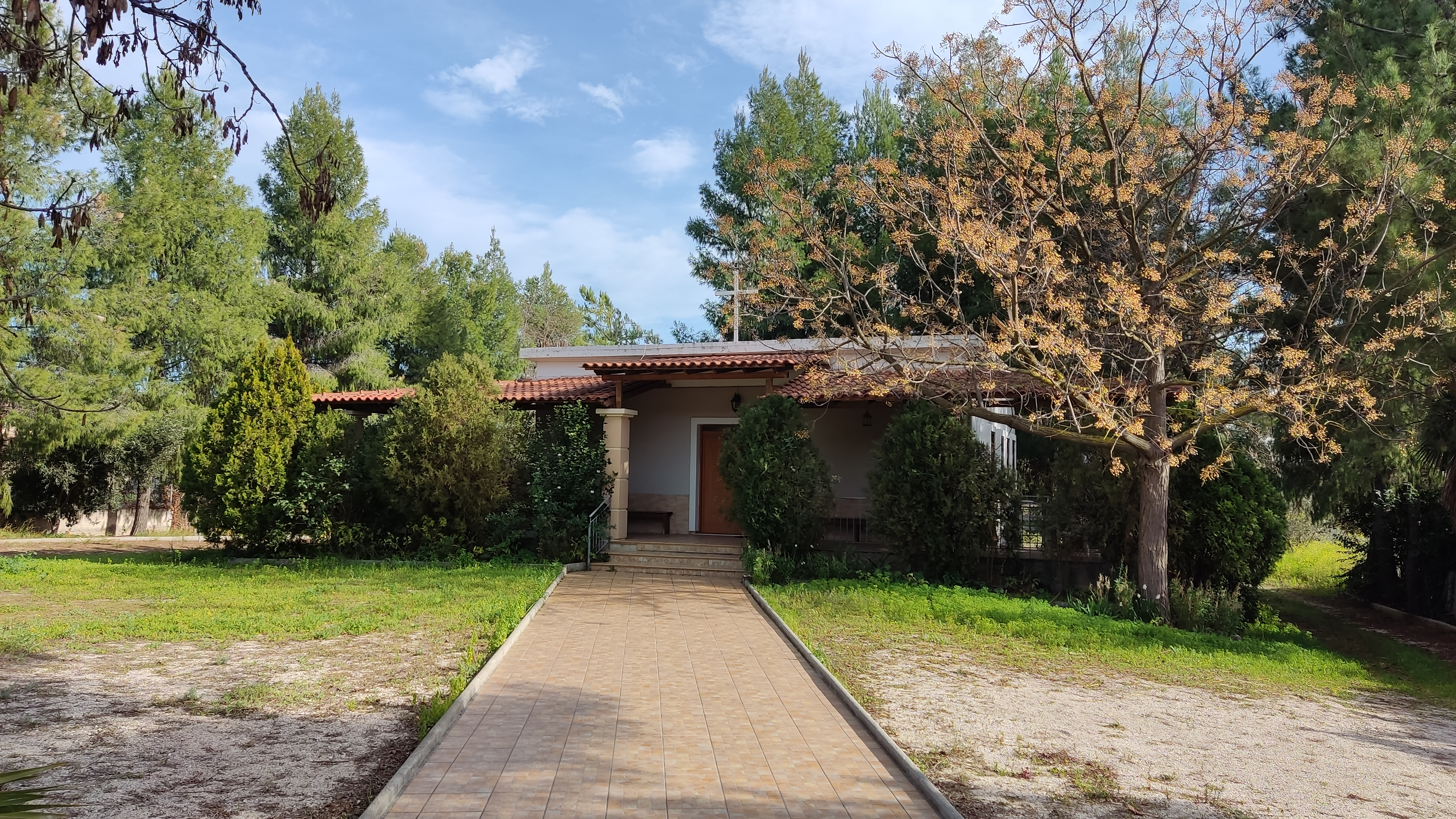
Free Evangelical Church in Argos, Peloponnese

Free Evangelical Churches (Greek: Κοινωνία Ελεύθερων Ευαγγελικών Εκκλησιών Ελλάδας, ΚΕΕΕΕ) is a communion of over 60 regional Evangelical free churches in Greece. The great majority of the churches are known as the Free Evangelical Church. Free Evangelical Churches are classified as Baptists and Plymouth Brethren. There are 3 Greek Free Evangelical Churches in Australia and 2 in Canada.

== History ==
The Free Evangelical Church was founded from a conjunction of various Protestant churches in Greece. This effort was begun in 1886 in Chania, Crete by two English women who worked in the UK Consulate of Chania. At the same time in Athens the Church of Christian Brethren was founded by the Irishman Henry Devine. A second church was created in Patras by Theofanis Zaferopoulos, which got help from Swiss Open Brethren. In 1911 Athanasios Katsarkas founded churches in Komotini and Andrianoupolis, while in 1914 they were transported to Thessalonica, and afterwards they also expanded into other regions. In Athens the main worker of the Free Evangelical Church was Kostas Metallinos. It is believed that Kostas Metallinos was the main founder of the Communion.
