= Bagnolians =

The Bagnolians were a sect in the 8th century, deemed heretical, who rejected the Old Testament and part of the New Testament. They held the world to be eternal, and affirmed that God did not create the soul, when he infused it into the body. They derived their name from Bagnols, a city in Languedoc, France. Their doctrine generally agreed with that of the Manicheans.

== See also ==
- Manichaeism
- Marcionism
