= Adelophagi =

Early Christian sect

Adelophagi (from the Greek terms ἄδηλος adelos "secretly," and φάγω phago "I eat") were a Christian sect mentioned by the anonymous author known as Praedestinatus. They believed that a Christian ought to eat only in private.

The sect's beliefs were based on references to the Old Testament:

But the man of God said to the king, "If you were to give me half of your house, I would not go in with you; nor would I eat bread nor drink water in this place. For so it was commanded my by the word of the LORD, saying, 'You shall not eat bread, nor drink water, nor return by the same way you came.'"

— 1 Kings 13:8-9

Sigh in silence, make no mourning for the dead; bind your turban on your head, and put your sandals on your feet; do not cover your lips, and do not eat man's bread of sorrow.

— Ezekiel 24:17

It is unclear whether they ate entirely in private, or simply refrained from eating in the presence of members of other sects.

Philastrius suggests that they also rejected the divinity of the Holy Ghost. They seem to have flourished in the latter part of the fourth century, circa 350 AD.
