= Old Brethren German Baptist =

Christian Confession

The Old Brethren German Baptists, also called Leedyites, are the most conservative group of Schwarzenau Brethren. They live in Indiana and Missouri.

== History ==
=== Origins in Germany ===
The history of the Old Brethren German Baptists dates back to 1708, when the Schwarzenau Brethren were formed in Schwarzenau, now part of Berleburg under the leadership of Alexander Mack. Soon they moved to Pennsylvania to escape religious persecution in Europe.

=== Early history ===
For the history of the Old Brethren German Baptist Brethren before the division see Old German Baptist Brethren: History.

=== The divisions of the early 1880s ===
In 1860s and '70s the traditionalists among the Brethren opposed the adoption of innovations such as revival meetings, Sunday schools, and foreign missionary work. Stressing church discipline, Annual Meetings, and the preservation of the "older order" of church ordinances, worship, and dress, they formed the Old German Baptist Brethren in 1881.

=== Old Order divisions ===
In 1913 conservative members of the Old German Baptist Brethren centered around Camden, Carroll County, Indiana (Deer Creek), withdrew from their church and formed the Old Brethren. In 1915 the same happened among the Brethren centered around Salida, Stanislaus County, California. In 1921, the Old Order German Baptist Brethren, centered around Dayton, Ohio, broke with the Old German Baptist Brethren.

Attempts in 1929 and 1930 to reunite the Old Brethren and the Old German Baptist Brethren were unsuccessful. The Old Brethren subsequently divided into two groups. The more conservative of the two groups, centered in Camden, Indiana, was organized in 1939 and took the name Old Brethren German Baptists. Some members of the Old Order German Baptist Brethren joined them.

Melton's Encyclopedia of American Religions describes the emergence of the Old Brethren German Baptists:

Around 1930 members of the Old Brethren Deer Creek congregation near Camden, Indiana, began to fellowship with the Old Order Brethren in the Covington, Ohio, area. However, by 1935 the traditionalist Old Brethren found themselves unable to continue their affiliations with the Ohio Brethren. They continued as an independent congregation until they made contact with a few Old Order Brethren near Bradford, Ohio, who met in the home of Solomon Lavy. In 1939 the two groups merged and adopted the name Old Brethren German Baptist Church. They were joined in 1953 by a group of Old Order Brethren from Arcanum, Ohio.

The Old Brethren German Baptists are the result of three subsequent departures of conservatives among the German Baptists between 1881 and 1939.

== Beliefs and practices ==
Old Brethren German Baptists differ from their predecessor groups by stricter adherence to traditions, such as the use of horse and buggy, instead of automobiles, as a means of transportation. They also use neither electricity nor telephones. Production and use of tobacco, acceptance of pensions, and insurances on life and property are also ruled out.

They are distinct from the Old Order German Baptist Brethren, another group with similar traditions that split off from the Old German Baptist Brethren in 1921. The Old Brethren German Baptists farm with horses, while the Old Order German Baptists use tractors and other motorized equipment in their farming.

Many families are engaged in agriculture, growing produce and producing sorghum syrup.

Annual meetings are held at Pentecost. In the past it was in a meetinghouse near Camden, Indiana. As of 2016, annual meetings are alternating between Camden, Indiana, and the new settlement in Missouri.

In spite of the name, Old Brethren German Baptists do not use the German language anymore, neither a German dialect in everyday life nor Standard German for Bible and church as Old Order Amish and many Old Order Mennonites do. Old Brethren German Baptists had already given up the use of the German language when the first split of conservatives from the main body occurred in the early 1880s.

== Members and congregations ==
Around 1980, the Old Brethren German Baptists had three congregations and 45 members in 28 households. The largest congregation was at Camden, Indiana, followed by a congregation at Goshen, Indiana. The smallest congregation was at Arcanum, Ohio.

Around 2015, the group has grown to about 130 members. Camden, Indiana, is still the main settlement. The church at Arcanum, Ohio, does not exist anymore and the congregation at Goshen, Indiana, is down to two elderly members, but there is a new settlement between Trenton and Spickard, Missouri. This group has many members who came from the car-driving Old German Baptist Brethren and who withdrew over concerns about a perceived slide to modernity in their church.

== Similar groups ==
Beyond the groups they divided from, there are some similarities between the Old Brethren German Baptists and Old Order Amish and also the horse and buggy groups among the Old Order Mennonites. Besides horse and buggy transportation, Plain dress and low technology, they share traditions stemming from their common Pennsylvania German heritage.

== See also ==
- Peace churches
- Plain people
