= Niscience =

Religious movement, founded in 1953

Niscience a religious movement, is an abbreviation for the Ann Ree Colton Foundation of Niscience, Inc. United States, which was founded in 1953 by Ann Ree Colton. It is characterized as a combination of Christianity and New Age spirituality, and combines the teachings of Jesus Christ with an engagement with meditation, reincarnation, dream interpretation, creativity, and study.

== Overview ==
The Ann Ree Colton Foundation of Niscience, Inc., headquartered in Glendale, California, was co-founded in 1953 by Ann Ree Colton and her husband Jonathan Murro. The Niscience website states that it is a “non-profit religious and educational foundation.” The word “niscience” means knowing.

The Niscience website states that Niscience is based upon the teachings of "Jesus, the Bible, and other sacred scriptures of the East and the West. The writer Jean Moore described it as “a renaissance faith that blends nearly all facets of humanity, religion, science, the creative arts and philosophy.”

The first Niscience book, written by Ann Ree Colton, Islands of Light, was published in 1953. In 1957 property was purchased on Colorado St. in Glendale, California, where the Foundation is still located.

The Foundation's credo is: “To inspire others, to create, and to serve God.” Its motto is “Christ for this Age.” The front wall of the foundation property reads: Religion, Philosophy, Science, and the Creative Arts.

Niscience is a ministry training school “sustained by the theme of participation; each member is given the opportunity to qualify to become a Lay Minister. At present the majority of members are active participants in the Lay Ministry.”

Services are held in “The Chapel of the Jesus Ethic”, which was built in 1965.

After Colton's death in 1984 Murro ran the foundation until he committed suicide in November 1991. After his death the Los Angeles Times, describing Niscience as "an obscure Glendale-based religious group", wrote that "several former members--including one who had sat on the board of directors--recently sent open letters to church adherents, calling Niscience an oppressive, deceptive cult, and urging members to leave. Membership reportedly numbers several hundred."

Since that time, Niscience has operated under the guidance of an Administrator, appointed by the Board of Directors, a Board of Directors who are elected from its membership, and its ministers.

== Publications ==
During their lifetimes, the founders published 26 books: 17 by Colton, 6 co-authored by Colton and Murro, and 3 by Murro. They established White Paper lessons, monthly materials providing daily instruction. A monthly magazine, Agape, contains articles by its members along with selected writings from Colton and Murro.

== Creativity ==
As noted in its website, creativity is encouraged. Colton and Murro produced many paintings, mosaics, sculptures, and songs. All members are “urged to contribute his artistic and spiritual gifts to the creation of murals, mosaic-tile windows and other works of art.” The creativity extends to pleasance (pronounced pla-zance), creative dance to the writings of Colton and scripture, an annual New Song Night, when songs by members are presented by the choir, and an annual Art Show, where members creative projects are exhibited. Many of the songs are available on CD.

== Instructional videos ==
Hundreds of Colton's and Murro's talks and darshans are preserved on CD and DVD formats. Some may be purchased, while a few are available to watch on its YouTube channel.
