= International Messianic Jewish Alliance =

The International Messianic Jewish Alliance is an umbrella organization for various national Messianic Jewish organizations. Founded in 1925, as of 2023 it has 16 member organizations.
