= Seleucians =

The Seleucians were an ancient Gnostic sect who are said to have flourished in Galatia.

== History ==
They derived their name from a Seleucus, who with a certain Hermias is said to have propounded and taught their beliefs. According to Philastrius (Diversarum Hereseon Liber, LV), the teaching of these beliefs was based on the crudest form of dualism. While they maintained that God was incorporeal, they asserted that matter was coeternal with Him. They exceeded the usual dualistic tenets in attributing evil to God as well as to matter. In their system the souls of men were not created by God, but were formed from earthly components -fire and air- by angels.

Christ, they said, did not sit at the right hand of the Father in Heaven because (Psalm xviii, 6) "He hath set his tabernacle in the sun" must be interpreted to mean that Christ left His body in the sun. They did not practise baptism, basing their refusal to do so on the words of John the Baptist (Matthew 3:11): "He shall baptize you in the Holy Ghost and fire". By hell they understood this present world, while Resurrection they explained as being merely the procreation over death with the expectation of a glorious immortality.

The doctrines of Seleucus and his adherents were the source of another series of doctrines taught by some of their disciples who called themselves Prolinianites or Hermeonites. These latter rejected the dogmas of the Resurrection and Last Judgment. According to Philastrius they 'perverted' (i.e. converted) large numbers.

A great deal of uncertainty exists regarding the history and real cause of the fact that the doctrines of the Seleucians so closely resembled those of Hermogenes, and because Hermogenes is not mentioned by Philastrius, conclude that these two were one and the same system of belief. This assumption is plausible but there are vital differences between the teaching of Hermogenes and that of the Seleucians as, for example, on the subject of Christ as Creator which, together with the virgin birth, was admitted by Hermogenes. If any weight is to be attached to a method of chronology which seems rather arbitrary, the date assigned by Philastrius to the Seleucians, viz. after the reign of Decius, would exclude the supposition that he confounded them with the followers of Hermogenes.
