= Christ Gospel Churches International =

Fundamentalist, Pentecostal Christian denomination

Christ Gospel Church ("CGC") is a fundamentalist, Pentecostal non-denominational church organization founded in the 1950s by Berniece Hicks in Louisville, Kentucky, after Hicks split from William Branham's congregation.

After Hicks' death, the church has undergone several splits resulting in breakaway congregations, including Return Ministries in Clarksville, Indiana, and most recently The Remnant Sanctuary, pastored by Drs. Joshua and Mitzi Phelan, in a building on a separate property formerly the site of a controversial funeral home.

== Doctrines ==
Christ Gospel Church's Pentecostal emphasis is seen in teaching the baptism of the Holy Spirit with the evidence of glossolalia, or speaking in tongues (Acts 2:4,11,38).¹ However, church teachings do not believe that evidence of glossolalia is a requirement for salvation; rather, it is a gift that Christians can accept as they desire. The church also teaches that water baptism by immersion is a commandment for all Christians (Acts 2:38; 8:12; 9:5,18).¹

The church believes that worship should embrace all kinds of music (e.g., traditional hymns, choruses, country gospel, urban gospel, classical) and musical instruments (e.g., drums, guitars, pianos, saxophones, trumpets, violins). An example of the church's uniquely intense style of worship can be found in the Harp Warriors' prayer meeting particularly popular with its younger members.

Concerning theology, the church teaches "old-fashioned Holiness" in matters of conduct and dress, such as refraining from watching television or attending movie theatres, and women wearing dresses or skirts rather than pants. The emphasis of Hicks' teachings was, among other things, that the Bible, particularly and exclusively the King James Version, is the infallible Word of God and that it calls on Christians to grow to spiritual maturity, both in their moral development and in their spiritual love relationship with Jesus Christ, in order to be in the Bride of Christ. The core of her distinctive approach to Scripture was founded on her unsupported belief that the Tabernacle used by the Israelites from the Exodus to the Conquest of Canaan was laid out in the form of a cross and serves as a picture or metaphor of Christian believers' spiritual experiences as they grow to maturity in Christ Jesus, as taught in the New Testament (Hebrews 9:8-11; Ephesians 2:19-22).

Hicks taught the doctrine of the Rapture of a select group of Christians called overcomers. Hicks also said on numerous occasions that Jesus Christ communicated with her both audibly and in person. These concepts can be found throughout Hicks's numerous publications and in church teachings, which are offered on the church website. Neither Hicks' books nor the church generally cites or refers to any other denomination or spiritual leader.

== International outreach ==
Mission outreach is an important part of Christ Gospel Churches' ministry.

Over 1500 churches world-wide are believed to be affiliated with Christ Gospel Churches International Inc (CGCII). Each country's Christ Gospel affiliated organization is an independent legal entity run by local church leaders. All follow the ecclesiastical model of faith expressed by Christ Gospel Churches International Inc.

Support for Mexico ministries is a major focus of Christ Gospel Churches International, Inc.

Christ Gospel Church is among the fastest growing evangelical groups in Mexico. Today, there are over 500 churches, an orphans' home, and two Bible schools.

CGCII provides seed funds to many local affiliated churches world-wide for the development of Christian congregations, church buildings, and many charitable works. Depending on local needs, CGCII also supports schools, orphanages, and feeding programs in Haiti, India, and Africa.

== Distribution ==
Christ Gospel Churches International claims some 70 congregations in the United States, over 400 in India, about 500 in Mexico, and affiliates in several countries of Africa and Central America. There are congregations in El Salvador, England, the Faroe Islands, Germany, Guatemala, Haiti, Iceland, Ireland, Jamaica, Japan, Mongolia, New Zealand, the Netherlands, the Philippines, Romania, Russia, Spain, South Africa, Sweden, and various countries of South America, including Colombia and Ecuador. In all, the movement claims over 1,400 affiliated congregations in 135 countries (2008). Its international offices are located in Jeffersonville, Indiana, where it operates a Bible Institute correspondence course based on Hicks' own works, publishing ministry, broadcast ministry, and audio ministry.
