= United Seventh-Day Brethren =

The United Seventh-Day Brethren is a small sabbatarian Adventist body.

In 1947, several individuals and two independent congregations within the Church of God Adventist movement came together to form the United Seventh-Day Brethren. The organization was effected in order to increase fellowship and to combine their efforts in evangelism, publications, and other ministries.

The United Seventh-Day Brethren shares traits with other Church of God Adventist bodies, but is quite distinct from most other Christian groups known as Brethren. Their teachings include a belief in one God, and in the virgin birth, death, resurrection and ascension of Jesus Christ. The Ten Commandments, including the seventh-day sabbath, are recognized as still in effect. The eating of clean meats and abstinence from unclean meats is observed according to the standards of the Old Testament Law of Moses. The widespread Christian belief in the immortality of the soul is rejected. Seventh-Day Brethren are premillennial in eschatology. Each local congregation is autonomous.

The Vision was once an official periodical of the United Seventh-Day Brethren. Now privately owned, it still reflects the beliefs of the church. In 1980, the General Association of United Seventh-Day Brethren consisted of four congregations, one each in Iowa, Missouri, Nebraska and Oklahoma.

The Iowa congregation was located in Marion, Iowa with pastor W. Allen Bond. It was formed in the early 1960s and disbanded in the early 1980s
