= Associated Brotherhood of Christians =

- Origin: 1933

The Associated Brotherhood of Christians is a Christian religious denomination. The meetings to found the group first took place in 1933, under the direction of E. E. Partridge and H. A. Riley. The group was incorporated during World War II.
