= Colluthians =

4th-century Christian sect

The Colluthians were a Christian sect of the fourth century. Their tenets held that God did not create the wicked, and that thus God was not the being responsible for the existence of evil in the world. They disappeared around 340, shortly after the death of the founding priest, Colluthus.

== Colluthus ==
Colluthus was a presbyter of Alexandria who separated from the communion of Alexander in the early days of controversy, based on the pretext that the archbishop was too indecisive in his action against heresy. He held separate assemblies and ordained his own priests. He was deposed by the Council of Alexandria in 324, and regarded as a schismatic rather than a heretic. He died before 340.
