= Dyrniki =

The dyrniki, or "hole-worshippers", (Russian: Дырники) were a group of Old Believers who emerged in the 18th century as a radical branch of the netovshchina, or self-baptizers. They rejected the church reforms of Patriarch Nikon in the 17th century and considered themselves the only true Orthodox Christians. They had some distinctive beliefs and practices that set them apart from other Old Believers and the official Russian Orthodox Church.

The dyrniki did not recognize any religious authorities over them, not even the elders or the starovery (old ritualists). They believed that each individual had a direct connection with God and could interpret the Scriptures by themselves. They also did not accept any written books or documents as sources of religious knowledge, except for the Bible and the Psalter.

The dyrniki refused to venerate any icons, as they considered them defiled by the "heretics" who followed Nikon's reforms. They also rejected the icons that were painted before the reforms, as they believed that they were contaminated by contact with the "heretics". They thought that the only true image of God was the sun, which they called "the living icon". Therefore, they prayed strictly towards the east, where the sun rises.

The dyrniki did not have any special places for worship, as they believed that they could not be consecrated by anyone. They prayed outdoors in the summer, and in the winter they made holes or windows in the walls of their houses, through which they could see the sun or the sky. They considered it a sin to pray through a wall or a glass window, as they would block their direct communication with God. They covered the holes with plugs when they were not praying.

The dyrniki practiced a strict asceticism and avoided any contact with the outside world. They lived in isolated communities in remote areas, mostly in Siberia. They wore simple clothes made of coarse linen or hemp, and ate only bread, water, and salt. They did not use any utensils or tools made of metal, as they believed that metal was cursed by God after Cain killed Abel with an iron weapon. They also did not cut their hair or nails, as they regarded them as parts of their bodies that should not be separated from them.

The dyrniki had a peculiar view of marriage and family. They believed that marriage was a worldly institution that distracted people from God. Therefore, they did not marry in the church or have any wedding ceremonies. They simply lived together as couples, without any legal or religious recognition. They also did not baptize their children, as they believed that baptism was unnecessary for salvation. They taught their children to read and write only in order to study the Bible and the Psalter.

The dyrniki were persecuted by both the state and the church authorities, who considered them dangerous heretics and rebels. Many of them were arrested, tortured, exiled, or executed. Some of them committed suicide by burning themselves alive or drowning themselves in rivers, as they believed that this was a way of martyrdom and purification. The dyrniki gradually declined in number and influence, and by the 20th century they were almost extinct. Only a few small groups of them survived in some parts of Siberia and Central Asia.

In the late 20th century and in the population survey of 2010, there were some dyrniki in the Komi Republic.
