= Chazinzarians =

Armenian sect

The Chazinzarians, also called Chazitzarii or Staurolatræ, were an Armenian sect mentioned by Nicephorus Callistus Xanthopoulos. Their name is derived from chaza, the Armenian word for the cross. The members of the sect are described as worshippers of the cross, and hence are also called Staurolatrae (Niceph. Historia Ecclesiastica xviii. 54).

Demetrius of Cyzicus, writing in the eleventh century, speaks of the sect as still existing, and say that its adherents were Nestorians in principle, maintaining a dual personality in Christ instead of two natures in one person. He also records that they used fermented bread, and wine unmixed with water, in celebrating the Holy Eucharist. (Demetr. Cyzicens. de Jacobit. Haer. ac Chatzitzariorum, in Bibl. Max. Lugd. xii. 814.)

They held an annual feast in honor of the dog of their prophet Sergius.
