= National Evangelical Presbyterian Church of Guatemala =

The National Evangelical Presbyterian Church of Guatemala (Spanish: Iglesia Evangélica Nacional Presbiteriana de Guatemala) was founded in 1882 by missionaries of the Presbyterian Church United States in Guatemala. The church took root in the urban middle-class people In 1950 the first Synod was organised and become independent in 1962. The church grew in membership rapidly among the indigenous people. The church has one Synod and 6 Spanish-speaking and 11 indigenous language presbyteries. Total membership is 60,000. Over the years the church was active in evangelism in the country of Honduras. The Evangelical Presbyterian Seminary was established in San Felipe. Today the majority of Synod composed by indigenous believers. The impact of Pentecostal movement has grown significantly in the recent years. The church affirms the Apostles Creed and Westminster Confession of Faith.

Member of the World Communion of Reformed Churches.
