= Primitive Advent Christian Church =

The Primitive Advent Christian Church is a small body of Adventist Christians which separated from the Advent Christian Church. They have a common early history. Adventists who had adopted the "conditional immortality" views of Charles F. Hudson and George Storrs formed the Advent Christian Association in Salem, Massachusetts in 1860.

Like Primitive Baptists, and Primitive Methodists the Primitive Advent Christian Church uses the modifier Primitive to signify the idea that they represent the original teachings of the church. This denomination was formed as a response to the controversial preaching of Reverend Whitman, a minister of the Advent Christian Church in West Virginia. They differ from the parent body mainly in two points. They observe feet washing as a rite of the church, and they teach that reclaimed backsliders should be baptized (even though they had formerly been baptized). This is sometimes referred to as rebaptism.

Officers in the Primitive Advent Christian Church are pastors, elders and deacons. A conference for church business is conducted annually.

The church had 427 members in 9 congregations in 1990, all of which were located in central West Virginia.
