= Edinburgh Churches Together =

Edinburgh Churches Together brings together Church of Scotland, Scottish Episcopal Church, the Catholic Church, the Methodist Church, the Salvation Army, Religious Society of Friends and the United Reformed Church.

Edinburgh Churches Together (ECT) was formed in the early 1990s as a local response to the establishment of Action of Churches Together in Scotland (ACTS). The purpose was to allow the different denominations to be able to work together in areas of common concern while retaining their own identity. Within Edinburgh there are a number of local Churches Together Groups. As well as encouraging and enabling churches to relate and communicate with one another, ECT also has a brief to relate to the Edinburgh City Council and other citywide bodies including the Edinburgh Interfaith Association.
