= United American Free Will Baptist Church =

American Black Churches

The United American Free Will Baptist Church is the oldest national body of predominantly black Free Will Baptists in the United States.

== History ==
The Free Will Baptist Church in America grew up on two separate fronts: North and South. In the South the denomination began in 1727 when Paul Palmer started a church in Chowan, North Carolina. The work in the north began with a congregation organized by Benjamin Randall in 1780 at New Durham, New Hampshire. Though they arose independently and there was no organizational connection between them, both taught the doctrines of free grace, free salvation and free will.

Free blacks and black slaves were members of predominantly white Free Will Baptist congregations of the South. African-Americans organized their first separate congregation, Shady Grove Free Will Baptist Church, at Snow Hill, Greene County, North Carolina, in 1867. The first annual conference was organized in 1870, and the first association in 1887. The first General Conference for United Free Will Baptists convened at St. John's church in Kinston, North Carolina, on May 8, 1901. The greatest strength of this body is in North Carolina, where it maintains headquarters and a tabernacle and operates Kinston College in North Carolina. In 2007, there was an estimated 75,000 members in about 500 churches. The General Conference has published a book of discipline since 1903 and publishes a periodical called The Free Will Baptist Advocate. The United American Free Will Baptist Church is a member of the National Fraternal Council of Negro Churches. Bishop J. E. Reddick currently serves as General Bishop.

In 1968, a division brought about a second group of black Free Will Baptists, the United American Free Will Baptist Conference.

== Sources ==
- Encyclopedia of African-American Religions, Larry G. Murphy, et al., editors
- Encyclopedia of American Religions, J. Gordon Melton, editor
- Baptists Around the World, by Albert W. Wardin Jr., 1995
- Dictionary of Baptists in America, Bill J. Leonard, editor, 1994
- "The History and Theology of the National Fraternal Council of Negro Churches" (Master's Thesis, Union Theological Seminary, New York, NY), by Spurgeon E. Crayton
- The Twelve Tribe of Baptists in the USA, by Albert W. Wardin Jr., 2007
