= United American Free Will Baptist Conference =

Christian denomination in United States

- Classification: Western Christian
- Orientation: Protestant
- Theology: Baptist
- Polity: Congregationalist and episcopal
- General Bishop: K. R. Brown
- Headquarters: Lakeland, Florida
- Territory: North America
- Origin: 1968; Lakeland, Florida
- Separated from: United American Free Will Baptist Church
- Congregations: 26
- Official website: uafwbc.com

The United American Free Will Baptist Conference (UAFWBC) is a predominantly African-American, Free Will Baptist denomination founded in the United States.

== History ==
Prior to emancipation, black slaves and free blacks were members of predominantly white, Free Will Baptist congregations in the United States. The first black Free Will Baptist minister was Robert Tash, ordained in 1827. African-Americans organized their first separate congregation in 1867 at Snow Hill in Greene County, North Carolina, the first annual conference in 1870, and the first association in 1887. The General Conference of United Free Will Baptists was formed in 1901. The United American Free Will Baptist Conference, was created in 1968 under the leadership of O. L. Williams of Lakeland, Florida, resulting from a division in the parent United American Free Will Baptist Church.

In 2007 the United American Free Will Baptist Conference had seventy-five congregations with approximately 11,200 members, mostly in Florida, but also in South Carolina, Louisiana, and Arkansas. In addition to the annual meeting of the general conference, there are six regional conferences that meet annually: South Carolina Annual Conference, Louisiana/Arkansas Annual Conference, East Florida Annual Conference, West Florida Annual Conference, the South Florida "A" Annual Conference, and South Florida "B" Annual Conference.

== Organization ==
The United American Free Will Baptist Conference is led by its general bishop, an executive board, and college of bishops.

== Doctrine ==
The United American Free Will Baptists have an affirmation of faith, based upon the Nicene and Apostles' creeds; the denomination also adopts a church covenant. Additionally, the UAFWBC contains an extensive doctrinal statement. While congregationalist, the denomination's offices are structured as bishops or elders, and deacons; and the denomination has female pastors.
