= Igreja Unida =

Church in Brazil

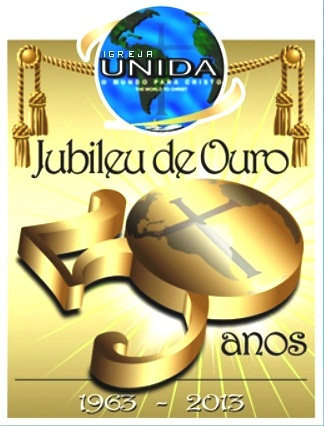
50 years anniversary of the Igreja Unida

The Igreja Unida is a Pentecostal evangelical church in São Paulo, Brazil. It was founded on July 12, 1963, by Pastor Luiz Schiliro. Its faith mission is based on the Bible. Its members practice immersive baptism in the name of the Divine Trinity.

== History ==
Igreja Unida was born by the merging of Igreja Crista Pentecostal Evangelização e Cura Divina “Maravilhas de Jesus”; Igreja Evangélica do Povo end Igreja Crista Evangélica Unida. Initially, it was named Igreja Evangélica Pentecostal Unida, changed later due to legal requirements.

== Organization ==
Igreja Unida is governed by its Convention, Convenção Unida Brasileira, headquartered in São Paulo. It operates under statutory laws, with a Board of Directors, counsels, and departments. Pastor Leonardo Meyer is the president.
