= Spirit Church (China) =

New religious movement from China

Spirit Church (Chinese: 灵灵教; pinyin: Línglíngjiào), also known as Efficacious Spirit Teachings, is a new religious movement from China. It was founded in the 1980s, in Hunan by Hua Xuehe (华雪和), a primary school teacher with high school education from Jiangsu. Hua was a member of the Chinese Communist Party who became a Protestant in 1978 and joined the True Jesus Church in 1979. In 1982, he left the True Jesus Church and established his own movement.

Its areas of presence include Jiangsu, Jiangxi, Anhui, Hunan, Hubei, Henan and Shandong. It has Pentecostal features and may be regarded as a break-away group from the Chinese Pentecostal group, the True Jesus Church.

Hua claims to be the second incarnation of Christ and teaches that we live in a new era when Christians should pray in his name rather than in the name of Christ. His followers celebrate Hua's birth date, January 19, instead of Christmas. They regard as evidence of Hua's divine nature the fact that his name (华雪和; Huá Xuěhé) differs by just one syllable from the Chinese word for Jehovah (耶和华; Yēhéhuá).

Spirit Church is illegal in China and labelled heretical. Hua was arrested in 1990, and sent to a labor camp. He has reportedly since been released. In 2015, scholar Emily Dunn reported that "his whereabouts and fate are unknown," while the movement reportedly had some 15,000 followers.

== See also ==
- Heterodox teachings (Chinese law)
