= Ancient Christian Commentary on Scripture =

The Ancient Christian Commentary on Scripture (ACCS) is a twenty-nine volume set of commentaries on the Bible published by InterVarsity Press. It is a confessionally collaborative project as individual editors have included scholars from Eastern Orthodoxy, Roman Catholicism, and Protestantism as well as Jewish participation. Notable scholars who contributed to the series’ publication include Andrew Louth, Peter W. Ochs, Benedicta Ward, Frances Young, Christopher A. Hall, Gerald L. Bray, and Manlio Simonetti. The ACCS was first conceived of in 1993 and inspired by Joseph Cardinal Ratzinger. The Methodist scholar Thomas C. Oden, one of the leading paleo-orthodox theologians of the twentieth and twenty-first centuries, serves as the overall ACCS series editor and the ACCS uses the ecumenically-minded Revised Standard Version of the Bible for its biblical translation.

== Format ==
The ACCS covers both the Old Testament and the New Testament, including portions of the deuterocanonical writings which have varying degrees of acceptance among Christian traditions. Its format is such that some volumes contain only a portion of one biblical book (for instance, the ACCS commentary on Genesis is divided between Genesis 1-11 and Genesis 12-50) while other volumes of the ACCS contain multiple biblical books (for instance, Old Testament IV covers Joshua, Judges, Ruth, and 1-2 Samuel). The ACCS was modelled after the Talmud, with Oden explaining that “We are trying to do for the Christian community what the Talmud was seeking to do for the Jewish liturgical memory.”

The ACCS's editorial team employed the latest in digital technology, including Boolean searches, to track down Greek and Latin sources for texts, including many which had not yet been translated into English. The ACCS editors also made use of The Fathers of the Church (85 volumes) and the Nicene and Post-Nicene Fathers (38 volumes), drawing from the Church Fathers’ various writings, sermons, poetry, and letters. Oden explains that from the array of texts available, editors were “encouraged…to select the best, wisest, and most representative reflections of the ancient Christian writers on any given biblical passage” in order to keep each volume concise. In this way, the ACCS attempts to provide consensual commentary rather than propagating one particular biblical interpretation.

== Mission and scope ==
The ACCS's mission is to provide the accumulated wisdom of patristic exegesis on the biblical text by assembling and presenting the comments of both well-known Church Fathers such as Augustine, John Chrysostom, Jerome, and Gregory the Great as well as lesser-known figures including Pseudo-Macarius and Fulgentius of Ruspe and writings of the Church Fathers whose work does not yet appear in modern English. As one article explained, “Dr. Oden and his colleagues have chosen a form of presentation with, as he puts it, ‘venerable antecedents’ in Eastern Orthodoxy, medieval scholasticism, and the Reformation tradition of Glossa ordinaria—line-by-line commentaries on Bible texts.” The ACCS employs a presentation style with roots in the Christian tradition. Commentary was drawn from writings originally composed between the New Testament era to AD 750. The ACCS also provides early non-European biblical interpretations as many of the early Church Fathers were based in the eastern Mediterranean world and in northern Africa. While the early Reformers were well-versed in patristics, many modern evangelicals are unfamiliar with the Church Fathers and the ACCS was designed as a means of “ressourcement," particularly for evangelicals interested in patristic thought.

The ACCS was largely funded through subscription, with approximately half of the original twenty-thousand subscribers committing through to the project’s completion. The first three volumes to be released covered the books of Matthew, Mark, and Romans. The ACCS has also been translated into other languages, including Chinese and Russian and is available in both print and electronic formats. The ACCS is consistently listed as a highly recommended commentary series by biblical scholars.

== List of volumes ==
Volume	Title	Editor(s) (with Thomas C. Oden)	Year Published
OT 1	Genesis 1-11	Andrew Louth	2001
OT 2	Genesis 12-50	Mark Sheridan	2002
OT 3	Exodus, Leviticus, Numbers, Deuteronomy	Joseph T. Lienhard	2001
OT 4	Joshua, Judges, Ruth, 1-2 Samuel	John R. Franke	2005
OT 5	1-2 Kings, 1-2 Chronicles, Ezra, Nehemiah, Esther	Marco Conti	2008
OT 6	Job	Manlio Simonetti and Marco Conti	2006
OT 7	Psalms 1-50	Craig A. Blaising and Carmen S. Hardin	2008
OT 8	Psalms 51-150	Quentin F. Wesselschmidt	2007
OT 9	Proverbs, Ecclesiastes, Song of Solomon	J. Robert Wright	2005
OT 10	Isaiah 1-39	Steven A. McKinion	2004
OT 11	Isaiah 40-66	Mark W. Elliott	2007
OT 12	Jeremiah, Lamentations	Dean O. Wenthe	2009
OT 13	Ezekiel, Daniel	Kenneth Stevenson and Michael Glerup	2008
OT 14	The Twelve Prophets	Alberto Ferreiro	2003
OT 15	Apocrypha	Sever Voicu	2010
NT 1a	Matthew 1-13	Manlio Simonetti	2001
NT 1b	Matthew 14-28	Manlio Simonetti	2002
NT 2	Mark	Christopher A. Hall	1998
NT 3	Luke	Arthur Just Jr.	2003
NT 4a	John 1-10	Joel C. Elowsky	2006
NT 4b	John 11-21	Joel C. Elowsky	2007
NT 5	Acts	Francis Martin	2006
NT 6	Romans	Gerald L. Bray	1998
NT 7	1-2 Corinthians	Gerald L. Bray	1999
NT 8	Galatians, Ephesians, Philippians	Mark J. Edwards	1999
NT 9	Colossians, 1-2 Thessalonians, 1-2 Timothy, Titus, Philemon	Peter J. Gorday	2000
NT 10	Hebrews	Erik M. Heen and Philip D. W. Krey	2005
NT 11	James, 1-2 Peter, 1-3 John, Jude	Gerald L. Bray	2000
NT 12	Revelation	William C. Weinrich	2005

== Related projects ==
The ACCS was released alongside The Church's Bible (CB) commentary series edited by Robert Louis Wilken and published by Eerdmans, a similar commentary series that featured longer extracts from the Church Fathers and which included writings that went up to AD 1000. The ACCS helped to inspire the similar Reformation Commentary on Scripture, also published by Intervarsity Press and which is still currently ongoing and which collects portions of biblical interpretations from Protestant Reformers such as Martin Luther, Martin Bucer, and John Calvin. Timothy George of Beeson Divinity School serves as its general editor. The ACCS also helped to inspire the five-volume Ancient Christian Doctrine series and the 15-volume Ancient Christian Texts series which provides readers with homilies and more extensive commentary from the Church Fathers.
