= CCOA =

CCOA may refer to:

- California Correctional Officers Association, former name of the California Correctional Peace Officers Association
- Catholic Apostolic Church of Antioch, an independent Catholic church not in communion with Rome
- Chinese Cereals and Oils Association, a national scientific and technical association
- Clear Channel Outdoor Americas, an outdoor advertising company
- IIHF Challenge Cup of Asia, an international ice hockey competition
