= Charismatic Episcopal Church bishops =

The International Communion of the Charismatic Episcopal Church (also known as the ICCEC) is an international Christian communion established as an Autocephalous Patriarchate in 1992 with over 1,000 churches worldwide. The Communion has its apostolic succession within the historical episcopate through the Rebiban line via Roman Catholic Bishop Carlos Duarte Costa, who founded the Brazilian Catholic Apostolic Church.

On 26 June 1992, Austin Randolph Adler was consecrated the first bishop and primate of the CEC with Timothy Michael Barker of the International Free Catholic Communion (who was consecrated by Archbishop-Patriarch Herman Adrian Spruit) functioning as the principal consecrator. In 1997, the Charismatic Episcopal Church sought and acquired reconsecration and reordination of all of its clergy by the Brazilian Catholic Apostolic Church, thus strengthening their lines of apostolic succession.

- A = Brazilian Catholic Apostolic Church
  A1 = Luis Fernando Castillo Mendez
  A2 = Josivaldo Pereira de Olivera
  A3 = Olinto Ferreira Pinto Filho
- B = Episcopal Missionary Church
  B1 = William Millsaps
- C = International Free Catholic Communion
  C1 = Timothy Michael Barker
- D =
  D1 = Delmer Tripp Robinson

== List of bishops in the ICCEC ==
No.	Date	Consecrator	Name	Jurisdiction(s)	Notes
1	26 June 1992	C1	Austin Randolph Adler, D.D.	Patriarch ICCEC; Primate USA; Abp. San Clemente	Retired October 2007; Deceased December 2016
2	23 April 1993		Joseph Moats	Abp. Southwest Province; Bp. Arizona, USA	Resigned 2002
3	5 November 1993	1 2 D1	Randolph W. Sly, M.Div., D.D.	Abp. Eastern Province, USA; Bp. of the Potomac; Bp. Maryland	Resigned November 2006
4	14 November 1993	1 3 B1	Dale F. Howard, M.Div., D.D.	Abp. Southeast Province, USA; Bp. Florida, USA	Deposed October 2005
	14 November 1993	B1	Episcopal Missionary Church		Added line to 1 and 2
5	26 August 1994		Malcolm Smith	Aux. Bp. Texas, USA	Resigned 1999
6	16 September 1994	1	Loren Thomas Hines, D.D.	Primate Asia; Abp. Philippines; Bp. Manila	Retired September 2013; Resigned November 2014
7	4 November 1994	1	Douglas S. Woodall, Th.D.	Abp. Armed Forces, USA	Resigned 26 January 2011
8	9 June 1995	2 3 5 7	Kenneth Myers	Bp. South Central Province, USA	Resigned October 2006
9	4 August 1995		Richard W. Lipka	Bp. Delmarva, USA (Delaware, Eastern Shore of Maryland)	Resigned October 2006
10	8 September 1995	3 4 7 9	Philip Zampino	Bp. Mid Atlantic, USA	Resigned May 2006
11	17 March 1996		Douglas Kessler	Bp. Northwest Province, USA	
12	10 May 1996		Frederick G. Fick, B.A.	Bp. Great Lakes Province, USA	Resigned October 2006
13	22 September 1996		Jose Elmer Medrano Belmonte	Bp. Confederation of Filipino Churches in Europe	
14	18 April 1997		John Holloway, M.Div, D.D.	Bp. Georgia, USA	Retired 31 May 2009; Emeritus 1 Feb 2012; Deceased February 2014
15	25 April 1997		Charles "Chuck" W. Jones	Abp. Southeast Province, USA; Bp. Alabama	
16	16 August 1997		Benson Odinga O'Otieno	Bp. Nairobi, Kenya	Emeritus (Deceased July 2008)
17	17 August 1997		Bernard Njoroge Kariuki	Assistant Patriarchal Legate to Africa and General Secretary of Kenya and Tanzania; Bp. Nairobi, Kenya	Retired Mar 2014
18	22 August 1997		Raymundo D. Abogatal, Jr.	Bp. Northern Mindanao, Philippines	
19	22 August 1997		Ricardo Alcaraz	Bp. Visayas, Philippines	
20	22 August 1997		Lowell Eugene Lilly, Jr.	Bp. Southern Mindanao, Philippines	Deceased December 2021
	5 November 1997	A1 A2 A3	Brazilian Catholic line received.		
21	14 November 1997		Craig Bates, M.Div.	Patriarch ICCEC, Primate USA, Bp. Northeast Province, Bp. New York	
22	14 February 1998		Joseph Mahon, M.A.	Bp. Colorado, USA	Emeritus
23	7 August 1998		Paulino Villavicencio	Bp. Southern Luzon, Philippines	
24	20 September 1998	4 16	Daniel Kimwele	Bp. Kitui, Kenya	
25	20 September 1998	1 17 6 13	Enoch Sasaka	Bp. River Nzoia, Kenya	Retired
26	22 September 1998		John Obokech	Abp. Uganda	Deposed September 2006
27	5 February 1999		Frank J. Costantino	Bp. for St. Dismas Prison Ministry	Deceased 2 April 2006
28	6 August 1999	1 3 8 10 11 15 21 27	Michael B. Davidson, PhD	Bp. Central Province, USA	
29	10 September 1999		Rick Painter D.Min.	Bp. Phoenix, USA	Resigned July 2006
30	4 November 1999		Prakash Yuhanna	Bp. Pakistan	
31	8 December 2000	12	Donald Miles	Aux. Bp. Great Lakes Province, USA	Resigned May 2006
32	18 February 2001		Moses Meeli Ngusa	Bp. Kajaido, Kenya	
33	25 February 2001		Hannington Bahemuka	Bp. Mountains of the Moon, Uganda	
34	16 March 2001		Bernard Afwanda Obora	Bp. River Nzoia South, Kenya	Deceased 30 August 2012
35	26 May 2001		Bernard Matolo	Bp. Machacos, Kenya	
36	26 May 2001		Francis Gogo	Bp. Mount Elgon, Uganda	
37	1 June 2001		Samuel Kamanya Lubogo	Bp. Source of Nile, Uganda	
38	21 September 2001	1 6 13	Felicisimo Cordero	Aux. Bp. for Spain	Resigned
39	25 May 2002		Peter Zedekiah Otsulah Chunge	Bp. River Nzoia Central, Kenya	
40	24 August 2002	1 4 26	Philip Weeks	Aux. Bp. for International Missions	Resigned January 2007; Restored 11 December 2008
41	15 February 2003		Joshua Ayoo Koyo	Bp. Great Lakes East, Kenya and General Secretary of Kenya	
42	8 September 2003	1 4 6	Paulo Ruiz Garcia	Abp. and Primate Brazil	Resigned
43	21 February 2004	? 40	Emmanual Ngirumpatse	Bp. Rwanda	
44	15 January 2005		Prudence Ngarambe	Aux. Bp. Northeast Province, USA	Retired 1 August 2006
45	2 May 2005	? 40	Daudi H. Chidawli	Bp. Tanzania	Resigned 18 April 2007
46	4 May 2005	? 40	Charles Sekelwa	Bp. Lake Victoria, Tanzania	
47	9 July 2006		Jothan Kabonabe Tibafa	Bp. Graben, Democratic Republic of Congo	Deceased Jun 2014
48	9 July 2006		Tom Nak Kokanyi	Bp. Sudan	
49	9 July 2006		Yusto Ntugnwwa Muhereza	Bp. Uganda	
50	12 January 2007	15	David Simpson	Bp. Florida, USA	
51	18 March 2007	15 17 43	Nitonde Dieudonne	Bp. Northern Burundi	
52	18 March 2007	15 17 43	Nestor Misigaro	Bp. Southern Burundi	
53	18 March 2007	15 17 43	Katarama Kizungu Sylvain	Bp. Northeast Congo	
54	14 April 2007	1	Alexandre Barbosa Monteiro Ximenes	Aux. Bp. Brazil	
55	14 April 2007	1	Frederico Carreiro Rego Bastos	Bp. Vitória, Brazil	
56	16 November 2007	15 20 50	W. David Epps	Bp. Mid-South Diocese USA	
57	30 November 2007	42 54 55	Adonias Ramos de Sousa	Bp. Paulista, Brazil	
58	13 September 2008	21 17 28	Solomon Madara Kadiri	Bp. River Nzoia North, Kenya	
59	16 October 2009	21 16 28	Gregory Ortiz	Bp. Northeast Diocese USA	
60	16 November 2009	42 54 55 57	Andre Novas	Aux. Bp. Recife, Brazil	
61	17 August 2010	15 17 41	Tobias Calleb Onyango Opondo	Bp. Great Lakes West, Kenya	
62	20 August 2010	15 17 32	Elias Kimirei Ole Ntoipo	Bp. Mt. Kilimanjaro, Kenya	
63	22 August 2010	15 17	Jackson Ara Luhusa Madulesi	Bp. Dodoma, Tanzania	
64	25 August 2010	15 36	Japheth Iraka	Bp. Bunyoro-Magita, Uganda	
65	25 August 2010	15 36	Jimmy Bamuke Ruakoah	Bp. Upper Nile Missionary Diocese, Uganda	
66	25 August 2010	15 36	Eliasiba Woja Bute	Aux. Bp. Kindi, Sudan	
67	25 August 2010	15 36	Jacques Muhindo Niravahereni	Bp. Watalinga-Semuliki, Democratic Republic of Congo	
68	25 August 2010	15 36	Fréderic Lunkomo Bushiri	Bp. Kisangani, Democratic Republic of Congo	
69	18 September 2011	20 6 13 18 19 20 23 38	Ariel Cornelio P. Santos	Aux. Bp. Manila, Philippines	
70	21 April 2012	21 17 36 28	Ibiso Igani	Bp. Nigeria	
71	21 April 2012	21 17 36 28	Kome Baltazard	Bp. Granben Beno, Democratic Republic of Congo	
72	21 April 2012	21 17 36 28	Phenicas Biriki-Olumbe	Bp. Source of the Nile, Jinja, Uganda	Deceased May 2014
73	September 2015		Kamaali Eric	Bp. South West Uganda	
74	20 August 2016	41	Nicholus Imbiti Ingandima	Aux. Bp. Kenya	
75	15 March 2019	21 28 30	Robert Scott Northwood	Bp. Mid Atlantic	
76	29 May 2019	24	Abed Musyoka	Bp. Kitui, Kenya	

== See also ==
- Charismatic Episcopal Church timeline
- Episcopal polity
