= Sospeter Temeo Ndenza =

Anglican bishop

Sospeter Temeo Ndenza was the first Anglican bishop of Kibondo. During his administration, the Anglican Church of Tanzania's Kibondo jurisdiction partnered with the Anglican Mission in America. Under his leadership, the diocese also entered intercommunion between Missio Mosaic (a province of the Evangelical Episcopal Communion) under then-Bishop Page Brooks, and another Convergence denomination—the Apostolic Communion of Churches under Archbishop Thomas Henry Jr.

As of August 2026, Sospeter Temeo Ndenza was an Anglican bishop affiliated with the Anglican Mission Society Global.
