= Convergence Movement =

US Protestant Christian ecumenical movement

The Convergence Movement, also known as the Ancient-Future Faith, whose foundation is primarily attributed to Robert E. Webber in 1985, is an ecumenical Christian movement. Developed as an effort among evangelical, charismatic and Pentecostal, and liturgical Christians and denominations blending their forms of worship, the movement has been defined for its predominant use of Anglicanism's Book of Common Prayer; and use from additional liturgical sources common to Lutheranism, Eastern Orthodoxy, and Catholicism have also been employed.

Christian denominations, organizations and individuals within the movement have identified themselves as Ancient Faith or Ancient Church, Ancient-Future, Convergence, Charismatic Orthodox, evangelical Episcopal, paleo-orthodox, Pentecostal Catholic or Pentecostal Orthodox, and Liturgical Pentecostal. Denominations in the Convergence Movement have also been referred as some form of broader, or new Anglicanism or Episcopalianism.

The pioneers of the Convergence Movement were seeking to restore a primitive form of Christianity in contrast with the teachings of the Restoration Movement. The Ancient-Future Faith was inspired by the spiritual pilgrimages of Protestant writers like Thomas Howard, Robert E. Webber, Peter E. Gillquist, and ancient Christian writers including the Church Fathers and their communities. These men—along with theologians, scripture scholars, and pastors in a number of Protestant denominational traditions leading to the movement's foundation—were calling Christians back to what they saw as their roots in the early Church prior to the East–West Schism and rise of the state church of the Roman Empire.

== Background ==
In 1973, Campus Crusade for Christ missionary Peter E. Gillquist (1938–2012) of Chicago established a network of house churches throughout the United States of America—aiming to restore a primitive form of Christianity, which was called the New Covenant Apostolic Order. Studying Christian history, Gillquist and his colleagues found sources for this restoration in the writings of the early Church Fathers. This led the New Covenant Apostolic Order to practice a more liturgical form of worship than in their previous evangelical Protestant background.

In 1977, "The Chicago Call" was issued by the National Conference of Evangelicals for Historic Christianity, meeting in Warrenville, Illinois. Led by Robert E. Webber (Assoc. Professor of Theology at Wheaton College), along with Peter Gillquist, Thomas Howard, Richard Holt, Donald Bloesch, Jan Dennis, Lane Dennis, and Victor Oliver, the conference discussed the need for evangelical Protestants to rediscover and re-attach to the Christian Church's historic roots. The conference issued several documents which together are known as "The Chicago Call." Components of the document include: "A Call to Historic Roots and Continuity; A Call to Biblical Fidelity; A Call to Creedal Identity; A Call to Holistic Salvation; A Call to Sacramental Integrity; A Call to Spirituality; A Call to Church Authority; and A Call to Church Unity."

In 1979, the Evangelical Orthodox Church was organized. The belief of needing apostolic succession and the historic episcopacy led most members of Evangelical Orthodoxy to join the Antiochian Orthodox Christian Archdiocese of North America in 1987. Others later joined the Orthodox Church in America.

In 1984 Charisma magazine—one of the most influential magazines of the Charismatic Movement—published an article by Richard Lovelace entitled, "The Three Streams, One River?" (Sept 1984). Lovelace approvingly noted the trend of Catholics, Evangelicals, and Charismatic and Pentecostal Christians moving closer together.

Robert Webber's 1985 book—Evangelicals on the Canterbury Trail: Why Evangelicals are Attracted to the Liturgical Church—documented the stories of six evangelical Protestants who, for various reasons, had transitioned to the Protestant Episcopal Church in the United States. Publication of this book stirred up a great deal of interest in the evangelical Protestant press, generating numerous reviews in Christianity Today and other widely read evangelical publications.

== Development ==
In June 1992, the International Communion of the Charismatic Episcopal Church was established as a part of the Convergence Movement following the episcopal ordination of Randy Adler by Herman Adrian Spruit of the Catholic Apostolic Church of Antioch—an Independent Catholic jurisdiction embracing religious pluralism. By 1997, Adler and the clergy of the Charismatic Episcopal Church were conditionally ordained by bishops from the Brazilian Catholic Apostolic Church. By 2007, former Charismatic Episcopal Archbishop Randolph Sly joined the Catholic Church and was ordained into the Personal Ordinariate of the Chair of St. Peter, broadening recognition of the Convergence Movement among the ancient liturgical Christian denominations.

In 1995, the Communion of Evangelical Episcopal Churches was organized. In October 1995, approximately 300 individuals gathered from multiple denominational backgrounds; various bishops from Anglican, independent Eastern Orthodox and Old Catholic churches assisted in the episcopal ordination of the denomination's first two bishops, and the ordination of 25 pastors and seven deacons. Later, the Evangelical Episcopal Communion would schism with the Communion of Evangelical Episcopal Churches.

In 1999, Timothy Paul Baymon was initially elevated into the episcopacy by Peter Paul Brennan, Carl Jimenez, James Lagona and Joseph Grenier; and in December 2000, he would receive a conditional ordination by Herman R. Cannady Sr. Baymon had established the Holy Communion of Churches as a Convergence Movement denomination, where he was also elevated as their archbishop in 2000; and by 2015, he would then be enthroned as patriarch.

In 2005, the Christian Life Network of Churches and Ministries was established by Thomas Henry Jr., before eventually reorganizing itself in 2011 through the principles of the Convergence Movement as the Apostolic Communion of Churches. Under Archbishop Henry, the Apostolic Communion of Churches formalized intercommunion with a province of the Evangelical Episcopal Communion (Missio Mosaic), and the Anglican Diocese of Kibondo in Tanzania.

In 2011, Evangelical Episcopal Bishop Derek Jones was received by the Convocation of Anglicans in North America into the Anglican Church in North America. By March 2012—under the leadership of Quintin Moore—the Communion of Evangelical Episcopal Churches entered full communion with his denomination, Christian Communion International, as the denomination's United States province.

From 2008–2014, the Communion of Evangelical Episcopal Churches held informal ecumenical dialogue with the Roman Catholic Church through Bishop Tony Palmer. During an audience with Pope Francis, Palmer and Bishop Emilio Alvarez represented this denomination; Alvarez was the official translator for the meeting. Palmer continued to serve in papal audiences until his death, befriending Pope Francis.

Palmer's death was initially disclosed by Archbishop Charles Hill of Ambassadors for Christ Ministries of America, whom he also befriended and was a member of the same communion. Hill served as "Apostle Primate Patriarch Archbishop" within the Patriarchate in the World of Jesus Christ—an independent Eastern Orthodox group. Archbishop Hill would later lead a Charismatic Liberal Catholic denomination named the Ancient Church Global, claiming descent from the Knights Templar and self-proclaiming themselves the sole source of Independent, Old and Liberal Catholicism.

This denomination led by Hill upon their departure from the Communion of Evangelical Episcopal Churches also uniquely claimed to hold apostolic succession and continuity with Ancient Egyptian polytheistic religious practices; and their additional claims to succession and the historic episcopate stemmed from various wandering bishops within Independent and Old Catholicism, the American Orthodox Catholic Church, Anglicanism, and Gnosticism. By May 2023, a religious university founded by Hill for their Charismatic denomination conferred an honorary degree upon Liberian politician Matthew Zarzar.

In 2019, the Communion of Evangelical Episcopal Churches schismed, and the Continuing Evangelical Episcopal Communion (later reconstituted as the Confessing Anglican Church) was founded. Alvarez also left the Communion of Evangelical Episcopal Churches and organized the Union of Charismatic Orthodox Churches. By October 2020, he was elected to lead the denomination as its primate and in 2021 was installed as archbishop and primate for the denomination. In December 2020, the leadership of the Union of Charismatic Orthodox Churches met with Archbishop Elpidophoros of the Greek Orthodox Archdiocese of America (Ecumenical Patriarchate). Alvarez and the Convergence Movement were featured by Religion News Service, after a trend of young Christians returning to traditional churches.

In 2019, the Apostolic Communion of Anglican Churches—founded in 2005 through the principles of the Convergence Movement—received the former Anglican Church in North America priest Jack Lumanog. Joining this denomination, Lumanog was declared to have no ecclesiastical status through any province of the Global Fellowship of Confessing Anglicans following his election and ordination to the episcopacy by Archbishop Darel Chase. Chase also ordained a claimant to the Roman papacy, and organized the National Bible College Association accreditation mill which accredited their self-established Metropolitan Christian University and Midwestern School of Divinity for their churches.

Following Lumanog's episcopal ordination and the formation of the Anglican Diocese of St. Ignatius Loyola, in 2020, Gideon Arinzechukwu Uzomechina was appointed interim archdeacon for this diocese in the Apostolic Communion of Anglican Churches. Uzomechina was a deposed Episcopalian priest accused of fraud and sexual misconduct with young men. In December 2022, Uzomechina and his church were publicly disowned by the Church of Nigeria to prevent alleged misrepresentation.

In 2022, Archbishop Sterling Lands II of the Evangelical Episcopal Communion, and Archbishop Deng Dau Deng, former archbishop-elect of the Anglican Church of South Sudan, joined the African Episcopal Church organized and led by Chase. By 2023 Jonathan Kyangasha—an expelled Church of Uganda priest—joined the African Episcopal Church. Kyangasha founded the Reformed Anglican Church in Uganda after his expulsion in 2017. A year later, Lumanog joined the African Episcopal Church's house of bishops, and a lawsuit by Uzomechina against the Episcopal Diocese of New Jersey alleging discrimination and wrongful deposition was dismissed.

== Apostolic succession ==
Since the advent of Convergence Christianity, numerous denominations and organizations have sought or claimed apostolic succession through excommunicated Latin Catholic bishops and wandering bishops of Anglican and Orthodox traditions including Carlos Duarte Costa, Arnold Mathew, Joseph Vilatte, Aftimios Ofiesh, and others in order to preserve doctrinal and apostolic continuity and establish sacramental legitimacy. The following positions on holy orders and apostolic succession from these bishops' previous churches have been stated below:

=== Roman Catholicism ===
According to Roman Catholic teaching, such ordinations—even if performed by excommunicated, deposed, and laicized bishops—are "valid but illicit." The Code of Canon Law within the Roman Catholic Church states Latin and Eastern Catholic bishops are able to ordain in holy orders, yet ordinations without authorization are deemed illicit and result in automatic excommunication (and for some, laicization, e.g., Emmanuel Milingo).

There is also an understanding through Roman Catholic teaching on sacramental character; dogma teaches those performing unauthorized ceremonies cannot have their holy orders or episcopal genealogy (apostolic succession) nullified, vacated or revoked though their use of the sacraments go unrecognized among those in communion with the Pope of Rome, as they have only been relieved of episcopal duties within the Latin Catholic Church and its Eastern Catholic Churches specifically. The Catechism of the Catholic Church (1992), §1121 expresses:

The three sacraments of Baptism, Confirmation, and Holy Orders confer, in addition to grace, a sacramental character or seal by which the Christian shares in Christ's priesthood and is made a member of the Church according to different states and functions. This configuration to Christ and to the Church, brought about by the Spirit, is indelible; it remains for ever in the Christian as a positive disposition for grace, a promise and guarantee of divine protection, and as a vocation to divine worship and to the service of the Church. Therefore these sacraments can never be repeated.

=== Eastern Orthodoxy ===
From mainstream Eastern Orthodox teaching no holy orders outside of their churches are generally recognized considering a strict adherence to the letter of the law (see also: legalism), although some mainstream Eastern Orthodox churches may consider outside holy orders as valid and forgo conditional ordinations via divine economy. The Ecumenical Patriarchate of Constantinople, for example, teaches through "extreme oikonomia [economy]", those who are baptized in the following traditions can be received into the Eastern Orthodox Church through the sacrament of Chrismation and not through re-baptism:

- Oriental Orthodox
- Roman Catholic
- Old Catholic
- Moravian
- Lutheran
- Anglican
- Methodist (except the Salvation Army (Note: The Salvation Army does not observe the sacraments of Baptism and Holy Communion as they believe the rituals are not necessary to experience the inward grace of which the sacraments are outward signs.))
- United Church of Christ
- Presbyterian
- Baptist
- Church of the Brethren
- Assemblies of God

This is also because each autocephalous church determines the validity of another Christian church's holy orders and other sacraments, according to a joint Eastern Orthodox-Roman Catholic ordination committee in 1988. In the 20th century, specifically, there have even been bishops elevated by and descending from Aftimios Ofiesh of the American Orthodox Catholic Church, which were brought into the mainstream Eastern Orthodox churches without reordination (e.g., bishops Joseph Zuk and Alexander Turner).

=== Oriental Orthodoxy ===
According to Oriental Orthodox theology, ordination confers an imperishable character that cannot be removed; therefore, bishops ordained through the Oriental Orthodox Churches such as Vilatte were considered to have sacramental character (even though he was later excommunicated by Ignatius Peter IV).

=== Anglicanism ===
In Anglicanism, similar to Roman Catholic and Oriental Orthodox theology, it is taught "once a bishop, always a bishop." Anglicanism also teaches the permanent effect of sacramental character; the 39 Articles of Religion teaches unworthy ministers are still able to validly confect the sacraments, even if under canonical discipline.

According to An Episcopal Dictionary of the Church, which has been published by American Episcopalians:

In the same way, medieval scholastics held that confirmation and ordination conferred indelible character. Contemporary Anglican theology appears to reject this view in the case of Confirmation, recognizing no separate character of Confirmation apart from the baptismal character. Although the Episcopal Church makes no such specific claim about ordination, it acts as though ordination were indelible. One who has abandoned or renounced the ordained ministry, or even been deposed from it, is not reordained if he or she is reinstated. Instead, the person is formally restored to the order already held.

Within the Church of England, its canons teach that even if voluntarily relinquishing the office or position, or being deprived from the exercise of the same, "no person who has been admitted to the order of bishop, priest, or deacon can ever be divested of the character of his order."

== Statistics ==
Through the establishment of multiple denominations in the Convergence Movement, more than 20 million individuals have been claimed as adherents of its multiple organizations. According to self-reported statistics in 2025, the largest denomination in the movement was the Evangelical Episcopal Communion with approximately 15 million members in more than 5,000 churches through its Province of St. Peter; and over 100 churches and ministries altogether through Missio Mosaic and the Province of India.

The second largest-denomination in the movement was the Holy Communion of Churches with approximately 4.6 million members in 700 churches as of 2020. The third-largest denomination in the movement was the Continuing Evangelical Episcopal Communion (reconstituted as the Confessing Anglican Church)—reporting an estimated 2,100,000 members and 10,703 churches as of 2023.

Following, the Charismatic Episcopal Church with more than 1,600 churches as of 2008, and almost 2,000 as of 2014, was the movement's fifth-largest. The Communion of Evangelical Episcopal Churches had 150+ churches and ministries through its provinces and U.S. dioceses. As of 2024, the African Episcopal Church claimed more than 43 churches through its U.S. and international provinces and dioceses; and the Union of Charismatic Orthodox Churches had an estimated 24 churches as of 2020.

== Denominations ==
The following is not a complete list, but aims to provide a comprehensible overview of the diversity among denominations of Convergence Christianity.

- Apostolic Pastoral Congress
- Charismatic Episcopal Church
- Communion of Evangelical Episcopal Churches
- Confessing Anglican Church
- Evangelical Episcopal Communion
- Holy Communion of Churches
- Union of Charismatic Orthodox Churches

== See also ==
- Paleo-orthodoxy
- Anglican realignment
- Ecumenism
- Evangelical Catholic
- Hebrew Roots
- Independent sacramental movement
- New religious movement
- Open evangelicalism
