= Timothy Paul Baymon =

American bishop

The Most Reverend Timothy Paul
- Patriarch of the Holy Communion of Churches
- Installed: September 2007
- Term ended: Incumbent

Orders
- Consecration: August, 1999 by Peter Paul Brennan, Carl Jimenez, James Lagona and Joseph Grenier

Personal details
- Born: Timothy Baymon
- Spouse: Sandra Baymon

Timothy Paul (secular name Timothy Baymon) is the founder and first patriarch of the Holy Communion of Churches (formerly, the Holy Christian Orthodox Church), a Christian denomination within the Convergence Movement. Having served as president of the World Bishops Council—an ecumenical body of Christian churches and their prelates—he also became the founder and senior pastor of the Christian Cathedral in Springfield, Massachusetts.

== Biography ==
Timothy Paul was born in Springfield, Massachusetts, and raised in the Church of God in Christ—a historically and predominantly African American, Protestant Christian denomination.

In 1991, he became pastor of the Christian Cathedral—initially known as Praise and Glory Church.

By August 1999, he was elevated into the episcopacy by Peter Paul Brennan, Carl Jimenez, James Lagona and Joseph Grenier. In 2000, he received a subconditional episcopal consecration by Herman R. Cannady—being received into the Coptic and Ethiopian Orthodox succession.

After his episcopal elevation, Baymon, Yvette Flunder, Brennan and George Augustus Stallings sat in the executive college of the World Bishops Council as late as 2007. By 2010, his presidential term ended over the World Bishops Council.

Since his episcopal consecration, he has also served on a police oversight board. Baymon joined the New England Partners in Faith, and served two terms as president of the Council of Churches of Western Massachusetts.

In 2003, Baymon and the World Bishops Council denounced universalism, and also publicly criticized the teachings of Carlton Pearson, whom the council judged to be heretical.

In 2004, Baymon signed a letter with 28 other religious leaders in support of religious freedom in Iraq. Representing the World Bishops Council at the United Nations Department of Public Information/Non-Governmental Organization Conference—now known as the United Nations Civil Society Conference—Baymon urged Christians to "become greater stewards of the earth" by conserving energy, reducing greenhouse gases and deforestation, and creating public and private partnerships which will lead to renewable energy sources.

Timothy Paul with then-coadjutor William Eusebius Brown, 2006

In March 2005, Baymon was incardinated for the Ukrainian Orthodox Church – Kyiv Patriarchate, through its USA mission. During his incardination, Baymon was neither received nor recognized as a bishop, rather, as an archpriest.

Baymon founded Epiphany Development Corporation, which, in 2006, announced the planned construction of a $10 million boutique hotel at the Epiphany Tower building in Springfield, Massachusetts.

In 2017, Baymon and the Holy Communion of Churches filed a lawsuit against the Epiphany Tower owner. In 2018, the hotel planned by Baymon and his church opened.

As of 2020, documents leaked regarding Baymon and his denomination's involvement with offshore shell companies.

== Holy Communion of Churches ==
Holy Communion of Churches
- Abbreviation: HCOC
- Type: Convergence
- Classification: Western Christian
- Orientation: Protestant
- Scripture: Christian Bible
- Theology: Clerical marriage, Ecumenism, Paleo-orthodoxy, Women's ordination
- Polity: Episcopal
- Governance: Holy Synod
- Patriarch: Timothy Paul Baymon
- Region: North America, South America, Africa, Asia
- Headquarters: Springfield, Massachusetts
- Founder: Timothy Paul Baymon
- Origin: 2000
- Churches: 700 (2020)
- Members: 4.6 million (2020)
- Other name: Holy Christian Orthodox Church

The Holy Communion of Churches, formerly known as the Holy Christian Orthodox Church (HCOC) is a predominantly African American Christian denomination established in the United States of America by Timothy Paul Baymon. As part of the Convergence Movement, it gleams toward Eastern Christianity and Pentecostalism.

Its founder claimed that Orthodox Christianity was brought to African Americans through the Holy Communion of Churches, with foreign outreach in Gambia, India, Kenya and Zambia; and according to Baymon, the Holy Communion of Churches consisted of approximately 700 churches, altogether numbering a self-reported 4.6 million members as of 2020. Previously, George Alexander McGuire and the African Orthodox Church attempted to introduce Orthodox Christianity to African Americans in the 20th century.

=== Doctrine and practice ===
The denomination's founder asserted that "like the Russian or Greek orthodox churches", "the denomination follows the original interpretations of the early apostles."

The Holy Communion of Churches believes that it follows Orthodox Christianity inasmuch as its patristic origins, while—in contrast with mainstream Eastern Orthodox tradition—ordaining women to the presbyterate and episcopate, a practice deemed uncanonical and unbiblical by the Eastern Orthodox Church, Oriental Orthodoxy, and Eastern Catholic Churches in union with Rome.

Within the Holy Communion of Churches Book of Liturgies, liturgies and sacraments are performed according to the Liturgy of Saint James, Western Rite Orthodox liturgies, and the 1928 Book of Common Prayer. Some of its liturgical acts are a syncretism of the Syriac Orthodox, Western Rite Orthodox, and Anglican traditions.

The Holy Communion of Churches incardinates and confers its holy orders upon Baptists, Pentecostals, and others—reconstituting their organizations as autocephalous and autonomous dioceses and archdioceses, and provinces. Each member church is allowed to retain their identities and charisms.
