= Tony Palmer (bishop) =

South African Protestant bishop

The Right Reverend Tony Palmer
- Bishop
- Church: Communion of Evangelical Episcopal Churches

Personal details
- Born: Anthony Joseph Palmer; 4 February 1966
- Died: 20 July 2014 (aged 48)
- Occupation: Pastor

Tony Palmer, born Anthony Joseph Palmer, (4 February 1966 – 20 July 2014) was a British-born South African theologian, missiologist, missionary and author. He served as a bishop within the Communion of Evangelical Episcopal Churches, and held informal ecumenical dialogue with the Roman Catholic Church through Pope Francis until his death.

== Biography ==
Palmer was born in the United Kingdom and moved to South Africa when he was 10 years old. He and his wife maintained a website, called the Ark Community, which is described as "an internet-based, Inter-denominational Christian Convergent Community, drawing our spirituality from the 'Early Church' (33–600 AD), in particular, Celtic Christian spirituality." On the Ark Community website he was known as "Father Tony Palmer" instead of using the style The Right Reverend or the title "bishop". Through this religious community, Palmer served as a bishop of the Communion of Evangelical Episcopal Churches. He was married to Emilia Palmer. He was a father and also a godfather.

In January 2014, he was sent by Pope Francis to a Charismatic Christian conference hosted by televangelist Kenneth Copeland. Bishops Palmer and Emilio Alvarez participated in "The Miracle of Unity". On 20 July 2014, after injuries sustained in a motorbike accident, Palmer died.
