= Habel =

Habel can refer to:

- an alternate spelling of biblical figure Abel, of the brothers Cain and Abel
- Dorothy Habel, American historian
- Sarah Habel, American actress
- St. Habel of Kaipetta, Indian convert from Hinduism to Christianity
