= Union of Charismatic Orthodox Churches =

- Seal of the UCOC
- Abbreviation: UCOC
- Classification: Protestant
- Orientation: Convergence
- Polity: Episcopal
- Structure: Communion
- Archbishop: Emilio Alvarez
- Region: International
- Headquarters: Rochester, New York
- Origin: 2019
- Congregations: 24
- Official website: theucoc.org

The Union of Charismatic Orthodox Churches (UCOC) is a predominantly African American and Hispanic/Latino Christian denomination forming part of the Convergence Movement. Established in Painted Post, New York, on July 31, 2019, the UCOC describes itself as a union "embracing a multiplicity of Protestant and catholic expressions of worship and practice." Most of its churches are located in the Northern United States.

== History ==
On July 31, 2019, the Union of Charismatic Orthodox Churches was formed in New York State, with the Emilio Alvarez unanimously elected as interim prelate; on October 20, 2020 during its first synod, Alvarez was elected to lead the UCOC as its primate. In December 2020, Alvarez and the Union of Charismatic Orthodox Churches was hosted by Archbishop Elpidophoros of the Greek Orthodox Archdiocese of America. In 2021, Alvarez was installed as the archbishop and primate for the Union of Charismatic Orthodox Churches.

== Statistics ==
As of 2020, the Union of Charismatic Orthodox Churches had approximately 24 churches spread throughout the Northeast United States.

== Worship and doctrine ==
Within the Union of Charismatic Orthodox Churches, worship reflects the principles of the Convergence Movement. Its clergy dress in vestments and clerical garments, lead the faithful through the collect, and the Eucharist. Churches within the UCOC also follow a liturgical calendar; accept the Nicene, Apostles' and Athanasian creeds; and worship has been structured with lessons from the 1979 Book of Common Prayer, alongside Eastern Orthodox and Roman Catholic liturgies. In common with most Convergence Christian bodies except the Charismatic Episcopal Church, the UCOC affirms the ordination of women.

== See also ==
- Convergence Movement
- Paleo-orthodoxy
