= Patriarchate of Antioch (disambiguation) =

The Patriarchate of Antioch is the office and jurisdiction of the bishop or Patriarch of Antioch.

Several groups have claimed succession of the early Church of Antioch:

- Syriac Orthodox Patriarchate of Antioch, est. 512 in Antioch and later relocated to Eastern Anatolia, then Homs, then Damascus
- Syriac Catholic Patriarchate of Antioch, est. 1662 in Damascus
- Maronite Catholic Patriarchate of Antioch, est. 685 in the Qadisha Valley, later relocated while remaining in what is now Lebanon
- Greek Orthodox Patriarchate of Antioch, relocated to Damascus in the 14th century
- Melkite Catholic Patriarchate of Antioch, est. 1724 in Damascus
- Latin Patriarchate of Antioch, est. 1098 as a Catholic see in Antioch, titular from 1268 until suppression in 1964
- Catholic Apostolic Patriarchate of Antioch, est. 1958 in Berlin, Germany

== See also ==
- Patriarchate
