= Christopher Hall (theologian) =

American Episcopal theologian (born 1950)

- Born: Christopher Alan Hall; 1950 (age 75–76)

Academic background
- Education: University of California, Los Angeles; Fuller Theological Seminary; Regent College; Drew University
- Thesis: John Chrysostom's "On Providence": A Translation and Theological Interpretation (1991)

Academic work
- Discipline: Theology
- Sub-discipline: Patristics
- School or tradition: Anglicanism; paleo-orthodoxy
- Institutions: Eastern University

Christopher Alan Hall (born 1950) is an Episcopalian theologian and a leading exponent of paleo-orthodox theology. He was the Chancellor of Eastern University, the dean of the Templeton Honors College, and, together with the United Methodist theologian Thomas C. Oden, another paleo-orthodox scholar, he edits the Ancient Christian Commentary on Scripture. He has stated that his goal as a theologian is, "to introduce modern Christians to the world of the early church, particularly because the Holy Spirit has a history."

Hall and his wife Debbie have three children: Nathan, Nathalie, and Joshua.

== Publications ==
- Ancient Christian Commentary on Scripture series, Associate editor with Thomas C. Oden (InterVarsity Press, Ongoing)
- Ancient Christian Commentary on Scripture: The Gospel of Mark, with Thomas C. Oden, (InterVarsity Press, June, 1998) ISBN 9780830814183
- Reading Scripture with the Church Fathers (InterVarsity Press, September, 1998) ISBN 9780830815005
- Realized Religion: Research on Religion and Health, with Theodore Chamberlain (Templeton Foundation Press, 2000) ISBN 9781890151454
- Ancient and Postmodern Christianity: Paleo-Orthodoxy in the 21st Century (Essays In Honor of Thomas C. Oden), with Kenneth Tanner (IVP, 2002) ISBN 9780830826544
- Learning Theology with the Church Fathers (InterVarsity Press, 2002) ISBN 9780830826865
- Olson, Roger E.; Hall, Christopher A. (2002). The Trinity. Grand Rapids, Michigan: William B. Eerdmans Publishing Company.
- Worshiping with the Church Fathers (InterVarsity Press, 2009) ISBN 9780830838660
- Does God Have a Future: A Debate on Divine Providence, with John Sanders (Baker Academic, 2003) ISBN 9780801026041
- Making Room for God: Spiritual Formation for Christian Leaders with David Fraser (The Center for Organizational Excellence, 1997)
