= Lists of popes, patriarchs, primates, archbishops, and bishops =

This is a directory of patriarchs, archbishops, and bishops across various Christian denominations. To find an individual who was a bishop, see the most relevant article linked below or Category:Bishops.

== Lists ==
=== Catholic ===
- Bishops in the Catholic Church
- Hierarchy of the Catholic Church
- List of bishops and prince-bishops of Liège
- List of Catholic archdioceses (by country and continent)
- List of Catholic bishops in Australia
- List of Catholic bishops in Great Britain
- List of Catholic bishops in Japan
- List of Catholic bishops in the Philippines
- List of Catholic bishops in the United States
- List of Catholic bishops of India
- List of Catholic dioceses (alphabetical) (including archdioceses) (in the world)
- List of Catholic dioceses (structured view) (including archdioceses) (in the world)
- List of current cardinals (sortable by name, country, and birthdate)
- List of popes

=== Eastern Orthodox ===
- List of Eastern Orthodox bishops in the United States and Canada
- List of bishops and archbishops of Novgorod
- List of Eastern Orthodox bishops and archbishops
- List of heads of the Serbian Orthodox Church
- List of metropolitans and patriarchs of Moscow
- List of primates of the Orthodox Church in America

=== Oriental Orthodox ===
- List of abunas of Eritrea
- List of abunas of Ethiopia
- List of Armenian catholicoi of Cilicia
- List of Armenian patriarchs of Constantinople
- List of Armenian patriarchs of Jerusalem
- List of catholicoi of all Armenians
- List of Caucasian Albanian catholicoi
- List of Coptic Orthodox popes
- List of maphrians
- List of metropolitans of the Indian Orthodox Church
- List of Syriac Orthodox patriarchs of Antioch

=== Protestant ===
- List of Anglican Communion dioceses
  - List of current Anglican primates
  - List of bishops in the Church of England
  - List of bishops of the Episcopal Church in the United States of America
  - List of presiding bishops of the Episcopal Church in the United States of America
- List of Lutheran dioceses and archdioceses
- List of bishops of the Anglican Church in North America
- List of bishops of the North American Lutheran Church
- List of bishops of the Reformed Episcopal Church
- List of bishops of the United Methodist Church
- List of Charismatic Episcopal Church bishops

== See also ==
- Patriarch
- Cardinal
- Archbishop
- Bishop
- Resident Bishop (United Methodist)
- Diocese
- Lists of office-holders
- Ecclesiastical polity (church governance)
  - Congregationalist polity
  - Episcopal polity
  - Presbyterian polity
- List of lists of popes
