= Paleo movement =

Paleo movement may refer to:

- Paleoconservatism
- Paleolibertarianism
- Paleolithic lifestyle
- Paleo-orthodoxy
