= Andrew Purves =

Scottish Christian theologian (born 1946)

The Reverend Andrew Purves
- Born: 1946 (age 79–80); Edinburgh, Scotland
- Spouse: Cathy Purves

Ecclesiastical career
- Religion: Christianity (Presbyterian)
- Church: Presbyterian Church (USA)
- Ordained: 1979

Academic background
- Education: University of Edinburgh; Duke University
- Influences: Athanasius of Alexandria; Karl Barth; John Calvin; Jürgen Moltmann; T. F. Torrance

Academic work
- Discipline: Theology
- Sub-discipline: Christology; historical theology
- School or tradition: Paleo-orthodoxy
- Institutions: Pittsburgh Theological Seminary

Andrew Purves (born 1946) is a Scottish theologian in the Reformed tradition through the Church of Scotland (and later, the Presbyterian Church (USA)). He holds the Chair in Reformed Theology at Pittsburgh Theological Seminary.

A native of Edinburgh, Scotland, Purves earned degrees in philosophy and divinity from the University of Edinburgh, and a Master of Theology degree from Duke Divinity School. His Doctor of Philosophy degree is from the University of Edinburgh. In Scotland, he studied under Thomas F. Torrance. Torrance, his brother James Torrance, Athanasius, John Calvin, Karl Barth, and Jürgen Moltmann were all important influences in Purves' theological development.

Originally a member of the Church of Scotland, Purves moved to the United States in 1978 and was ordained in 1979. He served as pastor of the Hebron Presbyterian Church in Clinton, Pennsylvania, until 1983 when he began teaching at Pittsburgh Theological Seminary.

Purves' primary concerns surround Christology. He continually argues for a vital connection between the person and work of Jesus Christ in his vicarious humanity and the Christian life; a connection founded upon the believer's union with Christ.

Much of Purves' work is a call to reclaim the classical, Christological tradition of the church, thereby renewing the church through traditional doctrine and the wisdom of the patristic writers. Some associate him with the paleo-orthodox movement. He has become a leader of evangelical renewal in the PCUSA and has become known in that denomination for his support of views concerning the person and work of Jesus Christ.

He is married to Catherine Purves, a Presbyterian minister in her own right. They have three children: Brendan, Gordon, and Laura.

== Works ==
- The Search for Compassion: Spirituality and Ministry ISBN 0-664-25065-3
- Pastoral Theology in the Classical Tradition ISBN 0-664-22241-2
- Union in Christ (with Mark Achtemeier) ISBN 1-57153-019-3
- Encountering God: Christian Faith in Turbulent Times (with Charles Partee) ISBN 0-664-22242-0
- Reconstructing Pastoral Theology: A Christological Foundation ISBN 0-664-22733-3
- "The Trinitarian Basis of a Christian Practical Theology" in The International Journal of Practical Theology
- The Crucifixion of Ministry ISBN 978-0-8308-3439-6
- The Resurrection of Ministry ISBN 978-0-8308-3741-0
