= Evangelical Episcopal Communion =

Christian denomination (2015-)

- Seal of the EEC
- Abbreviation: EEC
- Classification: Western Christian
- Orientation: Convergence
- Polity: Episcopal
- Presiding Bishop: Page Brooks
- Region: International
- Founder: Russell McClanahan
- Origin: 1995
- Separated from: Communion of Evangelical Episcopal Churches
- Congregations: 5,100+
- Members: 15,000,000~ (self-reported, 2025)
- Official website: globaleec.org

The Evangelical Episcopal Communion (EEC) is a Christian denomination within the Convergence Movement, formerly part of the Communion of Evangelical Episcopal Churches. The denomination was founded by Archbishop Russell McClanahan, who has served as presiding bishop and patriarch. He was succeeded by Archbishop Page Brooks.

== History ==
Russell McClanahan was consecrated into the episcopacy in 1995, within Fredericksburg, Virginia. By 1999, McClanahan was elected to the archiepiscopacy for the communion's Province of St. Peter, and in March 1999, his jurisdiction officially joined the Communion of Evangelical Episcopal Churches. He also became the third presiding bishop for the Communion of Evangelical Episcopal Churches in 2003.

In 2015, McClanahan and the Province of St. Peter unanimously separated citing philosophical and functional changes regarding provincial authority within the communion. Following, the Province of St. Peter; Province of India under Archbishop Reinhard Shakar; and Province of South Africa under Archbishop Lazarus Selahle operated as the "Evangelical Episcopal Communion." By October 2019, the Evangelical Episcopal Communion reunited with the Communion of Evangelical Episcopal Churches.

As of 2021, the Evangelical Episcopal Communion separated again from the Communion of Evangelical Episcopal Churches.

In 2025, the Evangelical Episcopal Communion formally established an ecclesiastical province for India, and a new African jurisdiction was received; during their annual synod, the communion claimed to embrace approximately 15 million members. Archbishop Russell McClanahan was succeeded as the presiding bishop by Archbishop Page Brooks, a former Baptist pastor.

By 2026, the Evangelical Episcopal Communion established a partnership with the Anglican Mission Society Global, which included: Sospeter Temeo Ndenza of the Anglican Diocese of Kibondo (Tanzania), Zacharie Masimango Katanda of the Anglican Diocese of Kindu (Congo), Melter Tais of the Anglican Diocese of Sabah (South East Asia), and Emmanuel Kolini of the Anglican Diocese of Kigali (Rwanda) as partner bishops.

== Statistics ==
As of December 2025 to June 2026, the Evangelical Episcopal Communion self-reported approximately 15 million members; the denomination claimed that its newly constituted Indian province had approximately 9 million members, while its newly received African jurisdiction claimed more than 3 million members altogether.

According to the EEC's website in 2023, the denomination was organized into the following provinces: the Province of St. Peter; Family Life International Fellowship; Master's Circle Christian Fellowship International; and Missio Mosaic. The largest of the provinces was the Province of St. Peter, claiming to have planted more than 5,000 churches. Missio Mosaic had listed 9 churches and ministries altogether as parish churches, network churches, and ministries. Though strengthening ties with the Communion of Evangelical Episcopal Churches, Archbishop Reinhard Shakar's Indian province claimed more than 100 churches in May 2023. Prior to Archbishop Lazarus Selahle's death as head of the Province of South Africa and All Africa Bishops Council, his province claimed 12 bishops.

== Doctrine ==
As a part of the Convergence Movement, the Evangelical Episcopal Communion adheres to the Chicago-Lambeth Quadrilateral. The EEC rejects same-sex marriages and abortions.
