= Cleophus Robinson =

American singer (1932–1998)

The Reverend Cleophus Robinson (March 18, 1932, Canton, Mississippi – July 2, 1998, Saint Louis, Missouri) was an American gospel singer and preacher. He hosted a gospel television series which ran for over 20 years. He was often referred to as "The World's Greatest Gospel Singer".

== Biography ==
Cleophus Robinson was born March 18, 1932, in Canton, Mississippi. His mother, Lillie, was a well known gospel singer in the region. Robinson first performed solo as a teenager at St. John's Church in Canton. In 1948, he moved to Chicago, where he sang at churches, as well as appearing with the Roberta Martin Singers and Mahalia Jackson.

In September 1949 he made his first recordings for Miracle Records. as Bro Cleophus Robinson. He then relocated to Memphis. After graduating from Mananass High School, He began a weekly radio show, The Voice of the Soul. During this time he began collaborating with pianist Napoleon Brown, in a partnership which would span several decades.

In 1953, Robinson joined Peacock Records, releasing the single "In the Sweet By and By". After several more unsuccessful releases, he decided to pursue acting, but found his studies interrupted by record promotion, and after a year he returned to music. By 1956, Robinson's career had stalled. A year later, he moved to St. Louis, Missouri, working at the Bethlehem Missionary Baptist Church as pastor for over 40 years. His on and off recording schedule with Peacock ended with the 1962 release of Pray for Me, recorded with his sister Josephine James. Robinson also hosted his Hour of Faith weekly radio program. In 1964, he started a gospel television show.

In 1962, Robinson signed with Battle Records, a subsidiary of Riverside. He returned to Peacock in 1964. His first new release with them, "Solemn Prayer," was a sermon record which became a major seller. Later that year, he switched to Savoy Records, releasing the hit "How Sweet It Is to Be Loved by God". At the end of 1965, he again returned to Peacock, and changed his style to one more blues-influenced. He toured Europe, and switched to Nashboro Records in 1969. With Nashboro, he released his biggest hit, "Wrapped Up, Tied Up, Tangled Up." The single enjoyed crossover success with a white audience. He returned to Savoy in the 1970s. In 1975, he appeared at the Montreux Jazz Festival in Switzerland. In 1980, he sang at the White House, and in 1986 released the hit "Save a Seat for Me."

== Influence ==
He was initiated into the Mississippi Musicians Hall of Fame. Sterling Lands II is a musical protégé of Robinson's.

== Discography ==
- Rev. Cleophus Robinson with Jessy Dixon & the Gospel Chimes, Battle Records (1962)
- God's Sons and Daughters, Peacock (1965)
- Rev. Cleophus Robinson Sings Songs of Mahalia Jackson, Nashboro Records 7127 (1973)
- Poor Boy From Mississippi, Nashboro (1974)
- Live From Europe, Nashboro (1978)
- Saved And Satisfied, Nashboro (1979)
- Oh Lord, You Said So, Savoy Records (1980)
- The Lord Takes Care of Everybody, Savoy Records 14601 (1981)
