= Charismatic Episcopal Church =

Christian denomination established in 1992

International Communion of the Charismatic Episcopal Church
- Emblem of the Charismatic Episcopal Church
- Abbreviation: CEC, ICCEC
- Classification: Western Christian
- Orientation: Convergence
- Polity: Episcopal
- Patriarch: Charles William Jones
- Region: International
- Headquarters: Malverne, New York
- Origin: 1992
- Congregations: 100+
- Official website: iccec.org

The Charismatic Episcopal Church (CEC), officially the International Communion of the Charismatic Episcopal Church (ICCEC), is a Christian denomination established in 1992. The ICCEC is a part of the Convergence Movement. Within North America, most of the Charismatic Episcopal Church's congregations and missions are located within the Northern, Southeastern, Midwest, and Western United States; it also has a presence in Texas, and in Western Canada.

== History ==
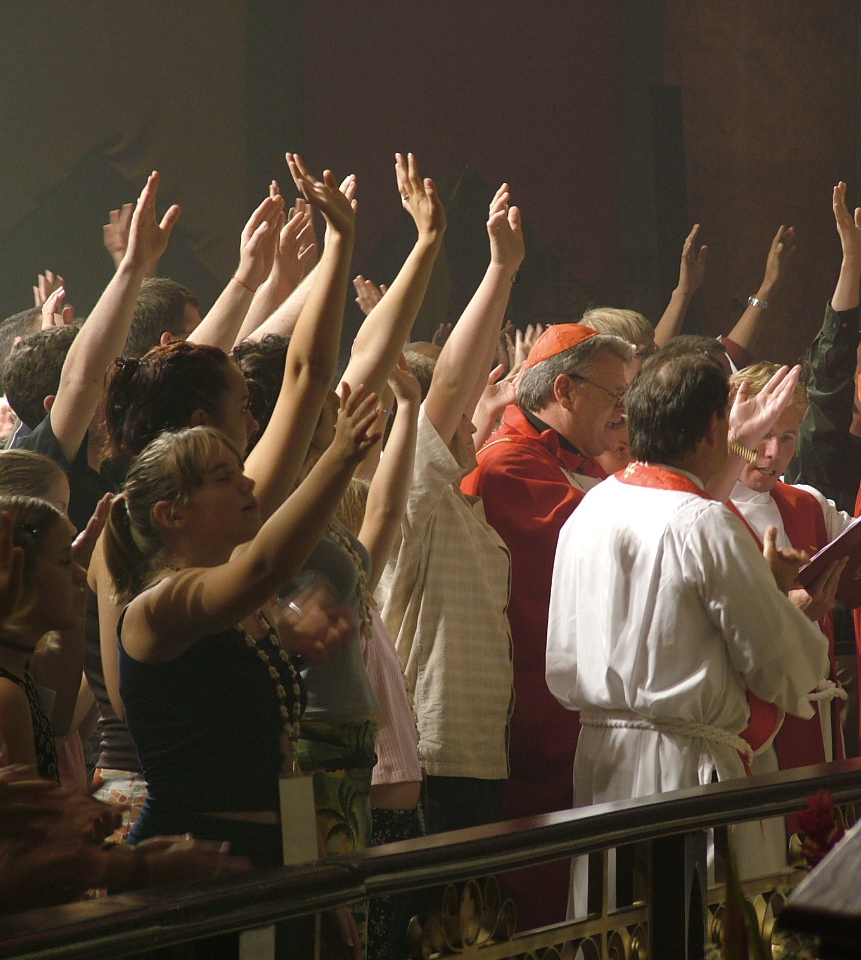
Mass at the Cathedral of the King in Manila

=== Convergence background ===
The Charismatic Episcopal Church began when a variety of independent churches throughout the United States, as part of the Convergence Movement, began to blend evangelical teaching and charismatic worship with liturgies from the Book of Common Prayer inspired by the spiritual pilgrimages of modern Evangelical Protestant writers like Thomas Howard, Robert E. Webber, Peter E. Gillquist and the ancient Christian writers and their communities. These men, along with theologians, scripture scholars, and pastors in a number of traditions, were calling Christians back to their roots in the primitive church.

=== Establishment and growth ===
On June 26, 1992, Randolph Adler was consecrated the first bishop and primate of the ICCEC with Timothy Michael Barker of the International Free Catholic Communion—who was consecrated by Archbishop-Patriarch Herman Adrian Spruit and his wife functioning as the principal consecrator, both clergy of the Catholic Apostolic Church of Antioch, an Independent Catholic jurisdiction.

A few years after the consecration of Adler, the ICCEC's clergy began to express concern about Barker's embrace of theological liberalism, Gnosticism, Theosophy, non-traditional sexual ethics, and the ordination of women to the priesthood, all of which are contrary to ICCEC beliefs. In 1996, Adler was named the communion's first patriarch. In 1997, the ICCEC sought and acquired consecration and ordination of all of its clergy by the Brazilian Catholic Apostolic Church through the episcopal genealogy of Carlos Duarte Costa.

The ICCEC adopted the following vision statement: "The Charismatic Episcopal Church exists to make visible the Kingdom of God; to bring the rich sacramental and liturgical life of the early church to searching evangelicals and charismatics; to carry the power of Pentecost to our brothers and sisters in the historic churches; and finally, to provide a home for all Christians who seek a liturgical-sacramental, evangelical, charismatic church and a foundation for their lives and gifts of ministry." The ICCEC experienced rapid growth for the first ten years of its existence, however the U.S. growth rate plateaued at the beginning of the 21st century.

==== Schism into Antioch and Rome ====
In 2006, the U.S. church experienced a crisis resulting in the departure of approximately 30% of its clergy and congregations, including seven actively serving bishops and one retired bishop. The crisis stemmed from allegations against some ICCEC leadership in America. These allegations were heard and adjudicated in June and September 2006 by the Patriarch's Council. In September 2006, the council issued a statement of its findings, which was then followed by several more U.S. departures. Some of the departing clergy and congregations found new homes within the Antiochian Greek Orthodox Church as Western rite clergy and parishes, and some entered full communion with the Roman Catholic Church through the Personal Ordinariate of the Chair of Saint Peter.

=== Since 2006–2007 schism ===
On October 15, 2007, at a scheduled patriarch's council meeting, the patriarch, Randolph Adler, requested to retire as patriarch of the ICCEC and as primate of the United States. The council accepted his request, expressing gratitude for all he had done in the formation and launching of the vision which led to the ICCEC. Archbishop Hines of the Philippines, as senior bishop on the patriarch's council, was appointed as acting patriarch (supervising bishop) for the ICCEC until a formal election could be held. On January 9, 2008, Archbishop Hines announced that the patriarch's council, in accordance with the canons, had elected Craig W. Bates as the ICCEC's new patriarch. On July 30, 2008, during the ICCEC's 4th International Convocation, Bates was enthroned as the second patriarch and primate of the ICCEC in North America. The celebration was presided over by Loren Thomas Hines, Archbishop of Manila and the ICCEC's primate in the Philippines and Asia.

== Statistics ==
In 2008, the Charismatic Episcopal Church claimed more than 1,600 churches altogether. By 2014, it had an estimated 2,000 churches. In 2023, its international provinces claimed more than 34 churches and missions throughout Europe, Africa, and Asia.

== Doctrine ==
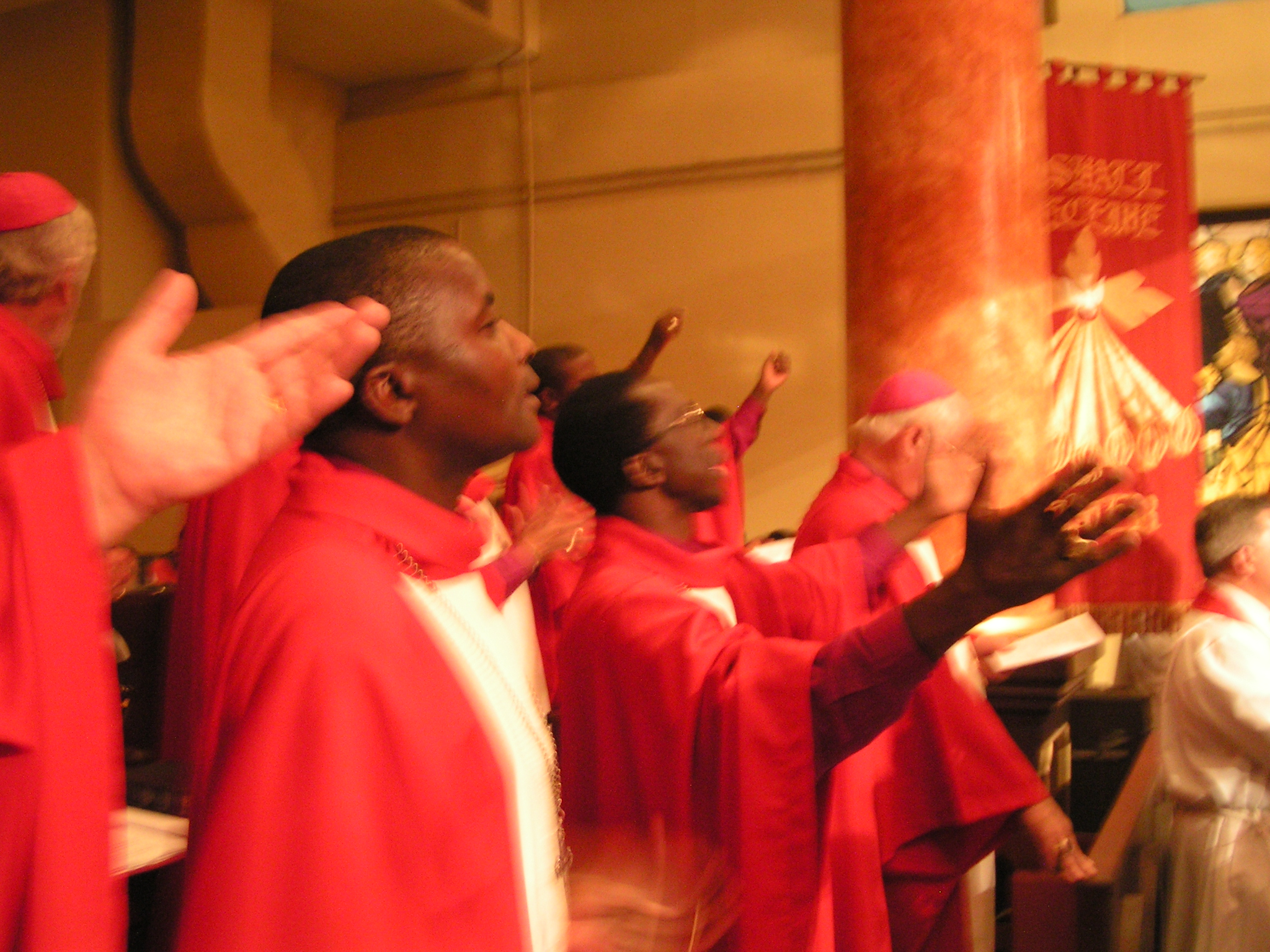
African bishops

The ICCEC believes in the dogmatic statements of the seven ecumenical councils of the state church of Rome, apostolic succession, the real presence of Christ in the Eucharist, the authority of scripture, and the validity of the charismatic revival as a genuine movement of God. The ICCEC accepts the Protestant canon of the Old and New Testament as the Word of God, containing all things necessary to salvation. The additional deuterocanonical books may be read in public worship, but are not used to formulate dogma or doctrine. The Charismatic Episcopal Church also forbids the ordination of women.

In September 2006, the Patriarch's Council began an initiative to establish an official Catechism of the International Communion of the Charismatic Episcopal Church, designating the catechism of the American Book of Common Prayer (1979) as a starting point. The council's stated goal was that the new catechism would reflect the fullness of the ancient catholic and orthodox faith, and the Reformation, as it is expressed in the world contemporarily. The Catechism of the ICCEC has been made publicly available through the internet.

=== San Clemente Declaration ===
In 1999 the ICCEC issued The San Clemente Declaration, a statement of principles governing the ICCEC's communion with other Christian bodies. The articles of the declaration are as follows:

In earnest anticipation for a future revelation of the fullness of unity of the one, holy, catholic and apostolic Church, the International Communion of the Charismatic Episcopal Church adheres to these articles of unity exemplified by the undivided Catholic Church during the first eleven centuries:

1. The sacred Scriptures of the Old and New Testaments as the written Word of God, the chief witness to apostolic teaching, the source of the Church's nourishment and strength.
2. The Apostles Creed as the Baptismal symbol; and the Nicene Creed as the sufficient statement of the Christian faith.
3. The Seven Sacraments established by Christ, including: Baptism, Eucharist, Confirmation, Confession/Reconciliation, Holy Matrimony, Holy Orders, Healing/Unction.
4. The Historic Episcopate in Apostolic Succession, the gift of Christ's authority to the Church and the trustee of the Church's fidelity to apostolic teaching.

=== Worship ===
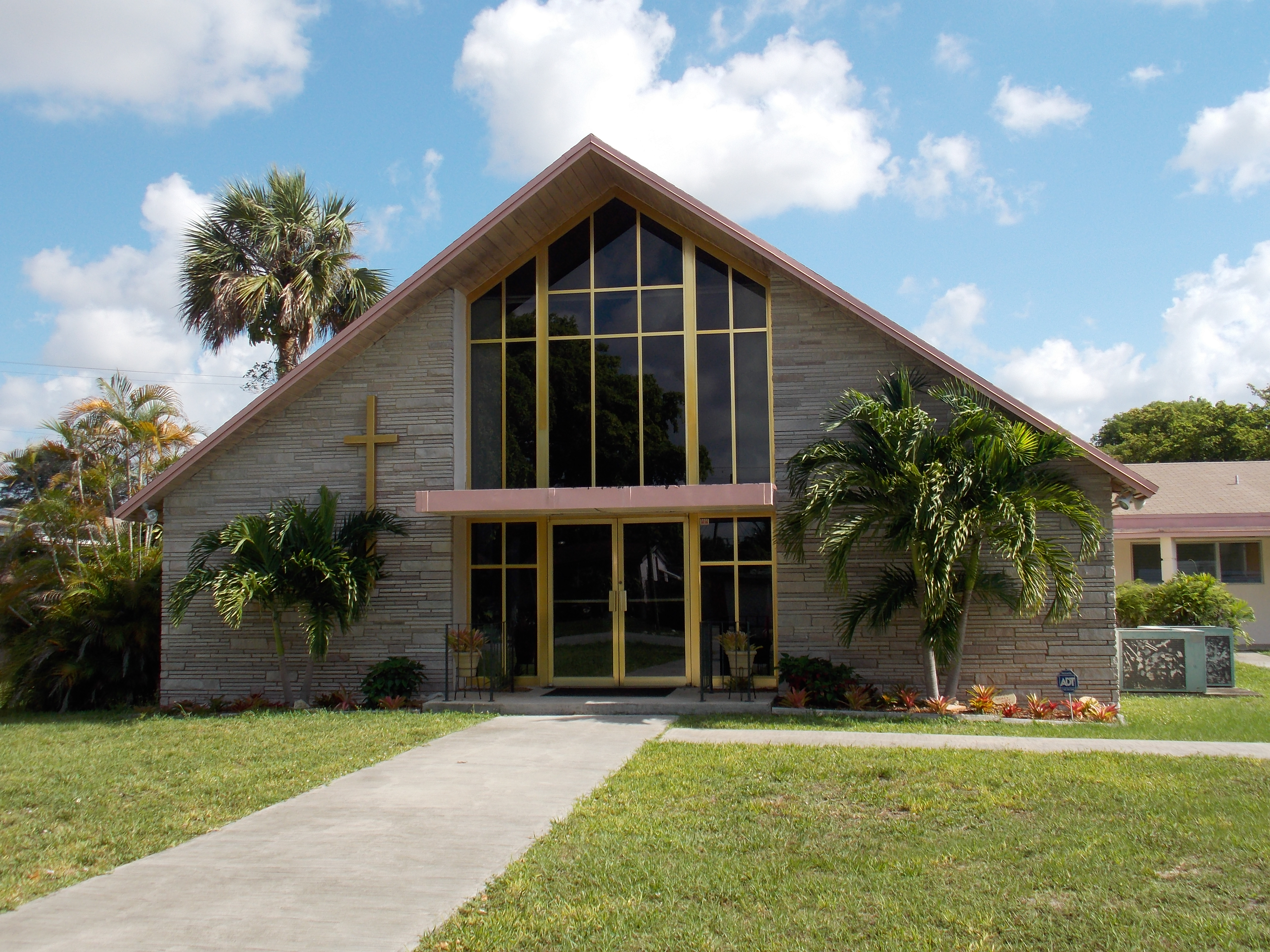
Cathedral Church of the Resurrection in Miramar, Florida

Worship in the ICCEC is formulated off the principles of the Convergence Movement. Clergy dress in traditional clerical attire and vestments (alb, stole, etc.) in liturgical worship. The principal worship service of the week is the Holy Eucharist. Many parishes follow the liturgy of the Book of Common Prayer. A sacramentary drafted by the Worship & Music Committee of the Northeast [U.S.] Diocese, which includes Roman, Anglican and Eastern rites, is also used.
