= Habel of Kaipetta =

Indian saint (1816-1899)

Saint Habel of Kaipetta
- Born: 5 May 1816; Kaipetta Village, India
- Baptised: 6 September 1854
- Died: 18 August 1899; India
- Venerated in: Anglican Church of India
- Canonized: 6 September 2003, Tiruvalla, India by Archbishop Stephen Vattappara
- Major shrine: St. Habel Church, Kallooppara, India
- Feast: 6 September

St. Habel of Kaipetta (5 May 1816 – 18 August 1899) was a convert from Hinduism to Christianity, the first convert from the Chera Dynasty of Kerala.

Habel was born "Deivathan", in Kaipatta Village, near Tiruvalla. He was baptized at the age of thirty-eight in Mallappally Anglican Church, and was christened "Habel". He learned theology from Europeans and traveled far and wide establishing congregations and churches and spreading the Gospel of Christ to thousands of people who took Baptisms and joined the Church. People revered him as a Saint.

Habel died at the age of 84 on 18 August 1899. Bishop Edward Noel Hodges attended his funeral. On 6 September 2003, Archbishop Stephen Vattappara of the Anglican Church of India declared him as a Saint. A church in the Village of Kaipatta is named after him.
