= Robert E. Webber Institute for Worship Studies =

Multi-denominational graduate theological school in Jacksonville, Florida

Coordinates: 30.2805°N 81.6499°W

The Robert E. Webber Institute for Worship Studies
- Former name: The Institute for Worship Studies
- Motto: Forming servant leaders in Christian worship renewal
- Type: Private Graduate Theological School
- Established: 1999
- Chairman: Eric Bolger
- President: Constance Cherry
- Dean: Dinelle Frankland
- Students: Approx. 180 F.T.E.
- Location: Jacksonville, Florida, United States
- Campus: Distributed
- Colors: crimson and gold
- Website: http://www.iws.edu/

The Robert E. Webber Institute for Worship Studies (IWS) was a multi-denominational graduate theological school (emphasizing worship theology) which employs a hybrid course delivery system combining intensive on-campus pedagogy and distance learning methods. The administrative offices, library, and classroom space for the on-campus intensives are provided by a church in Jacksonville, Florida.

== History ==
IWS was conceived of in the 1990s by worship theologian Robert E. Webber, who intended to provide doctoral-level theological training to Worship Leaders and Music Ministers, who often complete master's degrees in areas like music or theology, and thus lack the divinity credentials to enroll in Doctor of Ministry programs. The first student cohort began matriculating at what was then called simply "The Institute for Worship Studies" in June 1999 with a class of twenty Doctor of Worship Studies (D.W.S.) students. The Masters of Worship Studies (M.W.S.) program began in 2002. After Dr. Webber died in 2007, the board of trustees voted to rename the school in his honor, and it has been called "The Robert E. Webber Institute for Worship Studies" ever since. IWS has been cited in the "Best of the Best" issues of Worship Leader Magazine in the area of Worship Education and Training multiple times. Due to ongoing growth, the school relocated to the campus of Hendricks Avenue Baptist Church, in Jacksonville, FL. June 2026 graduation will be the final graduation for the school which has ceased operations.

== Academics ==
Academic offerings included a Master of Worship Studies (M.W.S.), which consisted of four core courses, three online courses, and the ministry internship, for a total of 36 credits. A Doctor of Worship Studies (D.W.S.) was also offered, consisting of four core courses, the Practicum, one online course, and the thesis course, for a total of 36 credits.

Notable members of the board of trustees included Laura Story Elvington and Don Moen.

== Accreditation ==
The Robert E. Webber Institute for Worship Studies was granted accredited status by the Commission on Accreditation (COA) of the Association for Biblical Higher Education in 2010, having become a member of the same in 2005. Accredited status was reaffirmed by the ABHE COA in February 2015. IWS became an Associate Member of the Association of Theological Schools in June 2018, and achieved initial accreditation with the Commission for Accrediting of the Association of Theological Schools in 2020. In 2023, IWS withdrew from ABHE.

== Faculty ==
The IWS Faculty consists entirely of adjuncts who almost all teach (or have taught) full-time at other schools. Faculty members have held positions at such schools as Wheaton College in Illinois, Lincoln Christian Seminary, Northwestern College, College of the Ozarks, Cornerstone University, Indiana Wesleyan University, Messiah College, Reformed Theological Seminary, Alliance University, Walla Walla University, and Furman University.
