= Anglican Schism =

The term Anglican Schism may refer to:

- English Reformation, the 16th century separation of the Church of England from the Roman Catholic Church
- Anglican realignment, the 21st century split within the Anglican Communion
