= Confessing Anglican Church =

Christian denomination established in 2019

- Seal
- Abbreviation: CAC
- Classification: Western Christian
- Orientation: Convergence
- Polity: Episcopal
- Bishop Primus: G. Vijay Raju
- Region: International
- Origin: 2019
- Separated from: Communion of Evangelical Episcopal Churches
- Other name: Continuing Evangelical Episcopal Communion
- Official website: ceec.church

The Confessing Anglican Church (CAC) is a Christian denomination in the Convergence Movement. Established in 2019 and originally known as the Continuing Evangelical Episcopal Communion, the denomination separated from the Communion of Evangelical Episcopal Churches. The church is led by Bishop Primus Vijay Raju of the province of India.

== History ==
In October 2019, the Communion of Evangelical Episcopal Churches adopted new regulations titled Instruments of Unity. In November 2019, the province of India within the communion began operating as the "Continuing Evangelical Episcopal Communion", adhering to the Communion of Evangelical Episcopal Churches' previous canons.

In October 2021, the CEEC formed the Anglican Bishops Council of India (ABCI) with the Anglican Church of India.

In February 2023, the Continuing Evangelical Episcopal Communion condemned the Church of England's general synod and the Archbishop of Canterbury regarding same-sex blessings.

In August 2025, the Continuing Evangelical Episcopal Communion reconstituted itself as the "Confessing Anglican Church". A faction continued to use the name "CEEC-India" and withdrew from the global CEEC taking its place in the ABCI.

As of 2026, Thomas Schirrmacher became a bishop within the Confessing Anglican Church.

== Doctrine ==
The Confessing Anglican Church adheres to the Apostles, Nicene, and Athanasian creeds as its statement of faith. It also subscribes to the Jerusalem Declaration of the Global Fellowship of Confessing Anglicans and Global Anglican Future Conference.
