= Anglican Diocese of Kibondo =

The Anglican Diocese of Kibondo is a diocese within the Anglican Church of Tanzania. Initially led by the Right Reverend Sospeter Temeo Ndenza, DD as its first diocesan bishop, the diocese's administration was succeeded in 2025 by Bishop Daudi Jonathan Ndahana.

== History ==
The Anglican Diocese of Kibondo was established on 29 April 2012, and Sospeter Tomeo Ndenza was the first bishop for the diocese. During the initial years of the Anglican Diocese of Kibondo, Ndenza and the diocese partnered with the Anglican Mission in America.

In 2015, the diocese began construction of a local health center; and by September 2016, the diocese had grown to include 38 parishes and 89 congregations. The Anglican Diocese of Kibondo also operated an Anglican training center for evangelists, Sunday school teachers, local missionaries, and women's leadership training.

Under Ndzenza's episcopal administration, the Anglican Diocese of Kibondo formalized intercommunion between Missio Mosaic (a province of the Evangelical Episcopal Communion) under then-Bishop Page Brooks, and the Apostolic Communion of Churches under Archbishop Thomas Henry Jr.—two Convergence Movement denominations.

After Ndenza's tenure, the Anglican Diocese of Kibondo's administration was succeeded by Bishop Daudi Jonathan Ndahana, who has served since 2025.
