= Communion of Evangelical Episcopal Churches =

Christian denomination (1995-)

- Seal of the CEEC
- Abbreviation: CEEC
- Classification: Western Christian
- Orientation: Convergence
- Polity: Episcopal
- Presiding Bishop: Quintin Moore
- Region: International
- Headquarters: Hutchinson, Kansas
- Origin: 1995
- Merger of: Evangelical Episcopal Churches International (1999); Christian Communion International (2012)
- Separations: Continuing Evangelical Episcopal Communion (2019); Union of Charismatic Orthodox Churches (2019); Evangelical Episcopal Communion (2021)
- Congregations: 157+
- Official website: ceec.org

The Communion of Evangelical Episcopal Churches (CEEC) is a Christian convergence communion established in 1995 within the United States of America. With a large international presence in five provinces and seven U.S. dioceses, most of its churches and missions are spread throughout the Mid-Atlantic and Mid-West regions, and South Carolina; Florida and California; and India. The Communion of Evangelical Episcopal Churches is currently led by Bishop Quintin Moore as presiding bishop of the CEEC.

== History ==
In early 1994 members of a charismatic renewal parish in the Episcopal Church USA, together with their rector, began to conceptualize a vision of a new communion of churches that would be tied to the historic Anglican spiritual tradition, while experiencing "convergence" of the streams of the Christian Church. Archbishop John Kivuva was connected with and agreed to serve as transitional presiding bishop for the new body, tentatively called the Evangelical Episcopal Church. Bishop Kivuva at that time was a bishop with the Africa Inland Mission movement and had oversight over a number of churches in Kenya.

In October 1995 in Dale City, Virginia, approximately 300 people gathered, representing a wide variety of denominational backgrounds and 25 independent congregations who had come into relationship with the new group. Bishop Michael Owen, Archdeacon Beth Owen, the Right Rev. Peter Riola, and other bishops in apostolic succession from independent Eastern Orthodox and Old Catholic jurisdictions were present to help in the consecrating of their first two bishops and the ordination of 25 pastors and 7 deacons. Among the jurisdictions present, notable groups were the International Free Catholic Communion, a continuation of the American Orthodox Catholic Church, and others stemming from the Brazilian Catholic Apostolic Church. The first two bishops consecrated included Vincent McCall (who later seceded from the EEC) and Russell McClanahan, former archbishop of the CEEC Province of St. Peter, and patriarch of the Evangelical Episcopal Communion. Initially, five congregations fully affiliated with the new communion.

In January 1997, the 6 bishops meeting in synod voted to reconstitute and reincorporate the Evangelical Episcopal Church as "The Communion of Evangelical Episcopal Churches" to reflect the international growth and the needs for eventual provincial structuring. Six countries were now represented in affiliation.

In 1997 the Rev. Duraisingh James, a priest and church planter with the Church of South India for 17 years at that time and long-time head of Christian Education for the Church Union of South India, traveled to meet with the USA founding House of Bishops and indicated his desire to affiliate with the CEEC, together with the 30 churches under his oversight. Shortly thereafter, Fr. Duraisingh was consecrated as missionary bishop for India, and later as archbishop for the CEEC Province of India. Since 1999, two new bishops have been consecrated/received into the Province of India with three dioceses numbering over 75 congregations, along with a seminary founded by Archbishop James.

In 2005, the CEEC USA province joined with the International Communion of Christian Churches to form the Communion of Convergence Churches, USA. In 2006 this relationship was strengthened as the international CEEC organization entered into "co-communion" with the CCCUSA, now known as Christian Communion International. By March 2012, Christian Communion International merged into the CEEC USA's province.

Up to 2014, the CEEC held ecumenical dialogue with Pope Francis and the Catholic Church, until Bishop Tony Palmer's death.

In 2019, a portion of the CEEC voted to continue operating under the canons that had been ratified in 2016. The Communion of Evangelical Episcopal Churches adopted Instruments of Unity between bishops and affirms that "that each jurisdiction that has a seat in the IHOB is a separate, corporate, and legal entity and maintains their own canons, which cannot be imposed on others." The Continuing Evangelical Episcopal Communion uses the same acronym and naming conventions, with the Continuing Communion's Province of Reconciliation sharing a similar name as the Diocese of the Restoration. Bishop Emilio Alvarez was also either separated with the CEEC by deposition or resignation, and helped organize the Union of Charismatic Orthodox Churches in 2019.

In 2023, the Diocese of Redemption was established in Florida.

== Statistics ==
As of 2023, the CEEC was organized into six autocephalous provinces, and seven dioceses in the U.S. Through its U.S. dioceses parish and ministry directories, as of 2023, it has 30 churches. Altogether, the CEEC claimed an estimated 157+ churches including its Order of St. Leonard in the United Kingdom; the Charismatic Churches of India; and Province of Canada. A year later, it only maintained five provinces.
