= Chinese Cereals and Oils Association =

Chinese academic organization

- Formation: 1985; 41 years ago
- Type: People's organization
- Location: China
- Parent organization: China Association for Science and Technology

The Chinese Cereals and Oils Association (CCOA, Chinese: 中国粮油学会) is an academic organization of grain and oil scientists in the People's Republic of China, functioning as a people's organization under the auspices of the China Association for Science and Technology (CAST), previously referred to as the Chinese Grain and Oils Association (Chinese: 中国粮食油脂学会).

== History ==
In 1985, the Chinese Cereals and Oils Association was founded as a national first-level organization under the auspices of the China Association for Science and Technology (CAST), with the backing of the National Food and Strategic Reserves Administration. The 2nd congress of the CCOA occurred in Weihai City, Shandong Province, China, from April 16 to 19, 1991. The 9th general meeting of the CCOA was held in October 2023 in Beijing.

The Chinese cereal and oil and baking industry produces more than 34% of the total production value of the whole food industry. Cereal, oil and feed is one of the most important sectors in the Chinese food industry.
