= Anglican Church of India =

Church in India

- Classification: Continuing Anglican
- Orientation: Protestant,Anglican
- Polity: Episcopal
- Moderator: Stephen Vattappara
- Distinct fellowships: Anglican Church of Virginia, Anglican Church International Communion
- Associations: International Council of Christian Churches (ICCC), Council of Christian Churches of India (CCCI)
- Region: India and the United States
- Origin: 24 August 1964; Kerala
- Separated from: Churches separated from Church of south india CSI and Church of north india CNI
- Congregations: 800
- Members: 500,000
- Ministers: 150
- Missionaries: 5
- Official website: www.anglicansabha.in

The Anglican Church of India (ACI) is a union of independent Anglican churches in India. It is not currently a member of the worldwide Anglican Communion.

In 1947, the Church of South India (CSI) was formed in newly independent India as a united church of Anglicans, Baptists, Basel Mission, Lutherans and Presbyterians. The Church of South India accepted an order of uniformity in worship and practice which was at odds with some aspects of Anglican tradition. Traditional Anglicans in the CSI did not accept this and there was a provision for separation within a period of 30 years from the CSI. Therefore, in 1964, some Anglicans decided to withdraw from the CSI and re-established the Anglican Church of India on 24 August 1964. Another reason was the struggle between Dalit Christians and the more dominant Saint Thomas Anglicans.

V. J. Stephen was consecrated as a bishop by Anglican bishops from the United States and Africa and also by an "Anglicanised" Evangelical bishop from Kerala, India, on 5 May 1966.

Even though the church was re-established in 1964, the synod of the Anglican Church of India was only formed in 1990 at Kottayam. The synod consists of all the diocesan bishops, clergy secretaries, lay leaders of the dioceses and church-related organisations and representatives of each diocese and independent churches. Independent churches function where there are not enough congregations to form a diocese and are also given representation in the synod. Archbishop Stephen Vattappara serves as the chairman of the synod and also as the Metropolitan of the Anglican Church of India.

In 2021, the ACI formed the "Anglican Bishops Council of India" with the Continuing Evangelical Episcopal Communion which sees itself as part of Global Fellowship of Confessing Anglicans.

== Faith ==
The foundation of the ACI's faith is contained in what is known as the Lambeth Quadrilateral accepted by the Church of England in 1888 which states:

1. Accepting the Holy Bible as the ultimate source of divine truth
2. Acceptance of the Apostles and Nicene Creeds
3. Acceptance of the only two sacraments ordained by Jesus Christ, Holy Baptism and Holy Eucharist
4. Acceptance of the historic episcopal succession

== Biblical beliefs ==
Among other equally important biblical beliefs, ACI accepts:

- the divine inspiration of the scriptures
- the Holy Trinity
- the virginity of Mary, Mother of Jesus
- the redemption of sinners through Christ
- the resurrection of Christ and
- the everlasting bliss of the saved

The head of the Anglican Church of India [Church of England in India] was the Bishop of Calcutta. His title was metropolitan. In 1947 this ceased to exist as the mainstream of Anglican Churches joined the Church Unions of South and North India [the present CSI and CNI]. They call their heads moderators. But when the ACI formed its synod in 1990 it decided to bring back the title of metropolitan.

== Metropolitan ==
Bp. Stephen Vattappara began his public life as a college students' union chairman in Kottayam. He served as a telecommunication engineer in Bombay and Northern India. He resigned his job and entered the ordained ministry in 1971. He was consecrated as bishop of the Diocese of Travancore and Cochin in 1982 and became the adjutor bishop in 1987. He was selected as the first metropolitan of the Anglican Church of India in 1990 and serves also as a vice president of the International Council of Christian Churches (ICCC). In Christianity banned Libya, while visiting his wife in 1987, Vattappara formed the Interdenominational Christian Fellowship which still remains as the only Christian movement in that country. Vattappara served as the editor of Malayalam Christian publications such as Griha Deepam and Christian Beacon. He has written and published several books, including He that guides in to All Truth, Gathereth not with Jesus, Scattereth, The End is not at once, Lo Here or There, My Kingdom is not of this World, The Anglican Church History, Baptist – A type of Antichrist? and A Complete Study on Baptism.

=== Dioceses ===
The Anglican Church of India consists of different dioceses, independent churches and other organizations. The Diocese of Travancore and Cochin is now elevated to the status of an archdiocese. The ACI currently has 15 dioceses and several independent churches as members of the synod. Out of the 15 dioceses, five are under the jurisdiction of the Archdiocese of Travancore and Cochin. The ACI is growing rapidly and is influencing many believers to come and join their fellow Anglican believers.They claim the anglican church of india community spread to 16 indian states.But Their official website https://www.anglicansabha.in/says they are spread to 16 states and they have 20 Diocese

Name	Headquarters	Admin Region	Bishop	Location
Central Diocese	Kottayam	Archdiocese of Travancore & Cochin	Archbishop Stephen Vattappara	Kerala
Kottayam Diocese	Kottayam	Archdiocese of Travancore & Cochin	Archbishop. Levi Joseph Ikera	Kerala
Malankara Diocese	Chelakompu	Archdiocese of Travancore & Cochin	Archbishop. John. J. Kochuparampil	Kerala
Maramon Diocese	Thiruvalla	Archdiocese of Travancore & Cochin	Bp. Mosses Pullolikkal	Kerala
High Range Diocese	Idukki	Archdiocese of Travancore & Cochin	Bp. John Chettiyathara	Kerala
South Kerala Diocese	Enathu	Archdiocese of Travancore & Cochin	Bp. Lukose Vallieathil	Kerala
Anglican Church of Philadelphia	Philadelphia	Archdiocese of Travancore & Cochin	Bp. Stephen J Vattappara	USA
Haryana Diocese	Gurgaon	North India	Bp. D. E. Singh	Haryana
Delhi Diocese	New Delhi	North India	Bp. Cyril S Porter	New Delhi
Chandigarh Diocese	Chandigarh	North India	Bp. Javed Massey	Chandigarh
Dehradun Diocese	Dehradun	North India	See Vacant	Uttarakhand
Jammu & Kashmir Diocese	Jammu	North India	Bp. Pankaj John	Jammu & Kashmir
Secunderabad Diocese	Secunderabad	South India	Bp. T.Raj Kishore	Telangana
Tamil Nadu & Pondicherry Diocese	Chennai	South India	Bp.Gladstone	Tamil Nadu
