= Sterling Lands II =

African American religious figure

The Most Reverend Sterling Lands, II
- Presiding Bishop of Family Life International Fellowship
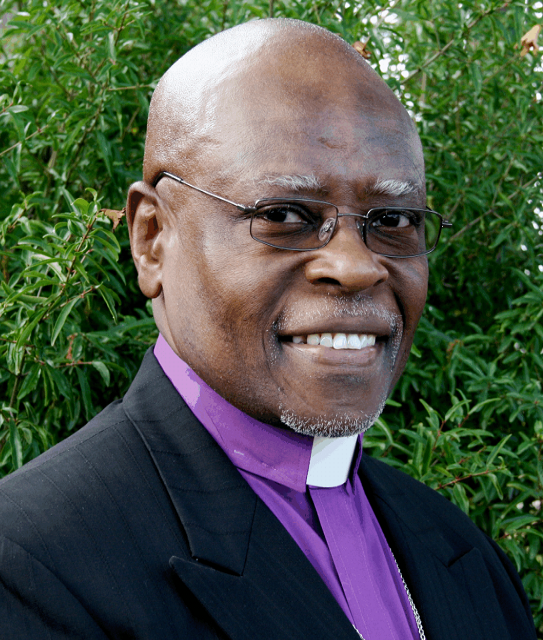
- Church: Family Life International Fellowship
- See: Greater Calvary Bible Church

Orders
- Consecration: by Russell McClanahan

Personal details
- Born: Sterling Lands, II; November 11, 1944 Baton Rouge, Louisiana, U.S.
- Residence: Austin, Texas, U.S.
- Children: 2
- Occupation: Pastor, author, community activist, entrepreneur

Sterling Lands II (born November 11, 1944) is an African-American minister and senior pastor of Greater Calvary Bible Church, formerly Greater Calvary Missionary Baptist Church. Lands is also the founder and first presiding bishop for Family Life International Fellowship, a civil rights and community activist, and author.

== Biography ==
Lands was born in Baton Rouge, Louisiana. He is a graduate of the Southern University School of Engineering, with a bachelor's degree in electrical engineering.

Moving and living in University City, Missouri, Lands was president of the St. Louis chapter of the Center for Non-violent Social Change. He was coordinator and president of the Association for the Nonviolent Social Change in America (ANSCA) from 1980-1984.

Lands pastored the Second Baptist Church, Frankford, Missouri, which merged with the 117-year-old Maryland Street Baptist Church, Louisiana, Missouri in 1981-1984. Lands founded the Greater Calvary Missionary Baptist Church, Austin, Texas September 1984, and the Family Life Bible Church in Desoto, Texas in December 2005.

Lands moved to Austin, Texas in the fall of 1984. Lands continued his movement for justice, quality education and equity for African-Americans. Lands founded the Eastside Social Action Coalition in 2000. The coalition was listed in the Progressive and Activist Organization in Austin, Texas.

In a historic ruling, Lands and his church was awarded temporary parenting responsibilities for two children.

Lands served as chair of the Community Action Task Force, a subcommittee of the Baptist Ministers' Union 2000-2006. Lands led non-violent marches in protests of racial discrimination and for equal rights and equitable protection to African-Americans residing in Austin, Texas.

Lands, a former member of the citizens panel for the police monitor's office accused the Austin Police Department of racial discrimination and shootings by the department of unarmed people of color criminal. Lands coordinated a forum for community leaders and the Austin Police Chief Art Acevedo to discuss race relations.

In 2022, Lands as a bishop within the Evangelical Episcopal Communion joined the Apostolic Communion of Anglican Churches (a Christian denomination in the Convergence Movement) through one of its provinces; while in the Apostolic Communion of Anglican Churches, they continued affiliation with the Evangelical Episcopal Communion.

== Youth advocacy ==
Lands is the founder of Greater Calvary Rites of Passage, a 501c3 non-profit organization that aims to improve the transition of black youth to adulthood through character education and development. Youth remain in the program for thirteen years. Notable graduates include jazz artist Dana Clark, and gospel songwriter, Monae Miller.

== Music ==
Lands is a "protege" of Mississippi Musicians Hall of Fame inductee Reverend Cleophus Robinson. Lands is the founder and lead musician of the Warrior Gospel Band.

== Community development ==
Lands is the founder and CEO of Rites of Passage Development, a company that specializes in affordable housing.

== Sources ==
- Lowes, Robert. "Largely white U. City PTO re-elects black president". Globe-Democrat.
- (April 1, 1981). "Special School District Candidates", St. Louis Star.
- (April 2, 1981). "District 6". St Louis Globe-Democrat.
- (April 5, 1991). "21 Candidates for 4 Seats in Special District". St. Louis Post-Dispatch.
- (August 25, 1983) "King's Dream Lives on, Son Says". Globe-Democrat.
- Vogel-Franzi, Jeane. (June 15, 1983). "U City Parents Threaten To Shut Down Schools". Clayton Citizen Journal.
- (September 22, 1983). "Lands Recognized at Testimonial Dinner". The St. Louis Sentinel.
- Rivers, Reggie. "Minister's talk to kick of King Week Activities". Austin American Statesman.
- Dayna, Finet. (July 1999). "By The Content of their Character-Sterling Lands (Gospel of Faith and Justice). The Good Life Magazine.
- Lindell, Chuck (February 5, 1995). "Man of His Word". Austin American Statesman.
- Lindell, Chuck (October 26, 1992). "Rites of Passage (Church using rituals to teach youths)". Austin American Statesman.
- Lindell, Chuck. "Midnight Mission". Austin American Statesman.
