= Christianity among Hispanic and Latino Americans =

Latinos and Hispanics are predominantly Christians in the United States. Specifically, they are most often Roman Catholic. According to a Public Religion Research Institute study in 2017, the majority of Hispanic and Latino Americans are Christians (76%), and about 11% of Americans identify as Hispanic or Latino Christian.

== Roman Catholicism ==
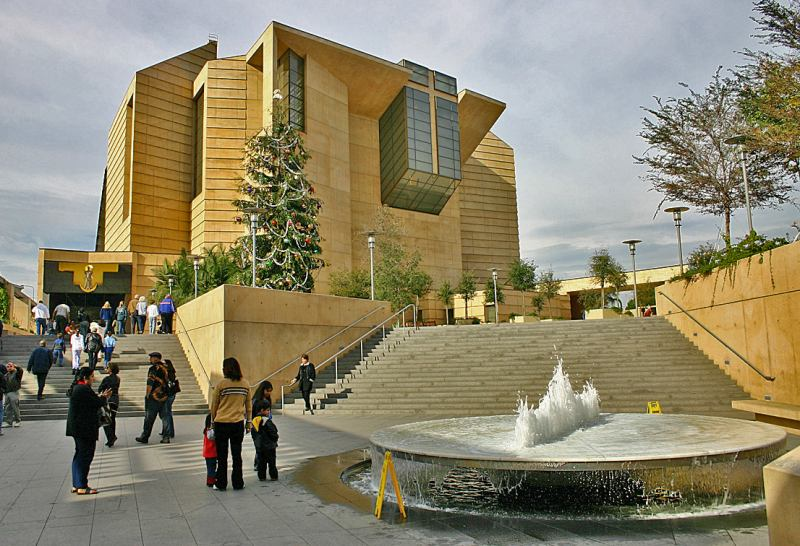
Cathedral of Our Lady of the Angels in Los Angeles

The Spanish and Portuguese took the Roman Catholic faith to Latin America, and Roman Catholicism continues to be the largest, but not the only, religious denomination among most Latinos in the United States. Among the largest Latino groups, 61% of Mexican Americans identify as Catholic, followed by Dominican American (59%), Cuban American (49%), Puerto Rican American (45%), and Salvadoran American (42%).

Among the Latino Catholics, most communities celebrate their homeland's patron saint, dedicating a day for this purpose with festivals and religious services. Some Latinos syncretize Roman Catholicism and African or Native American rituals and beliefs despite the Catholic Church's teachings against such syncretic combinations of Catholicism and paganism.

Such is the case of Santería, popular with Cuban Americans and Puerto Ricans and which combines old African beliefs in the form of Roman Catholic saints and ritual.

Catholicism is the largest religious group within Latino communities in the United States as of 2022, but that proportion has been gradually declining. While 67% of Latino adults identified as Catholic in 2010, that figure declined to 43% of Latino adults in 2022, coinciding with an increasing number of younger Latino adults who are religiously unaffiliated.

== Other Christian denominations ==
A significant number of Latinos are Protestant, representing the second-largest faith tradition among Latino communities in the United States. As of 2022, about 21% Hispanic adults identify as Protestant, a proportion that has remained relatively stable since 2010. Several Protestant denominations (particularly Evangelical ones) have vigorously proselytized in Latino communities. Among the largest Latino groups, 37% of Salvadoran American identify as Protestant, followed by Puerto Rican American (30%), Dominican American (22%), Mexican Americans (18%), and Cuban American (16%). And about 32% of Hispanic American Protestants are under the age of 30, and the median ages of Hispanic American Protestants is 37 years.

Among Latino Protestant communities, most are evangelical, but some belong to mainline denominations. Compared to Catholic, unaffiliated, and mainline Protestant Latinos, Evangelical Protestant Latinos are substantially more likely to attend services weekly, pray daily, and adhere to biblical literalism.

== Trends ==
As of 2014, the majority of Hispanic Americans are Christians (80%), while 24% of Hispanic adults in the United States are former Catholics. 55%, or about 19.6 million Latinos, of the United States Hispanic population identify as Catholic. 22% are Protestant, 16% being Evangelical Protestants, and the last major category places 18% as unaffiliated, which means they have no particular religion or identify as atheist or agnostic.

== See also ==
- Christianity
- Christianity by country
- Catholic Church by country
- Religion in Latin America
- Religion in Mexico
- Religion in Brazil
- Religion in Chile
- Religion in Cuba
- Religion in Puerto Rico
- Religion in Colombia
- Religion in Venezuela
- Religion in Argentina
