= Emilio Alvarez (bishop) =

American bishop

The Most Reverend Emilio Alvarez
- Archbishop and Primate of the Union of Charismatic Orthodox Churches
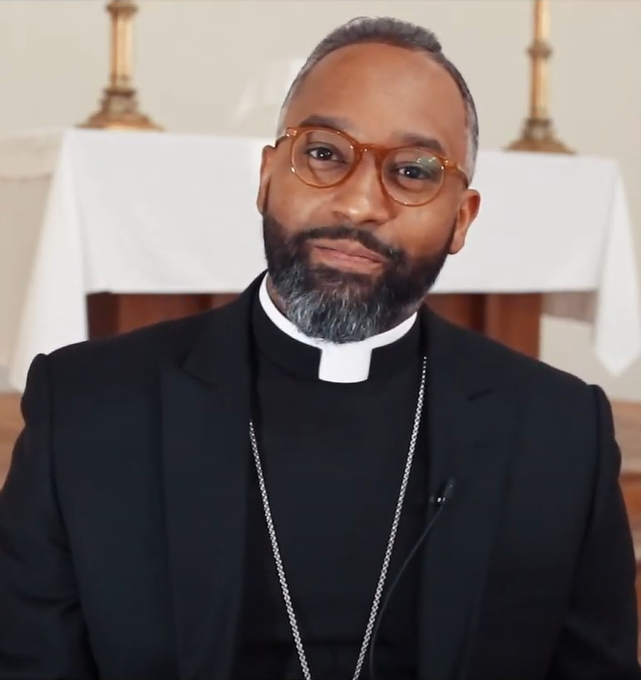
- Alvarez in 2018
- Church: Union of Charismatic Orthodox Churches

Orders
- Consecration: 2011

Personal details
- Born: Emilio Alvarez Jr. January 16
- Occupation: Pastor, author, professor
- Education: New York Theological Seminary; Fordham University; Aberdeen University

Emilio Alvarez (born January 16) is a religious leader in the United States, and founding bishop of the Union of Charismatic Orthodox Churches. He is also the founding director of the Institute for Paleo-Orthodox Christian Studies (formerly the certificate in Convergence Studies Program at New York Theological Seminary).

== Biography ==
Emilio Alvarez—born Emilio Alvarez Jr.—was reared in a Holiness-Pentecostal household, within the Church of God (Cleveland, Tennessee); he is the son of a bishop within the denomination. As a minister within the Church of God (Cleveland, Tennessee), Alvarez transitioned into the Convergence Movement after questioning his childhood denomination's anti-Catholicism.

In 2011, Alvarez was consecrated to the episcopacy as a bishop for the Communion of Evangelical Episcopal Churches. He was invited to attend an audience with Pope Francis in 2014; Alvarez served as official translator for the meeting, themed, "The Miracle of Unity".

In July 2019, Alvarez helped establish the Union of Charismatic Orthodox Churches within Painted Post, New York. He was unanimously elected as its interim presiding prelate, before being appointed primate. During his prelature in December 2020, he was hosted by Archbishop Elpidophoros of the Greek Orthodox Archdiocese of America.

In 2021, he was installed as archbishop and primate for the Union of Charismatic Orthodox Churches.

In 2022, Alvarez published Pentecostal Orthodoxy: Toward an Ecumenism of the Spirit through InterVarsity Press. He became an associate provost at Asbury Theological Seminary, relocating from Rochester, New York where he pastored The Cathedral at The Gathering Place.

In 2025, Alvarez was announced as the new Vice President for Academic Affairs and Dean of Colgate Rochester Crozer Divinity School, leaving his role at Asbury Theological Seminary.

== Selected works ==
- Pentecostal Orthodoxy: Toward an Ecumenism of the Spirit, 2022 (ISBN 978-1-5140-0090-8, 978-1-5140-0091-5)
- Pentecost: A Day of Power for All People, 2023 (ISBN 978-1-5140-0054-0)

== See also ==
- Convergence Movement
- Paleo-orthodoxy
