= Randy Adler =

- Patriarch of the Charismatic Episcopal Church, Primate of the United States Province of the Charismatic Episcopal Church, and Archbishop of San Clemente
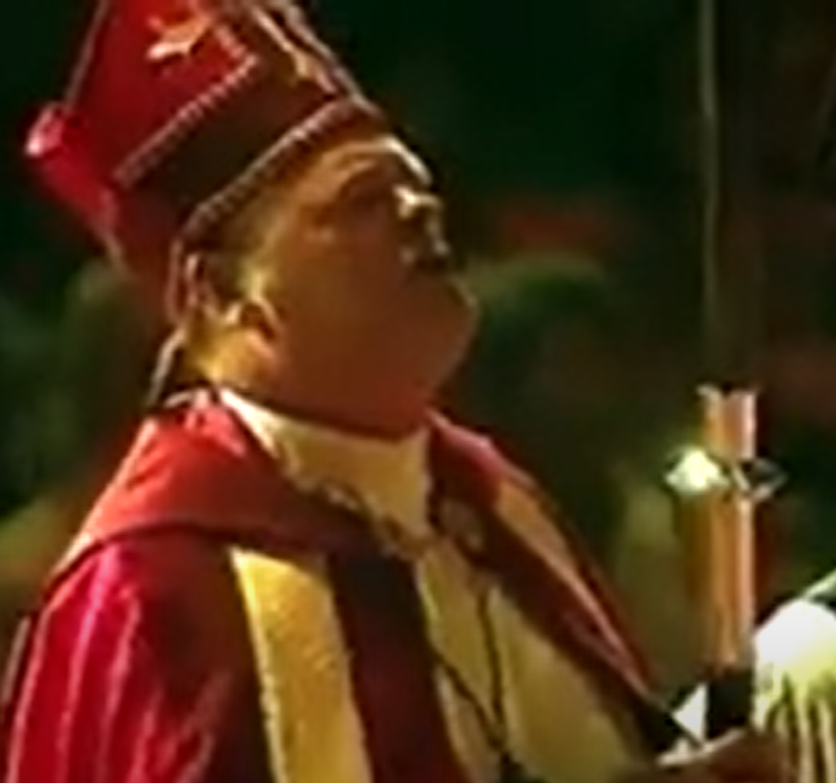
- Church: Charismatic Episcopal Church
- Retired: October 2007

Orders
- Consecration: 1992 by Herman Adrian Spruit

Personal details
- Born: Austin Randolph Adler
- Died: December 9, 2016
- Occupation: Pastor

Austin Randolph (Papu) Adler was a bishop, primate, and patriarch of the International Communion of the Charismatic Episcopal Church (also known as the Charismatic Episcopal Church). He was consecrated on 26 June 1992, with Timothy Michael Barker of the International Free Catholic Communion—who was consecrated by Archbishop-Patriarch Herman Adrian Spruit of the Catholic Apostolic Church of Antioch, functioning as the principal consecrator. Adler served as the patriarch of the Charismatic Episcopal Church, primate of the United States Province, and Archbishop of San Clemente. He retired in October 2007 and died on December 9, 2016.
