= Thomas C. Oden =

American Methodist theologian (1931–2016)

The Reverend Thomas C. Oden
- Born: Thomas Clark Oden; October 21, 1931; Altus, Oklahoma, US
- Died: December 8, 2016 (aged 85)
- Spouse: Edrita Pokorny (m. 1952)

Ecclesiastical career
- Religion: Christianity (Methodist)
- Church: United Methodist Church

Academic background
- Education: University of Oklahoma; Southern Methodist University; Yale University
- Doctoral advisor: H. Richard Niebuhr
- Influences: Will Herberg

Academic work
- Discipline: Theology
- School or tradition: Paleo-orthodoxy
- Institutions: Phillips University; Drew University
- Notable works: John Wesley's Teachings (2012–2014)

Thomas Clark Oden (1931–2016) was an American Methodist theologian and religious author. He is often regarded as the father of the paleo-orthodox theological movement and is considered to be one of the most influential theologians of the 20th century and the beginning of the 21st century. He was Henry Anson Buttz Professor of Theology and Ethics at Drew University in New Jersey from 1980 until his retirement in 2004.

== Life ==
Oden was born on October 21, 1931, in Altus, Oklahoma, the son of an attorney and music teacher. As a youth, he considered two vocations: lawyer or Methodist minister. At age ten, Oden's family moved to Oklahoma City. After the Second World War, Oden returned to Altus and high school where he began writing and speaking in public. Oden earned a BA degree from the University of Oklahoma (1953), a BD from Southern Methodist University (1956), and his MA (1958) and PhD from Yale University (1960). He married Edrita Pokorny on August 10, 1952. They had three children: Clark, Edward, and Laura.

Oden lectured at Yale University, Southern Methodist University, Heidelberg University, Princeton Theological Seminary, Lomonosov University, and the Pontifical Gregorian University in Rome.

== Theology ==
Originally a political and theological liberal, he turned to the patristic writings in the early 1970s under the influence of a Jewish colleague, Will Herberg, and discovered what he described as "ecumenical orthodoxy," the interpretation of the New Testament and apostolic doctrine which is universal and accepted. As he wrote in the preface of his Systematic Theology: "My basic goal is to present an orderly view of the faith of the Christian community, on which there has generally been a substantial agreement between the traditions of the East and the West, including Catholicism, Protestantism and Orthodoxy."

Oden became a proponent of paleo-orthodoxy, an approach to theology that often relies on patristic sources. He published a series of books that he said are tools for promoting "classical Christianity". Oden suggested that Christians need to rely upon the wisdom of the historical Church, particularly the early Church, rather than on modern scholarship and theology, which is often, in his view, tainted by political agendas.

Oden said that his mission was "to begin to prepare the postmodern Christian community for its third millennium by returning again to the careful study and respectful following of the central tradition of classical Christianity."

Oden was active in the Confessing Movement in America, particularly within the United Methodist Church, and he served on the board of the Institute on Religion and Democracy. Dean Timothy George of the Beeson Divinity School called Oden "one of the most remarkable Christians of our time [who] has lived through, contributed to and helped overthrow several revolutions."

Oden had an Arminian theology. His book The Transforming Power of Grace presents one of the best expositions of Arminian theology according to Roger E. Olson. Here are some quotes of The Transforming Power of Grace highlighted by Olson:

“God prepares the will and co-works with the prepared will. Insofar as grace precedes and prepares free will it is called prevenient. Insofar as grace accompanies and enables human willing to work with divine willing, it is called cooperating grace.” “Only when sinners are assisted by prevenient grace can they begin to yield their hearts to cooperation with subsequent forms of grace.” “The need for grace to prevene is great, for it was precisely when ‘you were dead in your transgressions and sins’ (Eph. 2:1) that ‘by grace you have been saved’ (eph. 2:8).”

Olson notes that "By all accounts an orthodox, biblically serious, and evangelical theologian, Oden winsomely and biblically articulates the theology [...] that I call evangelical synergism [or Arminian soteriology]."

== Death ==
He died on December 8, 2016, at the age of 85. Timothy George wrote in a tribute article after his death:

Few theologians of the past 100 years can claim to have had tea and cookies with Rudolf Bultmann, discussed theology with Karl Barth at his hospital bed in Basel, had lunch with Joseph Cardinal Ratzinger, had an audience with Pope John Paul II, driven through Galilee in a Fiat with Avery Dulles in the passenger seat, and conferred with Coptic and Pentecostal theologians in Africa. Oden did all of these and much more. Along the way, he was both scorned and lionized, and he bore scars from some of the scrapes he was in.

== Works ==
Oden wrote and edited many books, articles, essays, and speeches on a wide range of topics. The following list is limited to books.

- The Crisis of the World and the Word of God, 1962.
- Radical Obedience: The Ethics of Rudolf Bultmann, 1964.
- The Community of Celebration, 1964.
- Kerygma and Counseling, 1966.
- Contemporary Theology and Psychotherapy, 1967.
- The Structure of Awareness, 1969,1978 (Standard Book #:687-40075-9).
- The Promise of Barth, 1969.
- Beyond Revolution, 1970.
- The Intensive Group Experience, 1972.
- After Therapy What?, 1974.
- Game Free: the Meaning of Intimacy, 1974.
- Should Treatment Be Terminated?, 1976.
- TAG: The Transanctional Game, 1976.
- Parables of Kierkegaard, 1978.
- Agenda for Theology, 1979, rpt as After Modernity...What?, 1992 (ISBN 0-310-75391-0).
- Guilt Free, 1980.
- Pastoral Theology: Essentials of Ministry, 1983 (ISBN 0-06-066353-7).
- Oden, Thomas C. (1984). Care of Souls in the Classic Tradition. Philadelphia: Fortress Press, cop. Archived from the original on 2005-02-17.
- Conscience and Dividends, 1985.
- Oden, Thomas C. (1987). Becoming a minister. Classical Pastoral Care. Vol. 1. New York: Crossroad Publishing Co.
- Oden, Thomas C. (1987). Ministry through Word and Sacrament. Classical Pastoral Care. Vol. 2. New York: Crossroad Publishing Co.
- Oden, Thomas C. (1987). Pastoral Counsel. Classical Pastoral Care. Vol. 3. New York: Crossroad Publishing Co.
- Oden, Thomas C. (1987). Crisis Ministries. Classical Pastoral Care. Vol. 4. New York: Crossroad Publishing Co.
- Crisis Ministries, was Vol 1 Classical Pastoral Care Series, 1986, rpt as Vol 4, 1994.
- Becoming a Minister, Vol 1 Classical Pastoral Care Series, 1986, 1994.
- The Living God, Systematic Theology, Vol 1, 1987, 1992.
- Doctrinal Standards in the Wesleyan Tradition, 1988, rev 2008 (ISBN 0-310-75240-X).
- Phoebe Palmer: Selected Writings, 1988.
- Ministry Through Word and Sacrament, Vol 4 Classical Pastoral Care Series, 1988, rpt 1994.
- The Word of Life Systematic Theology, Vol 2, 1989, rpt 1992, 1998.
- First and Second Timothy and Titus: Interpretation, 1989, rpt 2012.
- Pastoral Counsel, Vol 3 Classical Pastoral Care Series, 1989, rpt 1994.
- Life in the Spirit, Systematic Theology, Vol 3, 1992 rpt 1994,1998.
- Two Worlds: Notes on the Death of Modernity in America and Russia, 1992.
- Oden, Thomas C. (1993). The Transforming Power of Grace. Nashville, TN: Abingdon Press.
- The Transforming Power of Grace, 1993 (ISBN 0-687-42260-4).
- Oden, Thomas (1994). John Wesley's Scriptural Christianity: A Plain Exposition of His Teaching on Christian Doctrine. Grand Rapids, MI: Zondervan.
- Corrective Love: The Power of Communion Discipline, 1995 (ISBN 0-570-04803-6).
- Requiem: A Lament in Three Movements, 1995 (ISBN 0-687-01160-4).
- The Justification Reader, 2002.
- The Rebirth of Orthodoxy: Signs of New Life in Christianity, 2003 (ISBN 0-06-009785-X).
- One Faith: The Evangelical Consensus (written with J. I. Packer), 2004 (ISBN 0-8308-3239-4).
- The Humor of Kierkegaard: An Anthology, 2004.
- Turning Around the Mainline: How Renewal Movements Are Changing the Church, 2006.
- How Africa Shaped the Christian Mind, 2007, pb 2010.
- Good Works Reader, Classic Christian Reader Series, 2007.
- Classic Christianity: A Systematic Theology, 2009 (ISBN 978-0061449710).
- In Search of Solitude: Living the Classic Christian Hours of Prayer, 2010.
- The African Memory of Mark: Reassessing Early Church Tradition, 2011.
- Early Libyan Christianity, 2011.
- Oden, Thomas C. (2012). God and Providence. John Wesley's Teachings. Vol. 1. Grand Rapids, MI: Zondervan.
- Oden, Thomas C. (2012). Christ and Salvation. John Wesley's Teachings. Vol. 2. Grand Rapids, MI: Zondervan.
- Oden, Thomas C. (2013). Pastoral Theology. John Wesley's Teachings. Vol. 3. Grand Rapids, MI: Zondervan.
- Oden, Thomas C. (2014). Ethics and Society. John Wesley's Teachings. Vol. 4. Grand Rapids, MI: Zondervan.
- Oden, Thomas C. (2014). A Change of Heart: A Personal and Theological Memoir. Downers Grove, IL: InterVarsity.
- Oden, Thomas C. (2011). Ancient Christian Commentary on Scripture (PDF). Downers Grove, IL: InterVarsity. Archived from the original (PDF) on 2016-03-03., that Oden describes as a multi-volume patristic commentary on Scripture by the “fathers of the church” spanning “the era from Clement of Rome (fl. c. 95) to John of Damascus (c.645-c.749).”
- In the Wesleyan Theological Heritage, edited with help from Leicester R. Longden ISBN 978-0310754718.

== Essays in honor of Oden ==
- Ancient & Postmodern Christianity: Paleo-Orthodoxy in the 21st Century, Essays In Honor of Thomas C. Oden, Christopher Hall and Kenneth Tanner, eds, 2002 (ISBN 0-8308-2654-8)

== Notes and references ==
=== Sources ===
- Drew University (2002). "Faculty page". Drew University.
- Heise, Jennifer (2011). "Thomas Oden Publications, 1960-2000". Drew University Library.
- Oden, Thomas C. (1992). Zondervan (ed.). After Modernity...What?: Agenda for Theology. Grand Rapids, MI.
- Oden, Thomas C. (2014). A Change of Heart: A Personal and Theological Memoir. Downers Grove, IL: InterVarsity.
- Olson, Roger E. (2011). Against Calvinism. Grand Rapids, MI: Zondervan. ISBN 9780310324676.
- Olson, Roger E. (2014). Arminianism FAQ: Everything You Always Wanted to Know. [Franklin, TE]: Seedbed Publishing. ISBN 9781628241624.
- Shellnutt, Kate (2016). "Died: Thomas Oden, Methodist Theologian Who Found Classical Christianity". christianitytoday.com.
- George, Thimothy (2016). "Reversed Thunder: A Tribute to Thomas C. Oden (1931-2016)". christianitytoday.
