= Paleo-orthodoxy =

Protestant Christian theological movement

Paleo-orthodoxy (from Ancient Greek παλαιός "ancient" and Koine Greek ὀρθοδοξία "correct belief") is a Protestant Christian theological movement in the United States which emerged in the late 20th and early 21st centuries and which focuses on the consensual understanding of the faith among the ecumenical councils and Church Fathers. While it understands this consensus of the Church Fathers as orthodoxy proper, it calls itself paleo-orthodoxy to distinguish itself from neo-orthodoxy, a movement that was influential among Protestant churches in the mid-20th century.

== Background ==
Paleo-orthodoxy attempts to see the essentials of Christian theology in the consensus of the Great Church before the schism between the Eastern Orthodox Church and the Catholic Church (the East–West schism of 1054) and before the separation of Protestantism from the Roman Catholic Church (the Protestant Reformation of 1517), described in the canon of Vincent of Lérins as "Quod ubique, quod semper, quod ab omnibus" ("What [is believed] everywhere, always and by everyone"). Adherents of paleo-orthodoxy often form part of the Convergence Movement, However, paleo-orthodoxy is not exclusive to the movement. Paleo-orthodox Protestants have different interpretations of the early Church's teachings.

== Paleo-orthodox theologians ==
The dominant figure of the movement, United Methodist theologian Thomas C. Oden of Drew University, published a series of books not only calling for a return to "classical Christianity" but also providing the tools to do so. The 2002 collection of essays in honor of Oden, Ancient and Postmodern Christianity: Paleo-Orthodoxy in the 21st Century (Kenneth Tanner, Christopher Alan Hall, eds., ISBN 978-0830826544) offers a glimpse into the work of some of the theologians active in this area: Robert Jenson, Christopher Hall, Amy Oden, Bradley Nassif, David Mills, Robert Webber, Geoffrey Wainwright, Carl Braaten, Stanley Grenz, John Franke, Alan Padget, Wolfhart Pannenberg, Richard John Neuhaus, et al. Similar approaches emerge in the theology of Marva Dawn (a Lutheran); Alister McGrath (a Church of England Reformed evangelical); Andrew Purves (a Presbyterian); Timothy George (Baptist); and Christopher Hall (an Episcopalian). Other notable theologians in the movement have included J. Davila-Ashcraft (Evangelical Episcopal Communion) and Emilio Alvarez (founding archbishop of the Union of Charismatic Orthodox Churches).

== See also ==
- Restorationism
- Old Catholicism
