= Robert E. Webber =

American theologian (1933–2007)

Robert Eugene Webber (November 27, 1933 – April 27, 2007) was an American theologian known for his work on worship and the early church. He played a key role in the Convergence Movement, a movement among evangelical and charismatic churches in the United States to blend charismatic worship with liturgies from the Book of Common Prayer and other liturgical sources.

== Early life ==
The son of a Baptist minister, Webber was born in Philadelphia and raised for the first seven years of his life in the small village of Mitulu in the Belgian Congo where his parents were missionaries with the Africa Inland Mission. Chester Robert Webber and Harriett Basto Russell Webber had three children, Robert, an older sister Eleanor (Webber) Entwistle, and a younger brother, Kenneth Webber. His family returned to the United States when his brother became seriously ill and his father then became pastor of the Montgomeryville Baptist Church in Colmar, Pennsylvania.

== Education ==
He received his bachelor's degree from Bob Jones University in 1956 and went on to earn a divinity degree from the Reformed Episcopal Seminary in 1959, and a master's degree in theology from Covenant Theological Seminary in 1960. In 1968, he received his doctoral degree in theology from Concordia Seminary in Saint Louis.

== Theological influence ==
Webber began teaching theology at Wheaton College in 1968. Existentialism was the primary focus of Webber's research and lectures during his first years at Wheaton. However, he soon shifted his focus to the early church. In 1978 he wrote Common Roots, a book that examined the impact of 2nd-century Christianity on the contemporary church.

In 1985 Webber wrote Evangelicals on the Canterbury Trail: Why Evangelicals Are Attracted to the Liturgical Church, in which he described the reasons behind his own gradual shift away from his fundamentalist/evangelical background toward the Anglican tradition. Webber faced an enormous amount of criticism from evangelicals in response to this book. Nevertheless, his work was highly influential, and his ideas grew in popularity in evangelical circles. In 2012, Professor of Christian worship Lester Ruth revised and updated the book with testimonies from a new generation of evangelicals who have found their way to Anglican churches.

During the latter half of his life, Webber took a special interest in Christian worship practices. He wrote more than 40 books on the topic of worship, focusing on how the worship practices of the ancient church have value for the church in the 21st-century postmodern era. Among his books are Ancient-Future Worship, Ancient-Future Faith, Ancient-Future Time, Ancient-Future Evangelism, The Younger Evangelicals, and The Divine Embrace. Webber also served as editor of The Complete Library of Christian Worship (1995), an eight-volume series created to serve as a comprehensive reference for professors, students, pastors, and worship leaders. The series draws on several thousand texts and publications and covers topics like Old and New Testament worship and contemporary applications for music and the arts.

Webber founded The Robert E. Webber Institute for Worship Studies in Jacksonville, Florida, in 1998. The school offers Doctor of Worship Studies and Master of Worship Studies degrees. It is the only accredited graduate institution in the United States to focus exclusively on worship education. He remained president of the institute until his death.

Webber retired from Wheaton in 2000 and was named Professor Emeritus. In 2000, Webber took a position as the Myers Professor of Ministry and Director of the M.A. in Worship and Spirituality at Northern Seminary in Lombard, Illinois, which he served in until his death in 2007.

In 2006, he organized and edited the "Call to an Ancient Evangelical Future", a document intended "to restore the priority of the divinely inspired biblical story of God's acts in history".

Webber died of pancreatic cancer on April 27, 2007, at his home in Sawyer, Michigan, aged 73.

In 2012, Trinity School for Ministry, an evangelical Anglican seminary in Ambridge, Pennsylvania, established the Robert E. Webber Center for an Ancient Evangelical Future. The Center's mission is to continue Webber's vision: to recover the theological, spiritual and liturgical resources of the ancient Christian Tradition for the church today.

== Partial bibliography ==
- The Secular Saint: A Case for Evangelical Social Responsibility (1979) ISBN 978-0310366409
- Celebrating Our Faith: Worship as Outreach and Nurture (1986) ISBN 978-0060692865
- The Majestic Tapestry (1986) ISBN 978-0840755360
- Evangelicals on the Canterbury Trail: Why Evangelicals Are Attracted to the Liturgical Church (1989 reprint [1985]) ISBN 9780819214768
- Worship is a Verb (1992) ISBN 978-1565632424
- Liturgical Evangelism (1992) [Reprint of Celebrating our Faith under different publisher] ISBN 978-0819215963
- The Book of Daily Prayer (1993) ISBN 978-0802806789
- The Worship Phenomenon: A Dynamic New Awakening in Worship is Reviving the Body of Christ (1994) ISBN 978-1562332549
- Worship Old and New (1994) ISBN 978-0310479901
- The Complete Library of Christian Worship, 8 vols. (1995)
  - The Biblical Foundations for Worship, Volume 1 ISBN 978-1565631854
  - Twenty Centuries of Christian Worship, Volume 2 ISBN 978-1562330125
  - The Renewal of Sunday Worship, Volume 3 ISBN 978-1565631878
  - Music & the Arts in Worship, Book 1, Volume 4 ISBN 978-1565631892
  - Music & the Arts in Worship, Book 2, Volume 4 ISBN 978-1565631908
  - The Services of Christian Year, Volume 5 ISBN 1-56563-191-9
  - The Sacred Actions of Christian Worship, Volume 6 ISBN 978-1562330163
  - The Ministries of Christian Worship, Volume 7 ISBN 978-1565631939
- Blended Worship: Achieving Substance and Relevance in Worship (1996) ISBN 978-1565632455
- The Book of Family Prayer (1996) ISBN 978-1565632493
- Planning Blended Worship: The Creative Mixture of Old and New (1998) ISBN 978-0687032235
- Ancient-Future Faith: Rethinking Evangelicalism for a Postmodern World (1999) ISBN 0-8010-6029-X
- The Prymer: The Prayer Book of the Medieval Era Adapted for Contemporary Use (2000) ISBN 978-1557252562
- The People of the Truth with Rodney Clapp (2001) ISBN 1-57910-560-2
- Journey to Jesus: The Worship, Evangelism, and Nurture Mission of the Church (2001) ISBN 978-0687068401
- The Younger Evangelicals: Facing the Challenges of the New World (2002) ISBN 978-0801091520
- Ancient-Future Evangelism: Making Your Church a Faith-Forming Community (2003) ISBN 0-8010-9160-8
- Ancient-Future Time: Forming Spirituality through the Christian Year (2004) ISBN 0-8010-9175-6
- The Secular Saint: A Case for Evangelical Social Responsibility (REPRINT by Wipf & Stock, 2004) ISBN 978-1592446308
- The Divine Embrace: Recovering the Passionate Spiritual Life [Ancient-Future Series] (2006) ISBN 0-8010-6555-0
- Listening to the Beliefs of Emerging Churches: Five Perspectives (Editor, 2007) ISBN 978-0310271352
- Ancient-Future Worship (2008) ISBN 0-8010-6624-7
- Who Gets to Narrate the World?: Contending for the Christian Story in an Age of Rivals (2008) ISBN 978-0830834815
- Evangelicals on the Canterbury Trail: Why Evangelicals Are Attracted to the Liturgical Church (Revised with Lester Ruth, 2012) ISBN 978-0819228512
