= Catholic Apostolic Church of Antioch =

- Classification: Western Christian
- Orientation: Independent Catholicism
- Polity: Episcopal
- Presiding Bishop: Mark Newman
- Founder: Herman Adrian Spruit
- Official website: https://churchofantioch.org

The Catholic Apostolic Church of Antioch (CACA) is an Independent Catholic denomination in the United States, established in 1958 by Herman Adrian Spruit. The church claims membership throughout the U.S., Canada, Mexico, Argentina, and the United Kingdom. Since 2009, the presiding bishop of the Catholic Apostolic Church of Antioch has been the Most Rev. Mark Elliott Newman.

== History ==
The former and deceased leader of the Catholic Apostolic Church of Antioch, Herman Adrian Spruit

After exploring several theological and mystical practices, Herman Adrian Spruit established the Catholic Apostolic Church of Antioch in 1958. Being consecrated by Charles H. Hampton – a formerly Liberal Catholic priest who became an Old Catholic bishop whose holy orders descend through Hugh George de Willmott-Newman and the Catholicate of the West – Spruit's jurisdiction became religiously pluralistic.

Renting a former Roman Catholic chapel on Sundays, Spruit's Independent Catholic church has been described as theologically liberal through the ordination of women and LGBT persons to the presbyterate and episcopate. The Catholic Apostolic Church of Antioch also practices open communion.

Until her retirement in 2005, Spruit declared and consecrated his 4th wife, Meri Louise Spruit to succeed as head of the Catholic Apostolic Church of Antioch—establishing the church as a matriarchy. She was then succeeded by Richard Alston Gundrey in 2005 who ordained numerous independent sacramental bishops for several jurisdictions other than the Catholic Apostolic Church of Antioch. Mark Newman was elected as the fourth presiding bishop in 2009.

At an unknown time, the Roman Catholic Church's hierarchy condemned lay participation in this jurisdiction's sacramental activities.

== Impact ==
Through the Catholic Apostolic Church of Antioch, multiple jurisdictions have sought and acquired episcopal consecration, such as the founding bishops of the Charismatic Episcopal Church, and some founding bishops of the Communion of Evangelical Episcopal Churches although conditional consecrations extended forth through others such as a continuation of the American Orthodox Catholic Church and the Brazilian Catholic Apostolic Church for both churches.
