= List of heresies in the Catholic Church =

In its vision of heresy, the Catholic Church makes a distinction between material and formal heresy. Material heresy means in effect "holding erroneous doctrines through no fault of one's own" due to inculpable ignorance and "is neither a crime nor a sin" since the individual has made the error in good faith. Formal heresy is "the wilful and persistent adherence to an error in matters of faith" on the part of a baptised person. As such it is a grave sin and involves ipso facto excommunication; a Catholic that embraces a formal heresy is considered to have automatically separated their soul from the Catholic Church. Here "matters of faith" means dogmas which have been proposed by the infallible magisterium of the Church and, in addition to this intellectual error, "pertinacity in the will" in maintaining it in opposition to the teaching of the Church must be present.

Heresy has been a concern in Christian communities at least since the writing of the Second Epistle of Peter: "Even as there shall be false teachers among you, who privily shall bring in damnable heresies, even denying the Lord that bought them" (2 Peter 2:1). In the first two or three centuries of the early Church, heresy and schism were not clearly distinguished. A similar overlapping occurred in medieval scholasticism. Heresy is understood today to mean the denial of revealed truth as taught by the Church. Nineteenth-century theologian Friedrich Schleiermacher defined it as "that which preserved the appearance of Christianity, and yet contradicted its essence". This article contains the movements and denominations which have been declared as heresy by the Catholic Church.

The following listing contains those opinions which were either explicitly condemned by Chalcedonian Christianity before 1054 or are of later origin but similar. Details of some modern opinions deemed to be heretical by the Catholic Church are listed in an appendix. All lists are in alphabetical order.

== Early Christianity ==
Traditionally, orthodoxy and heresy have been viewed in relation to the "orthodoxy" as an authentic lineage of tradition. Other forms of Christianity were viewed as deviant streams of thought and therefore "heterodox", or heretical. This view was dominant until the publication of Walter Bauer's Rechtgläubigkeit und Ketzerei im ältesten Christentum ("Orthodoxy and heresy in ancient Christianity") in 1934. Bauer endeavoured to rethink early Christianity historically, independent from the views of the church. He argued that originally unity was based on a common relationship with the same Lord rather than on formally defined doctrines and that a wide variety of views was tolerated. With time, some of these views were seen as inadequate. He went on to attribute the definition of "orthodoxy" to the increasing power and influence of the Church of Rome. In 1959, Henry Chadwick argued that all Christian communities were linked by the foundational events which occurred in Jerusalem and continued to be of defining importance in the forging of doctrinal orthodoxy. McGrath comments that historically Chadwick's account appears to be much more plausible.

For convenience the heresies which arose in this period have been divided into three groups: Trinitarian/Christological; Gnostic; and other heresies.

=== Trinitarian/Christological heresies ===
The term Christology has two meanings in theology: it can be used in the narrow sense of the question as to how the divine and human are related in the person of Jesus Christ, or alternatively of the overall study of his life and work. Here it is used in the restricted, narrow sense.

The orthodox teaching concerning the Trinity, as finally developed and formally agreed at Constantinople in 381, is that God the Father, God the Son, and the Holy Spirit were all strictly one being in three hypostases, misleadingly translated as "persons". The Christological question then arose as to how Jesus Christ could be both divine and human. This was formally resolved after much debate by the Ecumenical Councils of 431, 451 and 680 (Ephesus, Chalcedon and Constantinople III).

Trinitarian/Christological heresies
Heresy	Description	Origin	Official condemnation	Other
Adoptionism	Belief that Jesus was born as a mere (non-divine) man, was supremely virtuous and that he was adopted later as the "Son of God" by the descent of the Spirit on him.	Propounded by Theodotus of Byzantium, a leather merchant, in Rome c.190, later revived by Paul of Samosata.	Theodotus was excommunicated by Pope Victor and Paul was condemned by the Synod of Antioch in 268.	Alternative names: Psilanthropism and Dynamic Monarchianism. Later criticized as presupposing Nestorianism (see below).
Apollinarism	Belief that Jesus had a human body and lower soul (the seat of the emotions) but a divine mind. Apollinaris further taught that the souls of men were propagated by other souls, as well as their bodies.	Proposed by Apollinaris of Laodicea (died 390).	Declared to be a heresy in 381 by the First Council of Constantinople.	
Arabici	Belief that the soul perished with the body, and that both would be revived on Judgement Day.	Founder unknown, but associated with 3rd-century Christians from Arabia.		Reconciled to the main body of the Church after a council in 250 led by Origen.
Arianism	Denial of the true divinity of Jesus Christ taking various specific forms, but all agreed that Jesus Christ was created by the Father, that he had a beginning in time, and that the title "Son of God" was a courtesy one.	The doctrine is associated with Arius (c. AD 250–336) who lived and taught in Alexandria, Egypt.	Arius was first pronounced a heretic at the First Council of Nicaea, he was later exonerated as a result of imperial pressure and finally declared a heretic after his death. The heresy was finally resolved in 381 by the First Council of Constantinople.	All forms denied that Jesus Christ is "consubstantial with the Father" but proposed either "similar in substance", "similar", or "dissimilar" as the correct alternative.
Anomoeanism	A heresy that taught that Jesus was not fully divine, but was a created being. Anomoeans also believed that Christ could not be like God because he lacked the quality of self-existence.	Aëtius of Antioch and Eunomius of Cyzicus	Condemned in 381 by the First Council of Constantinople.	
Collyridianism	Belief that the Trinity consists of the Father, Son, and Mary and that the Son is a result of the marital union between the other two.	Described by Epiphanius in his Panarion.		The existence of the sect is subject to some dispute due to the lack of historical evidence aside from the writings of Epiphanius.
Docetism	Belief that Jesus' physical body was an illusion, as was his crucifixion; that is, Jesus only seemed to have a physical body and to physically die, but in reality, he was incorporeal, a pure spirit, and hence could not physically die.	Tendencies existed in the 1st century, but it was most notably embraced by Gnostics in subsequent centuries.	Docetism was rejected by the ecumenical councils and mainstream Christianity, and largely died out during the first millennium AD.	Gnostic movements that survived past that time, such as Catharism, incorporated docetism into their beliefs, but such movements were destroyed by the Albigensian Crusade (1209–1229).
Luciferians	Strongly anti-Arian sect in Sardinia	Founded by Lucifer Calaritanus, a bishop of Cagliari	Deemed heretical by Jerome in his Altercatio Luciferiani et orthodoxi	
Macedonians or Pneumatomachians ("Spirit fighters")	While accepting the divinity of Jesus Christ as affirmed at Nicaea in 325, they denied that of the Holy Spirit which they saw as a creation of the Son, and a servant of the Father and the Son.	Allegedly founded in the 4th century by Bishop Macedonius I of Constantinople, Eustathius of Sebaste was their principal theologian.	Opposed by the Cappadocian Fathers and condemned at the First Council of Constantinople.	This is what prompted the addition of "And in the Holy Spirit, the Lord, the Giver of Life, Who proceedeth from the Father, Who with the Father and the Son is equally worshipped and glorified, Who spake by the Prophets", into the Nicene Creed at the second ecumenical council.
Melchisedechians	Considered Melchisedech an incarnation of the Logos (divine Word) and identified him with the Holy Ghost.		Refuted by Marcus Eremita in his book Eis ton Melchisedek ("Against the Melchisedekites")	It is uncertain whether the sect survived beyond the 9th century. They were probably scattered across Anatolia and the Balkans following the destruction of Tephrike.
Monarchianism	An overemphasis on the indivisibility of God (the Father) at the expense of the other "persons" of the Trinity leading to either Sabellianism (Modalism) or to Adoptionism.			Stressing the "monarchy" of God was in Eastern theology a legitimate way of affirming his oneness, also the Father as the unique source of divinity. It became heretical when pushed to the extremes indicated.
Monophysitism or Eutychianism	Belief that Christ's divinity dominates and overwhelms his humanity, as opposed to the Chalcedonian position which holds that Christ has two natures, one divine and one human or the Miaphysite position which holds that the human nature and pre-incarnate divine nature of Christ were united as one divine-human nature from the point of the Incarnation onwards.	After Nestorianism was rejected at the First Council of Ephesus, Eutyches emerged with diametrically opposite views.	Eutyches was excommunicated in 448. Monophysitism and Eutyches were rejected at the Council of Chalcedon in 451. Monophysitism is also rejected by the Oriental Orthodox Churches	
Monoenergism	Belief that Christ had only one "energy" (energeia). This is contrary to the orthodox interpretation of Christology, which teaches that Jesus Christ has two energies, divine and human	Originated as compromise with Oriental Orthodox churches by Emperor Heraclius in 622.	Monoenergism was officially condemned at the Third Council of Constantinople (the Sixth Ecumenical Council, 680–681).	
Monothelitism	Belief that Jesus Christ had two natures but only one will. This is contrary to the orthodox interpretation of Christology, which teaches that Jesus Christ has two wills (human and divine) corresponding to his two natures	Originated as compromise toward Oriental Orthodox churches by Emperor Heraclius in 638 AD	Monothelitism was officially condemned at the Third Council of Constantinople (the Sixth Ecumenical Council, 680–681). The churches condemned at Constantinople include the Oriental Orthodox Syriac, Armenian, and Coptic churches as well as the Maronite church, although the latter now deny that they ever held the Monothelite view and are presently in full communion with the Bishop of Rome. Christians in England rejected the Monothelite position at the Council of Hatfield in 680.	
Nestorianism	Belief that Jesus Christ was a natural union between the Flesh and the Word, thus not identical, to the divine Son of God.	Advanced by Nestorius (386–450), Patriarch of Constantinople from 428–431. The doctrine was informed by Nestorius' studies under Theodore of Mopsuestia at the School of Antioch.	Condemned at the First Council of Ephesus in 431 and the Council of Chalcedon in 451, leading to the Nestorian Schism.	Nestorius rejected the title Theotokos for the Virgin Mary, and proposed Christotokos as more suitable. Many of Nestorius' supporters relocated to Sassanid Persia, where they affiliated with the local Christian community, known as the Church of the East. Over the next decades, the Church of the East became increasingly Nestorian in doctrine, leading it to be known alternately as the Nestorian Church.
Patripassianism	Belief that the Father and Son are not two distinct persons, and thus God the Father suffered on the cross as Jesus.			similar to Sabellianism
Psilanthropism	Belief that Jesus is "merely human": either that he never became divine, or that he never existed prior to his incarnation as a man.	Propounded by Theodotus of Byzantium, a leather merchant, in Rome c.190, later revived by Paul of Samosata	Rejected by the ecumenical councils, especially in the First Council of Nicaea, which was convened to deal directly with the nature of Christ's divinity.	See Adoptionism
Sabellianism	Belief that the Father, Son and Holy Spirit are three characterizations of one God, rather than three distinct "persons" in one God.	First formally stated by Noetus of Smyrna c. 190, refined by Sabellius c. 210 who applied the names merely to different roles of God in the history and economy of salvation.	Noetus was condemned by the presbyters of Smyrna. Tertullian wrote Adversus Praxeam against this tendency and Sabellius was condemned by Pope Callistus.	Alternative names: Patripassianism, Modalism, Modalistic Monarchianism
Subordinationism	Belief the Son and the Holy Spirit are not co-equal with the Father. Subordinationists believe that the Son and the Holy Spirit are subordinate to the Father in either nature, role, or both.		Condemned as heretical in the Second Council of Constantinople.	
Tritheism	Belief that the Father, Son and Holy Spirit are three independent and distinct divine beings as opposed to three persons of one being and one essence			

=== Gnosticism ===
Gnosticism refers to a diverse, syncretistic religious movement consisting of various belief systems generally united in the teaching that humans are divine souls trapped in a material world created by an imperfect god, the demiurge, who is frequently identified with the Abrahamic God. Gnosticism is a rejection (sometimes from an ascetic perspective) and vilification of the human body and of the material world or cosmos. Gnosticism teaches duality in Material (Matter) versus Spiritual or Body (evil) versus Soul (good). Gnosticism teaches that the natural or material world will and should be destroyed (total annihilation) by the true spiritual God in order to free mankind from the reign of the false God or Demiurge.

A common misperception is caused by the fact that, in the past, "Gnostic" had a similar meaning to the current usage of the word mystic. There were some Orthodox Christians who as mystics (in the modern sense) taught gnosis (Knowledge of the God or the Good) who could be called gnostics in a positive sense (e.g. Diadochos of Photiki).

Whereas formerly Gnosticism was considered mostly a corruption of Christianity, it now seems clear that traces of Gnostic systems can be discerned some centuries before the Christian Era. Gnosticism may have been earlier than the 1st century, thus predating Jesus Christ. It spread through the Mediterranean and Middle East before and during the 2nd and 3rd centuries, becoming a dualistic heresy to Judaism (see Notzrim), Christianity and Hellenic philosophy in areas controlled by the Roman Empire and Arian Goths (see Huneric), and the Persian Empire. Conversion to Islam and the Albigensian Crusade (1209–1229) greatly reduced the remaining number of Gnostics throughout the Middle Ages, though a few isolated communities continue to exist to the present. Gnostic ideas became influential in the philosophies of various esoteric mystical movements of the late 19th and 20th centuries in Europe and North America, including some that explicitly identify themselves as revivals or even continuations of earlier gnostic groups.

Gnostic heresies
Heresy	Description	Origin	Official condemnation	Other
Simonians	A Gnostic sect that regarded Simon Magus as its founder and traced its doctrines back to him.	Founded in 2nd century Syria, Asia Minor, and Rome, lasted until 4th century.		
Manichaeism	A major dualistic religion stating that good and evil are equally powerful, and that material things are evil.	Founded in 210–276 AD by Mani	Condemned by Emperor Theodosius I decree in 382	Thrived between the 3rd and 7th centuries and appears to have died out before the 16th century except in southern China.
Paulicianism	A Gnostic and dualistic sect	The founder of the sect is said to have been an Armenian by the name of Constantine, who hailed from Mananalis, a community near Samosata.	Repressed by order of Empress Theodora II in 843	
Priscillianism	A Gnostic and Manichaean sect.	Founded in the 4th century by Priscillian, derived from the Gnostic-Manichaean doctrines taught by Marcus. Priscillian was put to death by the emperor Magnus Maximus for the crime of magic.	Condemned by Synod of Zaragoza in 380.	Increased during the 5th century despite efforts to stop it. In the 6th century, Priscillianism declined and died out soon after the Synod of Braga in 563.
Naassenes	A Gnostic sect from around 100 AD.	The Naassenes claimed to have been taught their doctrines by Mariamne, a disciple of James the Just.	Dealt as heresy by Hippolytus of Rome.	
Sethian	Belief that the snake in the Garden of Eden (Satan) was an agent of the true God and brought knowledge of truth to man via the fall of man.	Syrian sect drawing their origin from the Ophites.	Dealt as heresy by Irenaeus, Hippolytus, and Philaster.	Sect is founded around the Apocalypse of Adam.
Pasagians	A religious sect that retained Mosaic Law and believed in a Demiurge.	Appeared in Lombardy in the late 12th or early 13th century with possible oriental origin.	Treated as heresy by medieval theologians such as Bonacursus, Cardinal Humbert of Silva Candida and Gregory of Bergamo.	
Ophites	Belief that the serpent who tempted Adam and Eve was a hero and that the God who forbade Adam and Eve to eat from the tree of knowledge is the enemy.		Dealt as heresy by Hippolytus of Rome	
Valentianism	A Gnostic and dualistic sect.	Gnostic sect that was founded by Ex-Catholic Bishop Valentinus.	Considered heresy by Irenaeus and Epiphanius of Salamis.	

=== Other Early Church heresies ===
Other Christian heresies
Heresy	Description	Origin	Official condemnation	Other
Antinomianism	Any view which holds that Christians are freed by grace from obligations of any moral law. St Paul had to refute a charge of this type made by opponents because of his attitude to the Mosaic Law (Romans 3:8).	Some gnostics (e.g. Ophites and Nicolaitans) taught that since the matter was opposed to the spirit, the body was unimportant. Similar views were found among some anabaptists in the sixteenth century as a consequence of justification by faith and later among some sects in seventeenth-century England.	Decree on Justification, Chapter XV Council of Trent.	Few groups have declared themselves Antinomian, and the term has often been used by one group to criticize another's views.
Antidicomarians	Belief that rejected virgin birth of Christ and later, rejected perpetual virginity of Mary.	Helvidius.	Condemned per Consensus Patrum through Epiphanius of Salamis' Panarion.	
Audianism	Belief that God has the human form (anthropomorphism) and that one ought to celebrate Jesus' death during the Jewish Passover (quartodecimanism).	Named after the leader of the sect, Audius (or Audaeus), a Syrian who lived in the 4th century.	The First Council of Nicaea condemned quartodecimanism in 325. Cyril of Alexandria condemned it at his Adversus Anthropomorphites.	
Barallot	Held all things in common, even wives and children.			Were also called "Compliers" due to their love of sensual pleasures.
Circumcellions	A militant subset of Donatism*	See Donatism	Outlawed by Emperor Honorius in 408	Relied on violence.
Donatism (often spoken of as a "schism" rather than a "heresy")	Donatists were rigorists, holding that the church must be a church of saints, not sinners and that sacraments administered by traditores were invalid. They also regarded martyrdom as the supreme Christian virtue and regarded those that actively sought martyrdom as saints.	Named for their second leader Donatus Magnus.	Condemned by Pope Melchiades.	Donatists were a force at the time of Saint Augustine of Hippo and disappeared only after the Arab conquest.
Ebionites	A Jewish sect that insisted on the necessity of following Jewish law and rites, which they interpreted in light of Jesus' expounding of the Law. They regarded Jesus as the Messiah but not as divine.	The term Ebionites derives from the Hebrew evionim (אביונים ), meaning "the Poor Ones".	Justin Martyr considered them heretical at Dialogue with Trypho the Jew Chapter XLVII.	In 375, Epiphanius records the settlement of Ebionites on Cyprus, later Theodoret of Cyrrhus reported that they were no longer present there.
Euchites / Messalians	Belief that: 1. The essence (ousia) of the Trinity could be perceived by the carnal senses.; 2. The Threefold God transformed himself into a single hypostasis (substance) in order to unite with the souls of the perfect.; 3. God has taken different forms in order to reveal himself to the senses.; 4. Only such sensible revelations of God confer perfection upon the Christian.; 5. The state of perfection, freedom from the world and passion, is attained solely by prayer, not through the church or sacraments. ("Euchites" means "Those who pray")	Originating in Mesopotamia, they spread to Asia Minor and Thrace.	Bishop Meletius of Antioch condemned them about 376.	The group might have continued for several centuries, influencing the Bogomils of Bulgaria, the Bosnian church, the Paterenes and Catharism.
Iconoclasm	The belief that icons are idols and should be destroyed.	From late in the seventh century onwards some parts of the Greek Church reacted against the veneration of icons. In 726 Emperor Leo III ordered the destruction of all icons and persecuted those who refused. The policy continued under his successors till about 780. Later Leo V launched a second attempt which continued till the death of the emperor Theophilus in 842.	Condemned by Nicea II in 787 which regulated the veneration.	Leo III may have been motivated by the belief that the veneration of icons, particularly in the excessive form it often took, was the chief obstacle to the conversion of Jews and Muslims.
Marcionism	An Early Christian dualist belief system. Marcion affirmed Jesus Christ as the saviour sent by God and Paul as his chief apostle, but he rejected the Hebrew Bible and the Hebrew God. Marcionists believed that the wrathful Hebrew God was a separate and lower entity than the all-forgiving God of the New Testament. This belief was in some ways similar to Gnostic Christian theology, but in other ways different.	Originates in the teachings of Marcion of Sinope at Rome around the year 144.	Many early apologists, such as Tertullian on his Adversus Marcionem (year 207) condemned Marcionism.	Marcionism continued in the West for 300 years, although Marcionistic ideas persisted much longer. Marcionism continued in the East for some centuries later. Similar heresies would arise with Catharism in 1200s France and Positive Christianity in Nazi Germany.
Montanism	The beliefs of Montanism contrasted with orthodox Christianity in the following ways: The belief that the prophecies of the Montanists superseded and fulfilled the doctrines proclaimed by the Apostles.; The encouragement of ecstatic prophesying.; The view that Christians who fell from grace could not be redeemed.; A stronger emphasis on the avoidance of sin and church discipline, emphasizing chastity, including forbidding remarriage.; Some of the Montanists were also "Quartodeciman".	Named for its founder Montanus, Montanism originated at Hierapolis. It spread rapidly to other regions in the Roman Empire during the period before Christianity was generally tolerated or legal.	The churches of Asia Minor excommunicated Montanists. Around 177, Apollinarius, Bishop of Hierapolis, presided over a synod which condemned the New Prophecy. The leaders of the churches of Lyon and Vienne in Gaul responded to the New Prophecy in 177.	Although the orthodox mainstream Christian church prevailed against Montanism within a few generations, labelling it a heresy, the sect persisted in some isolated places into the 8th century.
Pelagianism	Belief that original sin did not taint human nature and that mortal will is still capable of choosing good or evil without Divine aid.	Named after Pelagius (354–420/440). The theology was later developed by C(a)elestius and Julian of Eclanum into a complete system. and refuted by Augustine of Hippo (who had for a time (385–395) held similar opinions) but his final position never gained general acceptance in the East.	Pelagianism was attacked in the Council of Diospolis and condemned in 418 at the Council of Carthage and the decision confirmed at the Council of Ephesus in 431.	
Semipelagianism	Belief that Augustine had gone too far in attacking Pelagianism and taught that some come to faith by mercy and grace but others through free will alone.	This view arose in the East and was purportedly taught by John Cassian, who was opposed by Prosper of Aquitaine. Whether Cassian taught this is disputable.	Condemned by the Council of Orange in 529 which slightly weakened some of Augustine's more extreme statements.	The label "Semipelagianism" dates from the seventeenth century.

== Medieval heresies ==
Medieval heresies
Heresy	Description	Origin	Official condemnation	Other
Bogomils	A Gnostic dualistic sect that was both Adoptionist and Manichaean. Their beliefs were a synthesis of Armenian Paulicianism and the Bulgarian Slavonic Church reform movement.	Emerged in Bulgaria between 927 and 970 and spread into the Byzantine Empire, Serbia, Bosnia, Italy and France.		
Berengarians	A proto-Protestant religious sect that adhered to the views of Berengar of Tours, Archdeacon of Angers, and opposed several key Roman Catholic doctrines in the mid-11th century. They opposed the doctrine of Transubstantiation, the practice of infant baptism, and private sacramental confession.	Berengar of Tours		
Joachimites	a millenarian group arose from the Franciscans in the thirteenth century. They based their ideas on the prior works of Joachim of Fiore (c. 1135 – 1202), though rejecting the Church of their day more strongly than he had.	Joachim of Fiore (c. 1135 – 1202)	Condemned by Fourth Council of the Lateran.	
Catharism	Catharism had its roots in the Paulician movement in Armenia and the Bogomils of Bulgaria, with a strong dualist influence against the physical world, regarded as evil, thus denied that Jesus could become incarnate and still be the son of God.	First appeared in the Languedoc region of France in the 11th century and flourished in the 12th and 13th centuries. Catharism had its roots in the Paulicians and the Bogomils with whom the Paulicians merged.	Condemned by papal bull Ad abolendam.	After several decades of harassment and re-proselytizing, and the systematic destruction of their scripture, the sect was exhausted and could find no more adepts. The last known Cathar prefect in the Languedoc, Guillaume Bélibaste, was executed in 1321. Anti-Old Testament ideas later revived by Positive Christianity in Nazi Germany.
Free Spirit	Mixed mystical beliefs with Christianity. Its practitioners believed that it was possible to reach perfection on earth through a life of austerity and spiritualism. They believed that they could communicate directly with God and did not need the Christian church for intercession.		Condemned at the Council of Basel in 1431.	Small groups living mostly in Bohemia, now the Czech Republic, during the 14th and 15th centuries.
Apostolic Brethren	A sect that rejected the worldliness of the church and sought a life of perfect sanctity, in complete poverty, with no fixed domicile, no care for the morrow, and no vows.	founded in northern Italy in the latter half of the 13th century by Gerard Segarelli, a native of Alzano in the territory of Parma.	Pope Honorius IV issued a severe reprobation to them in 1286, and Pope Nicholas IV renewed it in 1290.	Evolved into Dulcinians under Fra Dolcino of Novara.
Arnoldists	A Proto-Protestant group in the 12th century, named after Arnold of Brescia that preached against infant baptism, transubstantiation, and Papal temporal power.	Arnold of Brescia	condemned as heretics by Pope Lucius III in Ad abolendam during the Synod of Verona in 1184.	
Fraticelli (Spiritual Franciscans)	Extreme proponents of the rule of Saint Francis of Assisi, especially with regard to poverty, and regarded the wealth of the Church as scandalous, and that of individual churchmen as invalidating their status.	Appeared in the 14th and 15th centuries, principally in Italy.	Declared heretical by the Church in 1296 by Boniface VIII.	
Petrobrusians	A proto-Protestant group that considered the New Testament epistles to have a subordinate authority, questioning their apostolic origin, and rejected the authority of the Old Testament.	Peter of Bruys	Condemned at the Second Lateran Council in 1139.	
Henricians	According to Peter of Cluny, Henry's teaching is summed up as follows: Rejection of the doctrinal and disciplinary authority of the church; Recognition of the Gospel freely interpreted as the sole rule of faith; Refusal to recognize any form of worship or liturgy; and; Condemnation of; the baptism of infants, the Eucharist, the sacrifice of the Mass, the communion of saints, and; prayers for the dead.	Henry of Lausanne lived in France in the first half of the 12th century. His preaching began around 1116 and he died imprisoned around 1148.		In 1151 some Henricians still remained in Languedoc, for Matthew Paris relates that a young girl, who gave herself out to be miraculously inspired by the Virgin Mary, was reputed to have converted a great number of the disciples of Henry of Lausanne.
Triclavianism	Belief that three, rather than four, nails were used to crucify Christ and that a Roman soldier pierced him with a spear on the left, rather than the right side.	Attributed to Albigenses and Waldenses.	Supposedly condemned by Pope Innocent III, but most likely never actually considered a heresy by said Pope.	
Waldensians (Waldenses or Vaudois)	A spiritual movement of the later Middle Ages.	Begun by Peter Waldo, a wealthy merchant who decided to give up all his worldly possessions and began to preach on the streets of Lyon in 1177.	Condemned by papal bull Ad abolendam.	Waldensians endured near annihilation in the 17th century. Descendants of this movement still exist. Over time, the denomination joined the Genevan or Reformed branch of Protestantism.
Conciliarism			Condemned by papal bull Execrabilis.	

== Renaissance ==
Precursors to the Protestant Reformation
Heresy	Description	Origin	Official condemnation	Other
Hussites	The program of the Hussites is contained in the four articles of Prague, which were agreed upon in July 1420. These are often summarized as: 1. Freedom to preach the Word of God.; 2. Celebration of the Lord's Supper in both kinds (bread and wine to priests and laity alike).; 3. No secular power for the clergy.; 4. Punishment for mortal sins.	Founded by Czech reformer Jan Hus (c. 1369–1415), who was one of the forerunners of the Protestant Reformation.	Condemned by Council of Basel.	Fragmented into Neo-Adamites, Taborites, and eventually, Unitas Fratrum.
Lollardy	English group that advocated translating the Bible into English, rejected baptism and confession, and denied the doctrine of transubstantiation.	Founded by John Wycliffe	King Henry IV passed the De heretico comburendo in 1401, which did not specifically ban the Lollards, but prohibited translating or owning the Bible and authorised burning heretics at the stake.	Lollards were effectively absorbed into Protestantism during the English Reformation, in which Lollardy played a role.
Girolamo Savonarola	Savonarola called for simplicity in church interior and rigorous moral stances		On 13 May 1497 Savonarola was excommunicated by Pope Alexander VI and burned at the stake.	Savonarola left many admirers throughout Europe, in particular among religiously pious humanists.

== Reformation ==
Reformation
Heresy	Description	Origin	Official condemnation	Other
Protestantism	The five solae are five Latin phrases (or slogans) that emerged during the Protestant Reformation and summarize the Reformers' basic theological beliefs in opposition to the teaching of the Catholic Church of the day.: Solus Christus: Christ alone.; Sola scriptura: Scripture alone. Only Scripture is the infallible rule of faith and practice.; Sola fide: Faith alone, rejecting the value of good works or prayers towards salvation.; Sola gratia: Grace alone. The human initiative has no part in salvation.; Soli Deo gloria: Glory to God alone. Devotion to Mary and the Saints was strongly discouraged.	Originated in the 16th century Protestant Reformation which is generally accepted to have begun in 1517 with Martin Luther's Ninety-five Theses as an attempt to reform the Catholic Church.	Exsurge Domine and Council of Trent	There are "over 33,000 denominations in 238 countries". There are about 1.17 billion Protestants worldwide, constituting nearly half of all Christians. among approximately 1.5–2.1 billion Christians. In addition to the Five Solas, most Protestants disbelieve transubstantiation. See Eucharistic heresies below.
Socinianism	A heresy that denied the Trinity and the divinity of Jesus Christ. Socinians believed that Jesus was a human being who was inspired by God.	Developed and co-founded during the Protestant Reformation by the Italian Renaissance humanists and theologians Lelio Sozzini and Fausto Sozzini, uncle and nephew, respectively.	The formal condemnation of Socinianism appeared first in the Constitution of Paul IV, Cum quorundam, in 1555 and confirmed in 1603 by Pope Clement VIII, through Dominici gregis.	
Calvinism	The belief that God chooses to save certain people, not because of any foreseen merit or good in themselves, but totally by his sovereign choice. Calvinism has been summed up in five points, known as TULIP.: Total depravity, of humanity.; Unconditional election. God chooses those he wants to save regardless of merit by predestination.; Limited atonement. Jesus died only for the chosen elect.; Irresistible grace. God's saving grace cannot be resisted.; Perseverance, or "Eternal Security". One cannot lose their salvation.	Calvinism was systemised by John Calvin in mid 16th century Geneva, being further rigorised at the Dutch 17th century Synod of Dort.	Cum occasione and the Council of Trent (Section VI, Canons 9, 4, 17, and 23)	Calvinism forms the basis of the doctrines of the Reformed churches, including those of the Netherlands, England, Scotland, and central Europe. Presbyterians, Congregationalists, some Baptist groups, and early Anglicans were influenced by Calvinist teachings. This influence can be found in official documents of these churches: the Three Forms of Unity (Dutch Reformed), the Westminster Confession (Presbyterian), the Savoy Declaration (Congregational), the 1689 London Baptist Confession of Faith (Reformed Baptist), and the Thirty-Nine Articles (Anglican).

== Sects declared to be heretical by the Catholic Church ==
=== Protestantism ===
Heresy	Description	Origin	Official condemnation	Other
Protestantism	Protestant groups display a wide variety of different doctrines. However, the early Reformers all stressed the five solae (1) Sola scriptura ("by Scripture alone"); the conviction that only the Scriptures of the Old and New Testaments should be used to form doctrine, in contradistinction to the Catholic view that both Scripture and the magisterium of the Church set dogma. (2) Sola fide ("by faith alone"); the conviction that believers are justified by faith in Christ alone, rather than faith in Christ and good works. (3) Sola gratia ("by grace alone"); the conviction that believers are saved by God's grace alone, and not by human works. (4) Solus Christus ("by Christ alone"); the conviction that the work of salvation is entirely the work of God through the mediatorial work of Christ alone. (5) Soli Deo gloria ("for God's glory alone"); the conviction that the work of salvation is entirely for God's glory alone. Some believe the great diversity of Protestant doctrines stems from the doctrine of private judgment, which denies the infallible authority of the Catholic Church and claims that each individual is to interpret Scripture for himself. However, the early Reformers warned against private interpretation, emphasizing, instead, the connection and continuity with the ancient church, and its dogma.	Began with Martin Luther's 95 Theses in 1517, and later developed by other Protestant Reformers.	Condemned by the Council of Trent, held in Trento, Italy from 1545 to 1563.	Since the mid-20th century, the attitude of the Catholic Church to Protestantism has changed, as evidenced by ecumenical relations with Protestant Churches. Then-cardinal Joseph Ratzinger, much later Pope Benedict XVI, wrote that Heresy, for Scripture and the early Church, includes the idea of a personal decision against the unity of the Church, and heresy's characteristic is pertinacia, the obstinacy of him who persists in his own private way... Protestantism today is something different from heresy in the traditional sense, a phenomenon whose true theological place has not yet been determined.

=== Counter-Reformation movements ===
Heresy	Description	Origin	Official condemnation	Other
Febronianism	An 18th-century German movement directed towards the nationalizing of Catholicism, the restriction of the power of the papacy in favour of that of the episcopate, and the reunion of the dissident churches with Catholic Christendom.	Johann Nikolaus von Hontheim	Practice and ideology condemned by Pope Pius IX's Syllabus of Errors, Pope Leo XIII's encyclical Immortale Dei, and the First Vatican Council.	Compare with Erastianism
Gallicanism	The belief that civil authority – often the State's authority (originally that of the King of France) – over the Catholic Church is comparable to that of the Pope.		Practice and ideology condemned by Pope Pius VI's Auctorem fidei, Pope Pius IX's Syllabus of Errors, Pope Leo XIII's encyclical Immortale Dei, and the First Vatican Council.	Compare with Erastianism
Josephinism	The domestic policies of Joseph II of Austria, attempting to impose a liberal ideology on the Church.		Practice and ideology condemned by Pope Pius IX's Syllabus of Errors, Pope Leo XIII's encyclical Immortale Dei, and the First Vatican Council.	Compare with Erastianism
Jansenism	A branch of Catholic thought which arose in the frame of the Counter-Reformation and the aftermath of the Council of Trent (1545–1563). It emphasized original sin, human depravity, the necessity of divine grace, and predestination.	Originating in the writings of the Dutch theologian Cornelius Otto Jansen, Jansenism formed a distinct movement within the Catholic Church from the 16th to 18th centuries.	Condemned by Innocent X's bull Cum occasione on 31 May 1653, and by Pope Pius VI's Auctorem fidei.	
Quietism	A religious movement within the Catholic Church which held that Christians should do nothing so as to not impede God's active will, and that men ought to remain silent.	Miguel de Molinos and Jeanne Guyon	Pope Innocent XI issued Coelestis Pastor on 20 November 1687.	

=== 19th century ===
19th century heresies
Heresy	Description	Origin	Official condemnation	Other
Americanism	A group of related heresies which were defined as the endorsement of full freedom of the press, liberalism, individualism, and separation of church and state, and as an insistence upon individual initiative, which could be incompatible with the principle of Catholicism of obedience to authority.		Condemned by Pope Leo XIII in his letter Testem benevolentiae nostrae in 1899.	
Jehovah's Witnesses	Religious movement which expects the imminent return of Jesus. Jehovah's Witnesses believe in a one-person God as opposed to the Trinity. Jesus is the first thing God created (as Michael the Archangel).	It follows the teachings of Charles Taze Russell.		
Modernism	Evolution of dogma in time and space.	Alfred Loisy, George Tyrell and Ernesto Buonaiuti	Condemned by Popes Leo XIII and Pius X in a series of encyclicals between 1893 and 1910.	
Mormonism	Religious movement that believes in a "Godhead" of separate and distinct beings: Father, Son, and Holy Spirit, as well as a Heavenly Mother. Further, it is believed that all humans as children of God can become exalted, or in other words, "As man now is God once was: As God now is, a man may be."	Joseph Smith founded the movement in Western New York in the 1820s, and published The Book of Mormon, which he claimed to have translated from writing on golden plates in a reformed Egyptian language.		Mormons would say that theirs is the truest form of Christianity while acknowledging that other Christian denominations hold a lesser truth. While accepting the validity of the traditional Christian Bible, Mormons also attribute scriptural authority to the Book of Mormon, the Doctrine and Covenants, and the Pearl of Great Price. Mormons believe in the divinity of Jesus Christ but do not accept the doctrine of the Trinity. Mormons worship Jesus Christ and God the Father exclusively (and not Joseph Smith, whom they believe to have been a prophet only), and by this qualification meet the definition of non-Trinitarian Christianity. Many Protestant sects do not accept Mormons as true Christians, however, and no major Christian group accepts the validity of Mormon baptisms – a former Mormon would need to be re-baptized.

=== 20th-century movements ===
Heresy	Description	Origin	Official condemnation	Other
Community of the Lady of All Nations	The movement believes that its elderly founder, Marie Paule Giguère is a "reincarnation" of the Virgin Mary.	Founded by Marie Paule Giguère in Quebec in 1971.	The Congregation for the Doctrine of the Faith determined on 11 July 2007 that her followers had been excommunicated.	Also known as Army of Mary
Positive Christianity	A term adopted by Nazi leaders to refer to a model of Christianity consistent with Nazism.		Condemned by Pope Pius XI in his letter Mit brennender Sorge in 1937.	
Reincarnationism	Belief that certain people are or can be reincarnations of biblical figures, such as Jesus Christ and the Virgin Mary.		Doctrinal Note of the Catholic Bishops of Canada concerning the Army of Mary and Tribus circiter on the Mariavites.	
Santa Muerte	Worship or veneration of Santa Muerte.		Criticized, called blasphemous, described as devil worship, and declared incompatible with the Christian faith by Catholic leaders, including the Catholic Archdiocese of Mexico City and some Catholic Bishops in the United States Cardinal Gianfranco Ravasi, President of the Pontifical Council for Culture, has repeatedly denounced devotion to Santa Muerte, calling it "the celebration of devastation and of hell." Commentators note that it is relatively rare that a folk saint is condemned by Vatican officials.	

== See also ==
- Christian heresy
- Outline of Christianity
- Outline of Catholicism
- Outline of the Catholic ecumenical councils
- Phyletism
