= Heresy in Christianity =

Formal denial or doubt of a core Christian doctrine

Heresy in Christianity is the formal denial or doubt of a core doctrine of the Christian faith as defined by one or more of the Christian churches.

As Christianity became established as a church, it defined orthodoxy and combated deviation from it by developing ecclesiastical, universal, and ecumenical councils. Excommunication, inquisition, and execution (by civil authorities) were used against heretics who refused to recant, and major heresies were sometimes dealt with by military crusades. With the growth of toleration and ecumenicalism, inquisitions have been abandoned.

The first Christian executed for heresy was Priscillian in 385 AD, and the last was Cayetano Ripoll, (accused of Deism) in 1826 AD. Some notable heresies in Christian history have been Arianism, Marcionism, Donatism, Catharism, Docetism, Gnosticism, Pelagianism, Nestorianism, and Conciliarism.

== Etymology ==
The word heresy comes from haeresis, a Latin transliteration of the Greek word αἵρεσις originally meaning choosing, choice, course of action, or in an extended sense a sect or school of thought, which by the first century came to denote warring factions and the party spirit. The word appears in the New Testament, usually translated as sect, and was appropriated by the Church to mean a sect or division that threatened the unity of Christians. Heresy eventually became regarded as a departure from orthodoxy, a sense in which heterodoxy was already in Christian use soon after the year 100.

== Definition ==
Heresy (in Christianity) is used today to denote the formal denial or doubt of a core doctrine of the Christian faith as defined by one or more of the Christian churches. It is distinguished from both apostasy and schism, apostasy being nearly always total abandonment of the Christian faith after it has been freely accepted, and schism being a formal and deliberate breach of Christian unity and an offense against charity without being based essentially on doctrine.

== Early Christianity (1st century – c. 325) ==
=== Development of orthodoxy ===
The development of doctrine, the position of orthodoxy, and the relationship between the early Church and early heretical groups is a matter of academic debate. Walter Bauer, in his Orthodoxy and Heresy in Earliest Christianity (1934/1971), (Note: Rechtgläubigkeit und Ketzerei im ältesten Christentum Tübingen 1934 (a second edition, edited by Georg Strecker, Tübingen 1964, was translated as Orthodoxy and Heresy in Earliest Christianity 1971).) proposed that in earliest Christianity, orthodoxy and heresy did not stand in relation to one another as primary to secondary, but in many regions heresy was the original manifestation of Christianity. Bauer reassessed as a historian the overwhelmingly dominant view (Note: Bauer (1964:3f) instanced Origen, Commentarius II in Cant., and Sel. in Proverb. and Tertullian, De praescript. haer. 36 as espousing the traditional theory of the relation of heresy.) that for the period of Christian origins, ecclesiastical doctrine already represented what is primary, while heresies, on the other hand somehow are a deviation from the genuine (Bauer, "Introduction").

Scholars such as Pagels and Ehrman have built on Bauer's original thesis. Drawing upon distinctions between Jewish Christians, Gentile Christians, and other groups such as Gnostics and Marcionites, they argue that early Christianity was fragmented, and with contemporaneous competing orthodoxies. Ehrman's view is that while the specifics of Bauer's demonstration were later rejected, his intuitions are broadly accepted by scholars and were confirmed beyond what Bauer might have guessed.

According to H. E. W. Turner, responding to Bauer's thesis in 1954, "what became official orthodoxy was taught early on by the majority of church teachers, albeit not in fully developed form." According to Darrell Bock, a Christian apologist, Bauer's theory does not show an equality between the established church and outsiders including Simon Magus. (Note: According to Gregory & Tuckett, Bock "is not an expert on the Christian Apocrypha, and his shortcomings are often apparent.") According to Mitchell et al., each early Christian community was unique, but the tenets of the mainstream or catholic Church ensured that each early Christian community did not remain isolated.

=== Diversity ===
The Ante-Nicene period (2nd–3rd century) saw the rise of a great number of Christian sects, cults and movements with strong unifying characteristics lacking in the apostolic period. They had different interpretations of Scripture, particularly the divinity of Jesus and the nature of the Trinity. Some of the major sects, cults and movements with different interpretations of Scripture from those of the Proto-Orthodox church were:

- Gnosticism (particularly Valentinianism) – reliance on revealed knowledge from an unknowable God, a distinct divinity from the Demiurge who created and oversees the material world.
- Marcionism – the God of Jesus was a different God from the God of the Old Testament.
- Montanism – relied on prophetic revelations from the Holy Spirit.
- Adoptionism – Jesus was not born the Son of God, but was adopted at his baptism, resurrection or ascension.
- Sabellianism – Belief that the Father, Son and Holy Spirit are three synonymous one person of God, rather than three distinct "persons" within one God. Also known as Modalism and Patripassianism.
- Docetism – Jesus was pure spirit and his physical form an illusion.

=== Proto-orthodoxy ===
Before AD 313 there was no true mechanism in place to resolve the various differences of beliefs within the early Christian Church. Heresy was to be approached by the leader of the church, according to Eusebius, author of the Church History.

== Late Antiquity (313–476) and Early Middle Ages (476–799) ==
=== Christology ===
The earliest controversies in Late Antiquity were generally Christological in nature, concerned with the interpretation of Jesus' (eternal) divinity and/or humanity. In the 4th century, Arius and Arianism held that Jesus, while not primarily mortal, was not always divine and was, therefore, of lesser status than God the Father. Arianism was condemned at the Council of Nicea (325) but nevertheless was widely believed in the church of that century. Trinitarianism held that God the Father, God the Son, and the Holy Spirit were all strictly one being with three hypostases. The Euchites, a 4th-century antinomian sect from Mesopotamia, held that the triune God transformed himself into a single hypostasis to unite with the souls of the perfect. Euchites were anti-clerical and rejected baptism and the sacraments, believing that the passions could be overcome and perfection achieved through prayer.

Many groups held dualistic beliefs, maintaining that reality was composed of two radically opposing parts: matter, usually seen as evil, and spirit, seen as good. Docetism held that Jesus's humanity was merely an illusion, thus denying the incarnation. Others held that both the material and spiritual worlds were created by God, and therefore both were good, and that these two realms were represented in the unified divine and human natures of Jesus.

=== Legal suppression of heresies ===
The legalisation of Christianity under Constantine I in AD 313 led to the uniformity of proto-orthodox beliefs and the formulation of dogma through canons from the ecumenical councils. The first known usage of the term 'heresy' in a civil legal context was in 380 by the "Edict of Thessalonica" of Theodosius I. Before the issuance of this edict, the Church lacked state-sponsored support for any specific legal mechanism to address what it identified as 'heresy.' With this edict, the distinction between the Church and the Roman government became less clear. One of the outcomes of this blurring of Church and State was a sharing of State powers of legal enforcement between Church and State authorities, with the state enforcing what it determined to be orthodox teaching. Within five years of the official criminalization of heresy by the emperor, the first Christian heretic, Priscillian, was executed in 385 by Roman officials.

A few decades later, the edict of Theodosius II (435) provided severe punishments for those who had or spread writings of Nestorius. Those who possessed writings of Arius were sentenced to death.

=== Ecumenical councils ===
Seven ecumenical councils were convened between 325 and 787. These were primarily concerned with Christological disputes:

- The First Ecumenical Council - ordered by Emperor Constantine at Nicaea in 325, with Pope Alexander I of Alexandria presiding over more than 300 bishops who condemned Arius' view that the Son is a created being inferior to the Father.
- The Second Ecumenical Council - held at Constantinople in 381 by initiative of Emperor Theodosius I, with the patriarchs of Alexandria, Constantinople, and Antioch presiding over 150 bishops. It decided and declared that the Holy Spirit is as divine as the God the Father and Son of God, and is co-equal Holy Trinity. This council also condemned Apollinarianism.
- The Third Ecumenical Council - held in Ephesus by the initiative of Emperor Theodosius II, in 431 with Pope Cyril of Alexandria presiding over with 250 bishops. It was mired in controversy because of the absence of the patriarchs of Constantinople and Antioch, the absence of the Syrian clergy, and violence directed against the archbishop of Constantinople, Nestorius, and his supporters. It affirmed hypostatic union and that Mary is the "Bearer of God" (Theotokos), contrary to the teachings of Nestorius, whom it anathematized. The Council also anathematized Pelagianism which followers were granted asylum by Nestorius
- The Fourth Ecumenical Council - held in Chalcedon by the initiatives of Emperor Marcian in 451, with the Anatolius of Constantinople presiding over 500 bishops. This council affirmed that Jesus has two natures: God and man, distinct yet always in perfect union. It was based largely on Pope Leo I's Tome. It condemned both eutychian and miaphysite forms of monophysitism espoused by Eutyches and Pope Dioscorus I of Alexandria respectively.
- The Fifth Ecumenical Council - held in Constantinople in 553 by the initiatives of Emperor Justinian I. It was presided by Patriarch Eutychius of Constantinople interpreted the decrees of Chalcedon and further explained the relationship between Jesus's two natures; it also condemned the teachings of Origen on the pre-existence of the soul.
- The Sixth Ecumenical Council - held in Constantinople in 681 by Emperor Constantine IV and was presided by Patriarch George I of Constantinople, declaring that Jesus had two energies and two wills of His two natures, human and divine, contrary to the teachings of the monoenergist and monothelites.
- The Seventh Ecumenical Council - called by Empress Regent Irene of Athens in 787 and held in Nicaea. It was presided by Patriarch Tarasios of Constantinople and promulgated the veneration of icons while forbidding their worship. It was reinforced by "The Triumph of Orthodoxy" after end of second Iconoclasm.

Not all these Councils have been universally recognised as ecumenical. In addition, the Catholic Church has convened numerous other councils that it deems have the same authority, making a total of twenty-one Ecumenical Councils recognised by the Catholic Church.

The Assyrian Church of the East accepts only the first two, and Oriental Orthodoxy only three. Pope Sergius I rejected the Quinisext Council of 692 (see also Pentarchy). The Fourth Council of Constantinople of 869–870 and 879–880 are disputed by Catholicism and Eastern Orthodoxy.

Present-day nontrinitarians, such as Unitarians, Latter-day Saints and other Mormons, and Jehovah's Witnesses, reject all seven Councils.

Some Eastern Orthodox consider the following council to be ecumenical, although this is not universally agreed upon:

1. The Fifth Council of Constantinople was actually a series of councils held between 1341 and 1351. It affirmed the hesychastic theology of St. Gregory Palamas and condemned the philosopher Barlaam of Calabria.
2. In addition to these councils, several significant councils have been meant to define the Eastern Orthodox position further. They are the Synods of Constantinople in 1484, 1583, 1755, 1819, and 1872, the Synod of Iași, 1642, and the Pan-Orthodox Synod of Jerusalem, 1672. Some individual examples of the execution of Eastern Orthodox heretics do exist, such as the execution of Avvakum in 1682.

== High Middle Ages (800–1299) and Late Middle Ages and the early Renaissance (1300–1520) ==
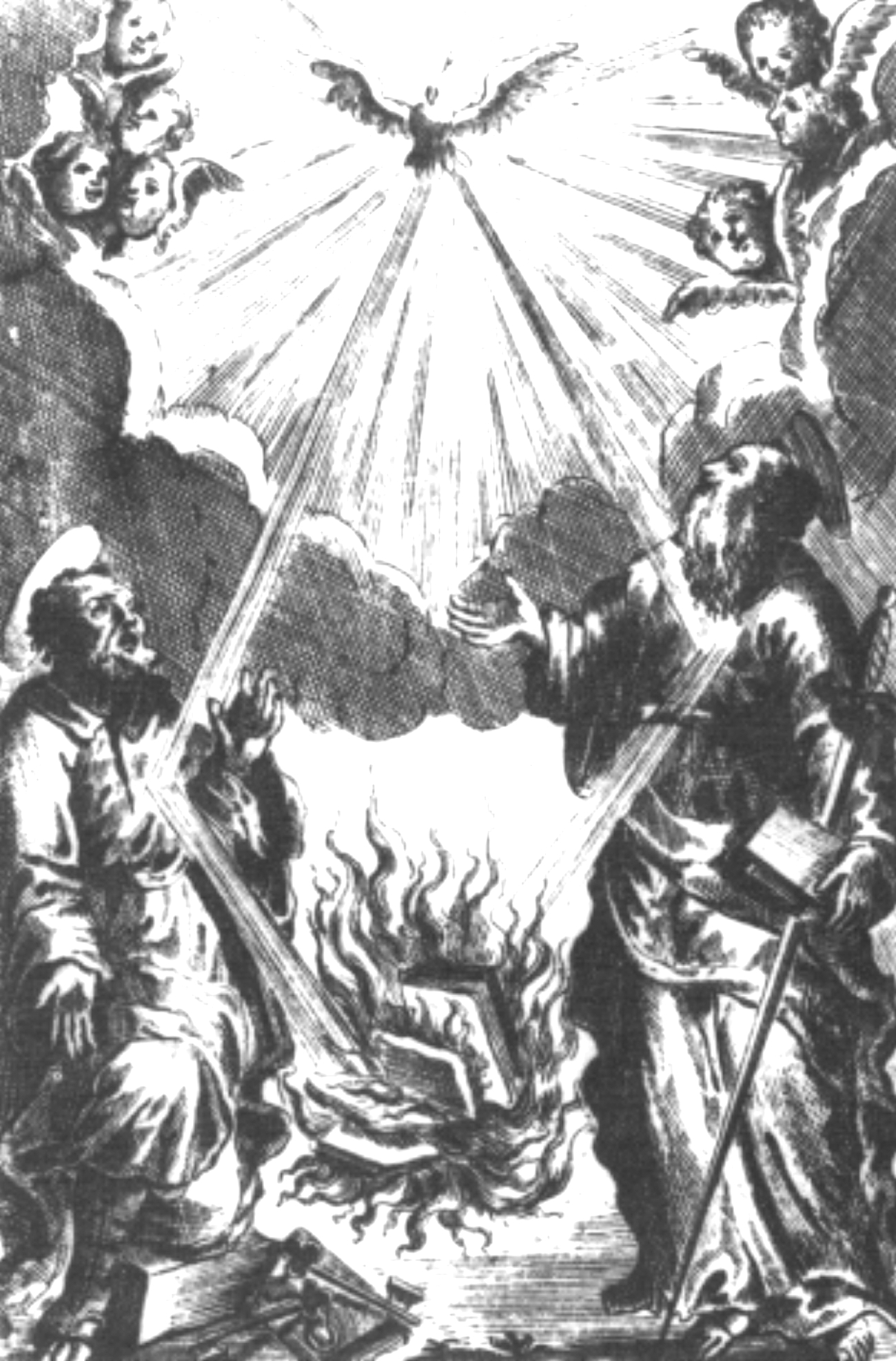
This 1711 illustration for the Index Librorum Prohibitorum depicts the Holy Ghost supplying the book burning fire.

From the late 11th century onward, heresy once again came to be a concern for Catholic authorities, as reports became increasingly common. The reasons for this are still not fully understood, but the causes for this new period of heresy include popular response to the 11th-century clerical reform movement, greater lay familiarity with the Bible, exclusion of lay people from sacramental activity, and more rigorous definition and supervision of Catholic dogma. The question of how heresy should be suppressed was not resolved, and there was initially substantial clerical resistance to the use of physical force by secular authorities to correct spiritual deviance. As heresy was viewed with increasing concern by the papacy, however, the secular arm was used more frequently and freely during the 12th century and afterward.

=== Medieval heresies ===
There were many Christian sects, cults, movements and individuals throughout the Middle Ages whose teachings were deemed heretical by the established church, such as:

- Paulicians – an Armenian group (6th to 9th centuries) who sought a return to the purity of the church at the time of Paul the Apostle.
- Tondrakians – an Armenian group (9th to 11th centuries) who advocated the abolition of the Church along with all its traditional rites.
- Bogomils – a group arising in the 11th century in Bulgaria who sought a return to the spirituality of the early Christians and opposed established forms of government and church.
- Berengarians – a proto-Protestant religious sect that adhered to the views of Berengar of Tours, Archdeacon of Angers, and opposed the doctrine of Transubstantiation, the practice of infant baptism, and private sacramental confession in the mid-11th century.
- Gundolfo – an itinerant 11th century preacher near Lille, France, who taught that salvation was achieved through a virtuous life of abandoning the world, restraining the appetites of the flesh, earning food by the labor of hands, doing no injury to anyone, and extending charity to everyone of their own faith.
- Cathars – a major Christian movement in the Languedoc region of southern France from the 12th to 14th centuries. The Cathars believed that human souls were the spirits of angels trapped within the physical creation of an evil god. Through living a pure and sinless life, the soul could become perfect and free from the snare of matter.
- Arnoldists – a 12th-century group, inspired by the example of controversial figure Arnold of Brescia (c. 1090 – June 1155), from Lombardy who criticized the wealth of the Catholic Church and preached against baptism and the Eucharist.
- Petrobrusians – 12th century followers of Peter of Bruys in southeastern France that considered the New Testament epistles to have a subordinate authority, questioning their apostolic origin, and rejected the authority of the Old Testament.
- Henricans were 12th century followers of Henry of Lausanne in France. They rejected the doctrinal and disciplinary authority of the church, did not recognize any form of worship or liturgy and denied the sacraments.
- Waldensians – a movement that began in the 12th century in Lyon, France, and still exists today. They held that Apostolic poverty was the way to spiritual perfection and rejected what they perceived as the idolatry of the Catholic Church.
- Joachimites – a millenarian group arose from the Franciscans in the thirteenth century. They based their ideas on the prior works of Joachim of Fiore (c. 1135 – 1202), though rejecting the Church of their day more strongly than he had.
- Humiliati – a 12th-century group from northern Italy who embraced poverty, charity and mortification. Initially approved by the church, they were suppressed for disobedience in 1571.
- Pasagians – a religious sect which appeared in Lombardy in the late 12th or early 13th century that retained Mosaic Law and believed in a Demiurge.
- Brethren of the Free Spirit – a term applied in the 13th century to those, primarily in the Low Countries, Germany, France, Bohemia and northern Italy, who believed that the sacraments were unnecessary for salvation, that the soul could be perfected through imitating the life of Christ, and that the perfected soul was free of sin and beyond all ecclesiastical, moral and secular law.
- Apostolic Brethren (later known as Dulcinians) – a 13th to 14th century sect from northern Italy founded by Gerard Segarelli and continued by Fra Dolcino of Novara. The Apostolic Brethren rejected the worldliness of the church and sought a life of perfect sanctity, in complete poverty, with no fixed domicile, no care for the morrow, and no vows.
- Fraticelli (or Spiritual Franciscans) – Franciscan through the 13th to 15th centuries who regarded the wealth of the Church as scandalous.
- Neo-Adamites – a term applied in the 13th to 15th century to those, including Taborites, Picards and some Beghards, who wished to return to the purity of the life of Adam by living communally, practicing social and religious nudity, embracing free love and rejecting marriage and individual ownership of property.
- Nicholas of Basel – a 14th-century Swiss leader who, after a spiritual experience, taught that he had the authority to use episcopal and priestly powers (even though he was not ordained), that submission to his direction was necessary for attaining spiritual perfection, and that his followers could not sin even though they committed crimes or disobeyed both the Church and pope.
- Lollards – the 14th century followers of John Wycliffe. They advocated translating the Bible into English, rejected baptism and confession, and denied the doctrine of transubstantiation.
- Hussites – the 14th century followers of Jan Hus. They demanded celebration of the Lord's Supper in both kinds (bread and wine to priests and laity alike).

=== Inquisition ===
At the beginning of the 13th century, the Catholic Church instituted the papal or monastic Inquisition which began as an extension and more rigorous enforcement of pre-existing episcopal powers (possessed, but little used, by bishops in the early Middle Ages) to inquire about and suppress heresy, but later became the domain of selected Dominicans and Franciscans under the direct power of the Pope. The use of torture to extract confessions was authorized by Innocent IV in 1252.

Giordano Bruno, was executed by the Church for heretical beliefs in 1600. A believer in Copernicanism (the idea that the earth and other planets orbited the sun), he is perhaps most famous for his preaching that the universe was unlimited with innumerable inhabited worlds; but also professed heretical ideas about eternal damnation, the Trinity, the deity of Christ, the virginity of Mary, and transubstantiation, pantheism, and metempsychosis regarding the reincarnation of the soul. Historians disagree over whether his heresy trial was mainly a response to his cosmological views, or his views on religion and afterlife.

== Reformation and Modern Era (1520–present) ==
In the 16th century several preachers/scholars (Martin Luther, John Calvin, and others) attempted to reform the Catholic Church, disagreeing with church doctrine on the nature of salvation, the sale of indulgences, etc. This movement developed into the Protestant Reformation and a major schism in Christianity. Unlike many other heresies, Protestantism was not eliminated by the Catholic church and as of 2010 is estimated to comprise 37% of all Christians.

=== Modern Roman Catholic response to Protestantism ===
At the Council of Trent (1545–1563) Catholic leaders declared all forms of Protestantism heretical. Some of the doctrines of Protestantism that the Catholic Church considers heretical are the belief that the Bible is the only supremely authoritative source and rule of faith and practice in Christianity (sola scriptura), that only by faith alone can anyone ever accept the grace of salvation and not by following God's commandments (sola fide), and that Christian priesthood should be a universal priesthood of all believers.

Among the positions in violation of the views of the Catholic Church that Martin Luther had taken when he was a Catholic priest were, "Haereticos comburi est contra voluntatem Spiritus" (It is contrary to the Spirit to burn heretics). This phrase was the name given to summarized version of his comments that were included in Exsurge Domine, a 1520 papal bull that listed his anti-heretic killing sympathies along with 40 other positions Luther had taken in his writings that were allegedly heretical, and which he was ordered to recant. When Luther failed to accept the bull and give a broad recantation of his writings, he was excommunicated in the subsequent 1521 papal bull Decet Romanum Pontificem.

In the 17th century, Jansenism, which taught the doctrine of predestination, was regarded by the Catholic Church as a heresy; the Jesuits were particularly strong opponents of Jansenism. The text Augustinus, which propagated Jansenist beliefs, was repudiated by the Holy See.

In Testem benevolentiae nostrae, issued on 22 January 1899, Pope Leo XIII condemned as heresy, Americanism, "the rejection of external spiritual direction as no longer necessary, the extolling of natural over supernatural virtues, the preference of active over passive virtues, the rejection of religious vows as not compatible with Christian liberty, and the adoption of a new method of apologetics and approach to non-Catholics." Cardinal James Gibbons responded to Pope Leo XIII that no educated Catholic Christian in the United States subscribed to these condemned doctrines.

==== Last execution of a heretic ====
The last case of an execution by the inquisition was that of the schoolmaster Cayetano Ripoll, accused of deism by the waning Spanish Inquisition and hanged on 26 July 1826 in Valencia after a two-year trial.

=== Protestant responses to heresy of other Protestants ===
For some years after the Protestant Reformation, Protestant denominations were also known to execute those whom they considered heretics. Protestantism is divided into various denominations on the basis of theology and ecclesiology, including Adventists, Anabaptists, Anglicans/Episcopalians, Baptists, Calvinist/Reformed, (Note: This branch was first called Calvinism by Lutherans who opposed it, but many find the word Reformed to be more descriptive. It includes Presbyterianism, Congregationalism, many of united and uniting churches, as well as historic Continental Reformed churches in France, Switzerland, the Netherlands, Germany, Hungary, and elsewhere.) Lutherans, Methodists, Moravians, Pentecostals, Plymouth Brethren, Presbyterians, Quakers and Waldensians. some of whom have had serious disagreements historically.

Martin Luther and Philip Melanchthon, who played an instrumental part in the formation of the Lutheran churches condemned Johannes Agricola and his doctrine of antinomianism—the belief that Christians were free from the moral law contained in the Ten Commandments—as a heresy. Traditional Lutheranism, espoused by Luther himself, teaches that after justification, "the Law of God continued to guide people in how they were to live before God".

The Thirty-nine Articles of the Anglican Communion and the Twenty-five Articles of the Methodist churches condemn Pelagianism.

John Wesley, the founder of the Methodist tradition, harshly criticized antinomianism, considering it the "worst of all heresies". He taught that Christian believers are bound to follow the moral law for their sanctification. Methodist Christians thus teach the necessity of following the moral law as contained in the Ten Commandments, citing Jesus' teaching, "If ye love me, keep my commandments" (cf. Saint John 14:15). Luther advocated the death penalty for Anabaptists in 1530, 1531, and 1536.

==== Bloodshed ====
Protestant Christians did not have Ecumenical Councils, Inquisitions or some of the other institutions for establishing orthodoxy and preventing deviation from it, but were known to kill individuals for heresy and related matters during the Reformation and Counter reformation. As mentioned above Martin Luther opposed the burning of heretics. However he did not oppose the execution of members of at least one radical Protestant sect—Anabaptist—and advocated the death penalty for them in 1530, 1531, and 1536. One of the results of the Diet of Speyer (1529) was an agreement between attending Catholics and Lutherans to kill Anabaptists.

In Home Postils 1533, Luther explained the need for civil authorities to execute those who create "scandal" with "false doctrine".

The worldly authorities bear the sword with orders to prevent all scandal so that it may not enter and inflict harm. But the most dangerous and horrible scandal is where false doctrine and worship penetrates ... They (i.e. state officials) must resist it (i.e. scandal) stoutly, and realize that nothing else will avail save their use do the sword and of the full extent of their power in order to preserve the doctrine pure and the worship clean and undefiled.

Protestant leader John Calvin also advocated for the execution of Unitarian Michael Servetus, though he favored beheading rather than his burning. Servetus was killed in 1533.

According to the University of Notre Dame, approximately 300 Catholics were "killed for their faith" in Britain between 1534 and 1681 CE. (300 Protestants were also killed from 1553 to 1558 under the Catholic reign of "Bloody Mary", Mary I.)

== Eastern Orthodox response to Roman Catholicism and Lutheranism ==
Metropolitan Philaret, the Metropolitan of Moscow and Kolomna (and posthumously canonized as a saint) rejected the status of heretic for Evangelical Lutherans and Roman Catholics.

== See also ==
- Heresy in the Catholic Church
- Infallibility of the Church
- List of heresies in the Catholic Church
- Esoteric Christianity
- List of people burned as heretics
- Pelagius
- Word of Faith
