= Josephines =

1184 Christian heretics

The Josephines (Latin Josephini or Josepini) were Christian heretics condemned by Pope Lucius III's decree Ad abolendam in 1184 with the support of the Emperor Frederick I. They were "subject to a perpetual anathema" along with the Cathars and Patarenes, Humiliati, Poor Men of Lyon, Passagians and Arnaldists.

Almost nothing is known about the Josephines. They are mentioned, again alongside the Passagians, who practised circumcision, in a bull of Pope Gregory IX in 1231 and in charters of Emperor Frederick II in 1239. From this, Robert Eisler concludes that they were Judaizers. He connects them to a seventh-century Paulician sect claiming descent from Josephus Epaphroditus, already recognised as a spurious figure by Peter of Sicily and Pseudo-Photius in the ninth century. He represents a conflation of Flavius Josephus and the freedman Epaphroditus. For Eisler, such ideas were transmitted by the Slavonic Josephus, which he accepted as authentic. He thus traced the western Josephines, whom he placed in Lombardy and Provence, to the Paulicians resettled in Europe in the eighth century.

The Josephines are sometimes identified with the Josephists (Josephistae) mentioned by a 13th-century German writer. The latter are accused of practising only spiritual marriage and condemning sexual activity, in which case they probably took their name from Saint Joseph, who, on the Catholic view of the perpetual virginity of Mary, did not consummate his marriage. Ilarino da Milano, however, rejected the identification of the two sects as baseless.

== Bibliography ==
- Eisler, Robert (1931). The Messiah Jesus and John the Baptist: According to Flavius Josephus' Recently Rediscovered 'Capture of Jerusalem' and the Other Jewish and Christian Sources. Dial Press.
- Hamilton, Bernard (2004). "Introduction". In Hamilton, Janet (ed.). Hugh Eteriano: Contra Patarenos. Brill. pp. 1–102. ISBN 9789004140004.
- Lambert, Malcolm (2002). Medieval Heresy: Popular Movements from the Gregorian Reform to the Reformation (3rd ed.). Wiley-Blackwell.
- Milano, Ilarino da (1983). Eresie medioevali: Scritti minori. Rimini.
