= Ad abolendam =

1184 papal bull and decretal on abolishing heresy by Pope Lucius III

Ad abolendam (lit. 'On abolition / Towards abolishing'; full title in Latin: Ad abolendam diversam haeresium pravitatem, lit. 'To abolish diverse malignant heresies') was a decretal and bull of Pope Lucius III, written at Verona and issued 4 November 1184. It was issued after the Council of Verona settled some jurisdictional differences between the Papacy and Frederick I, Holy Roman Emperor. The document prescribes measures to uproot heresy and sparked the efforts which culminated in the Albigensian Crusade and the Inquisitions to attain the complete abolition of heresy.

== Historical origins ==
The historical context for the issuing of Ad abolendam was papal reassertion of its authority in Europe following the Investiture Dispute with the Emperor, and its discovery of what has been called a 'legislative' means of doing so. The Third Lateran Council of 1179 had already resolved to prevent schisms of the kind that the Investiture Dispute had created, and decretals such as Ad abolendam were intended to enforce this; Fisher has suggested that it was no coincidence that the decree followed the Peace of Constance of the previous year, at which the Emperor was in effect compelled to acknowledge defeat.

== Heretics ==
The list of proscribed heretical sects was originally decreed at the Third Lateran Council (March 1179), and was retained and expanded at Verona in 1184. Pope Lucius condemned all heretical sects and persons who preached without the authorisation of the Roman Church, whether publicly or privately, and placed them under excommunication. Among the particular sects mentioned in Ad abolendam were the Cathars, Humiliati, Waldensians, Arnoldists, and Josephines. More important than the direct attack on heresy, however, was the stipulation of equal measures for those who supported heretics, overtly or indirectly, and modern historians have noted that, these groups being primarily based around Lombardy and the Languedoc, Papal motivation in condemning them was probably as politically motivated as it was theological.

All associated with heresy would be placed under excommunication but the heretics themselves were an ill-defined grouping, some of which hardly existed by 1184 and others who had never been previously established as heretics. The Cathars and the anti-authority Milanese group of the 1130s, the Arnoldists, were ascertained as heretics. Of the others, the Patarenes were originally reformers (albeit against the so-called Papal Monarchy); the Humiliati, ‘their only error was apparently failing to observe the prescription of lay preaching rather than the teaching of false doctrines;’ The Poor of Lyon -- the Waldensians -- have been compared to the Cistercians as merely searching for the vita apostolica; of the Passagines, nothing is known, and the Josephines are not even associated with any doctrine at all.

== Penalty ==
Those accused of heresy, if they could not prove their innocence or forswear their errors, or if they backslid into error subsequently, were to be handed over to the lay authorities to receive their animadversio debita ("due penalty"). All those who supported heresy were deprived of many rights: the right to hold public office, the right to trial, the right to draft a will, and the hereditability of their fiefs and offices.

For the enforcement of the measures demanded by the decretal, Lucius obligated all patriarchs, archbishops, and bishops to re-announce the excommunication on certain feasts and holidays. Those who did not observe this for three years consecutively would be deprived of their ecclesiastical offices. The bishops were furthermore obligated to "seek out" heretics. They were to make bi- or triannual rounds of their dioceses, visiting suspicious locations and questioning the people about the existence of heresy. The people would be required to swear under oath (compurgation) anything they knew about heretical activity. All oath-breakers were to be treated as heretics.

== Canon 3 ==
The bull was incorporated as Canon 3 of the Fourth Council of the Lateran of 1215 under Pope Innocent III. Contrary to what is often said, Lucius did not institute the Inquisition, which was not created until the reign of Pope Gregory IX in 1234.

== Bibliography ==
- Peters, Edward (1980). Heresy and authority in medieval Europe:Documents in translation. University of Pennsylvania Press. ISBN 0-8122-1103-0.
