= Josephites =

Josephites may refer to one of the following:

- Josephites of Belgium, a Roman Catholic religious congregation
- Saint Joseph's Missionary Society of Mill Hill, a Roman Catholic religious society of apostolic life, headquartered outside London
- Society of St. Joseph of the Sacred Heart, a Catholic religious society of apostolic life, headquartered in Baltimore who minister to African-Americans (originally a part of the above Mill Hill Fathers)
- Sisters of St Joseph of the Sacred Heart, a Catholic religious order founded in Australia
- Josephite (Latter Day Saints), any adherent tracing the Restorationist priesthood through Joseph Smith III
- Josephites, followers of Joseph Volotsky, Russian monk who advocated the church's ownership of land, social activity and charity
- Josephites, members of the Josephite movement, a 20th-century movement in the Russian Orthodox Church
- Josephites, members of the Congregation of Sisters of St Joseph of the Sacred Heart
- Josephites, students and alumni of St. Joseph Higher Secondary School, Dhaka
- Josephites, students and alumni of St Joseph's College, Allahabad
- Josephites, students and alumni of St Joseph's Boys' High School, Bangalore
- Josephites, students and alumni of St. Joseph's College, Bangalore

== See also ==
- Josephite marriage
- Josephines
- Josephinism, whose adherents are called Josephists
