= Synod of Verona =

The Synod of Verona was held November 1184 under the auspices of Pope Lucius III and the Holy Roman Emperor Frederick I.

The meeting was to address numerous issues. Some of these were the dispute over claims between empire and papacy in central Italy, the proprietary concerns of the bishopric of Gurk, plans for a crusade to the Holy Land, a dispute over the investiture of the rival Archbishops of Trier, Folmar of Karden (the pro-papal candidate) and Rudolf of Wied (afterward invested as anti-archbishop by Barbarossa under the terms of the Concordat of Worms), and the condemnation of heresy. It also addressed the issue of marriage, particularly in response to the condemnation of marriage by the Cathars, finally listing it as a sacrament.

Though Lucius and Frederick were able to agree on Gurk, a new crusade and heresy issues, the remaining issues were left unsettled.

The most significant event of the synod was the declaration of the papal bull Ad abolendam and the joint condemnation of Arnoldists, Cathars and Patarenes, Humiliati, Josephini, Passagini, and Waldensians as heretics. The Waldensians were charged for being in rebellion since they continued to preach despite being forbidden from doing so. The synod also identified this group as part of the Humiliati or "Poor Men of Lyons" and put them in the same category as the Cathari and Patarenes, anathematizing them in the process. A decree was included that detailed a system of trial and punishment for heretics.
