= Viboldone Abbey =

13th-century Italian abbey

Coordinates: 45°23′10″N 9°16′38″E

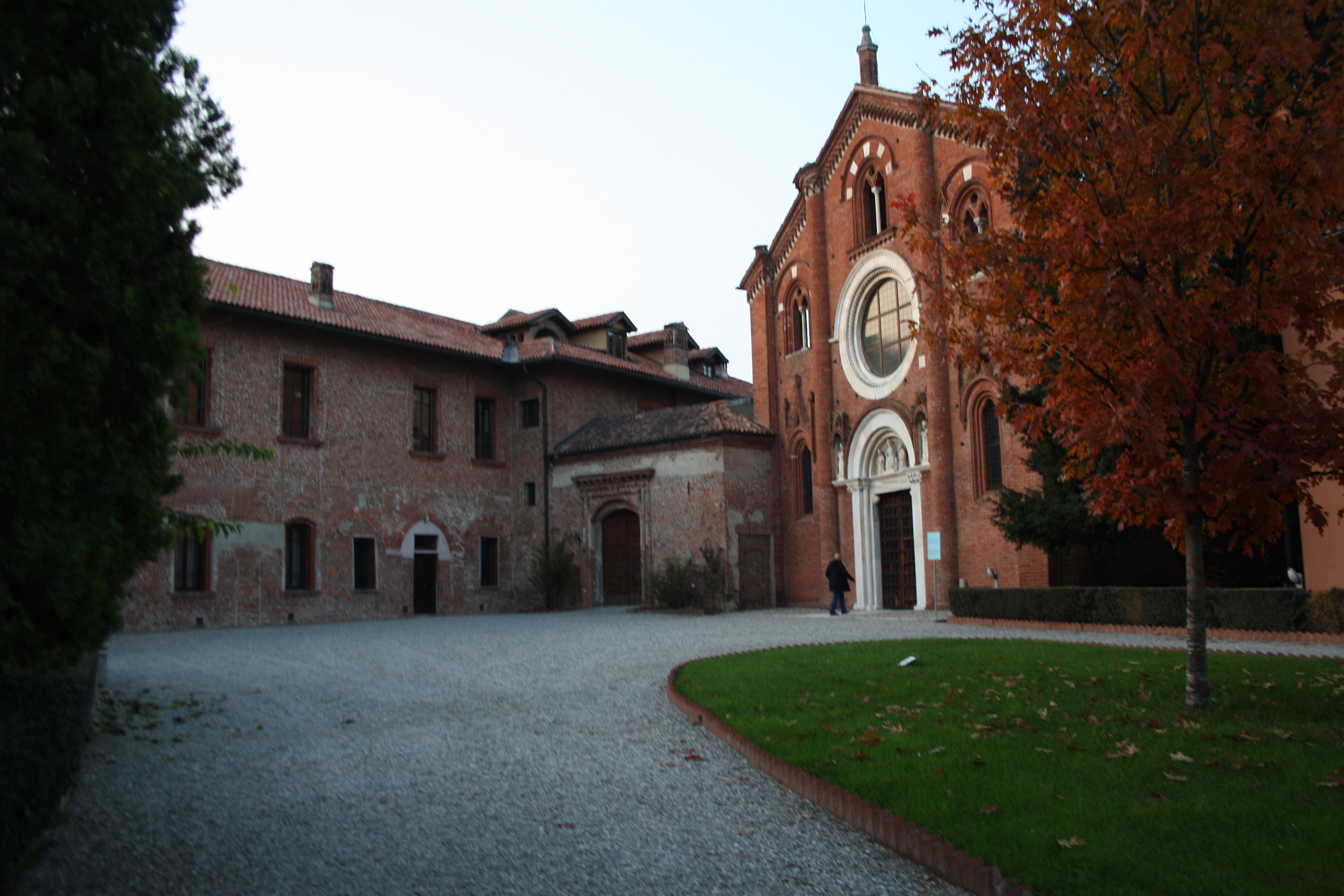
Entrance to the abbey

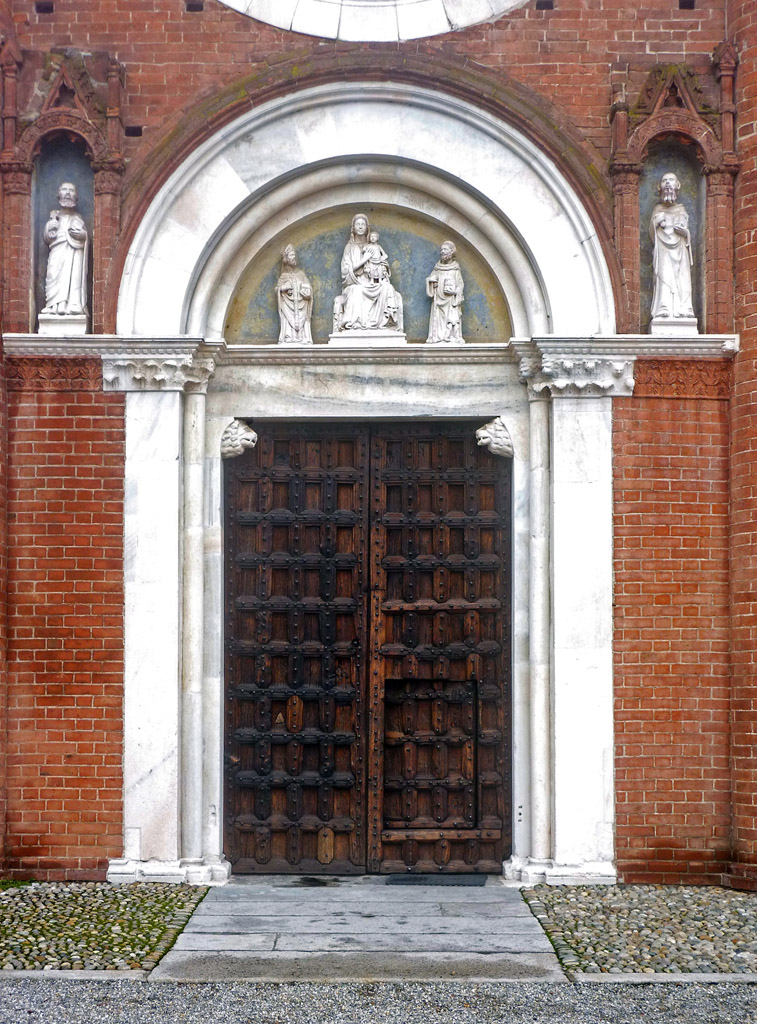
Entrance portal

The Abbey of Viboldone is an abbey in Viboldone, a frazione of San Giuliano Milanese, in the province of Milan, northern Italy.

== History ==
The abbey was founded in 1176 and completed in 1348 by the Humiliati, an order of monks, nuns, and laypeople who worked in the abbey, producing wool cloth and cultivating the nearby fields with innovative techniques.

After the suppression of the Humiliati by Pope Pius V (1571), the abbey went to the Olivetan Benedictines, who were forced to leave the abbey in 1773, when Lombardy fell into Austrian hands.

After several years of abandonment, the abbey has been home to the Community of Madre Margherita Marchi (Benedictine nuns) since 1941.

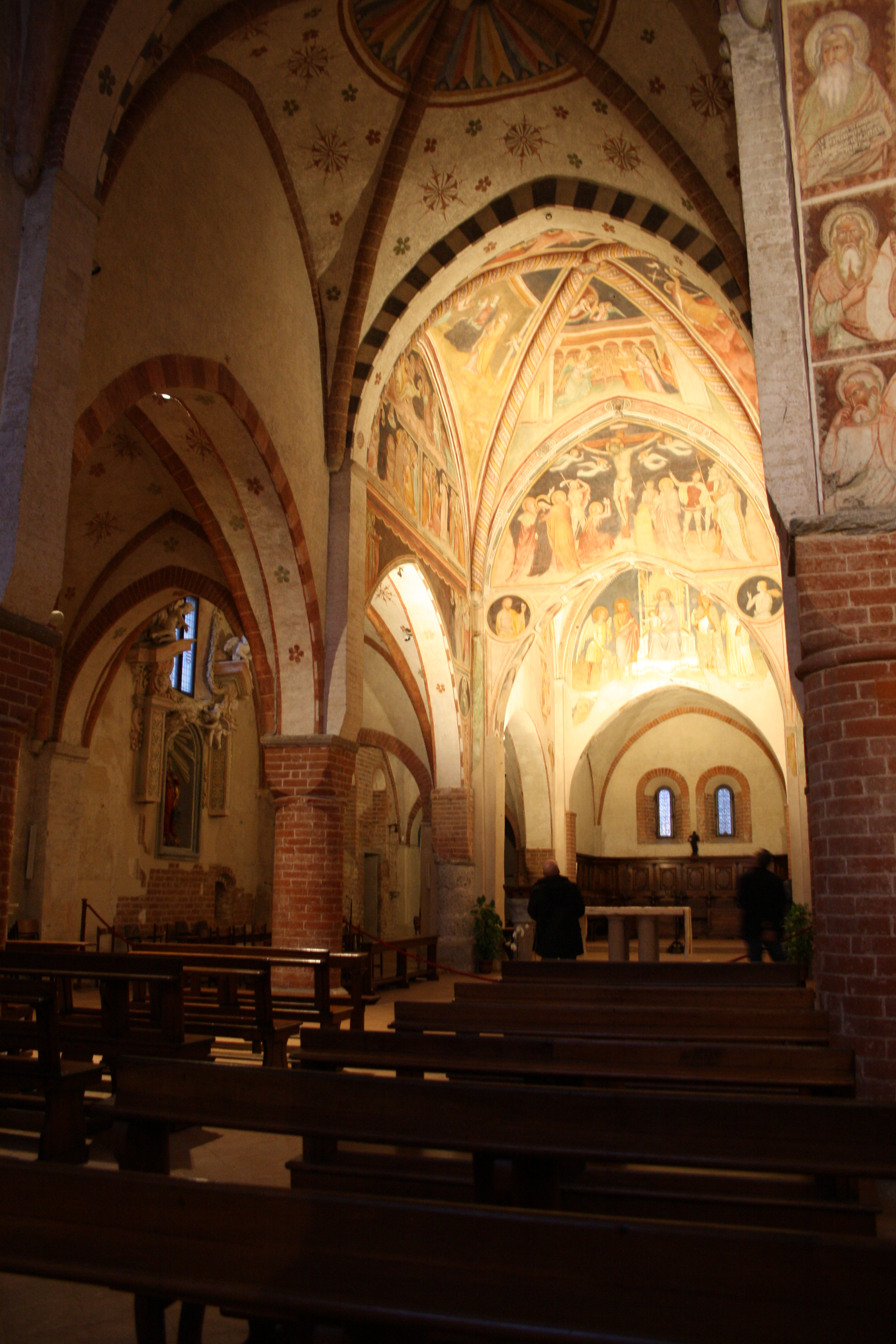
View of the interior

== Architecture ==
The façade (finished in 1348) is hut-shaped, with mullioned windows and visible brickwork with white-stone decorations, and is divided into three sectors by two semi-columns. The entrance portal is in white marble and is surmounted by a lunette with marble sculptures of the "Madonna with Child between the Saints Ambrose and John of Meda". On either side, two Gothic niches house statues of the Sts. Peter and Paul. The door is in dark wood and dates to the 14th century.

The bell tower has an appearance similar to that of the façade, with frames in cotto and small arcades at the bases of the double- and triple-mullioned windows. Small circular windows surmount the latter.

The interior is rather sober, with few decorations aside from the extensive frescoes of the Giottesque school. It has a rectangular hall plan, with a nave and two aisles, each with five spans (the first in Romanesque style, while the remaining ones are Gothic, with cotto columns and high cross vaults). The arches are ogival.

The fresco decoration includes the Madonna in Maestà with Saints and the large Universal Judgement with, in the middle, Jesus and, at his left, the Damned, overseen by Satan. Other frescoes, depicting Renaissance musical instruments, are housed in the Music Hall, located in a building annexed to the church.
