= John of Meda =

Italian Roman Catholic saint

Saint John of Meda Ord.Hum
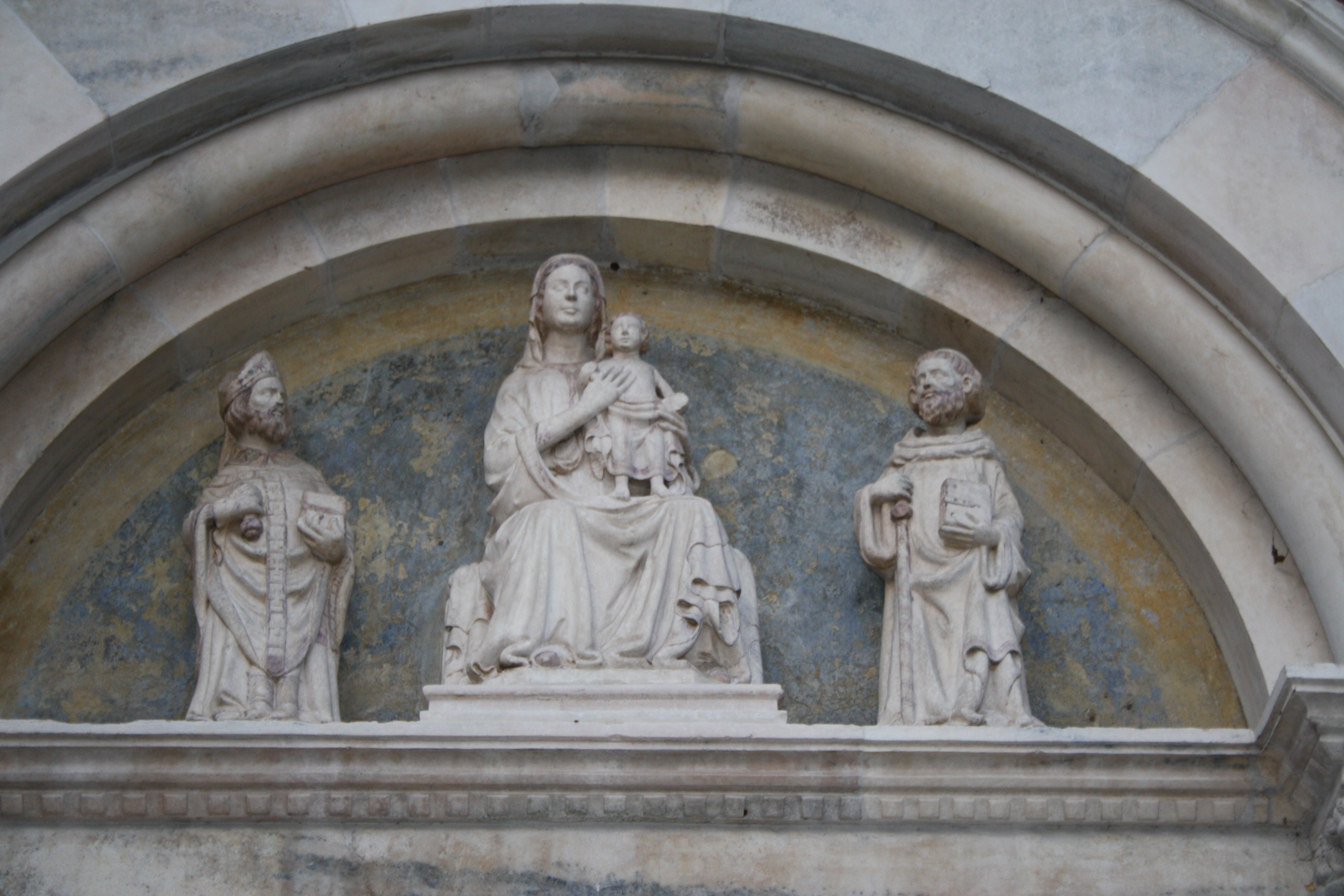
- Lunette of the portal of the church of the Abbey of Viboldone, Milan, Italy. On the left is Saint Ambrose (patron saint of Milan), with Our Lady with the Child Jesus in the centre, and St. John of Meda on the right.

Abbot
- Born: Giovanni Oldrati (or Oldradi); 1100; Meda, Lombardy, Holy Roman Empire
- Died: 26 September 1159 (aged 58-59); Brera, Lombardy, Holy Roman Empire
- Venerated in: Roman Catholic Church (Lombardy)
- Canonized: ca. 1170 by Pope Alexander III
- Major shrine: Pontificio Collegio Gallio, Como, Italy
- Feast: 26 September

John of Meda, Ord.Hum., (1100 – 26 September 1159) also known as John of Como, was an Italian monk of the Humiliati Order and abbot at their monasteries at Milan and Como. He has been declared a saint by the Roman Catholic Church.

== Life ==
He was born Giovanni Oldrati (or Oldradi) in the town of Meda, Lombardy. Receiving a vision of the Virgin Mary, in 1134, he felt called to join the Humiliati at their Abbey of Viboldone. This was a religious movement widely viewed with suspicion as heretical because its communities consisted of families and men and women following the monastic form of life, with the former serving as the community leaders.

John came to work for their adoption of the Benedictine Rule, adapted to their needs. Later, John went on to found other monasteries of the Order in the regions of Milan and Lombardy. He spent his later life serving as an abbot, and is known for introducing the Little Office of Our Lady.
