= Bonacursus =

Bonacursus was a 12th-century Italian Cathar who converted to Catholicism and released a confessional report to the people of Milan exposing the nature of the Cathar heresy entitled "Manifestatio haeresis catharorum quam fecit Bonacursus" sometime between 1176 and 1190. He also reported on the Pasagian heresy as well as the Arnoldists.
