= Arnold of Brescia =

Italian Christian preacher (c. 1090–1155)

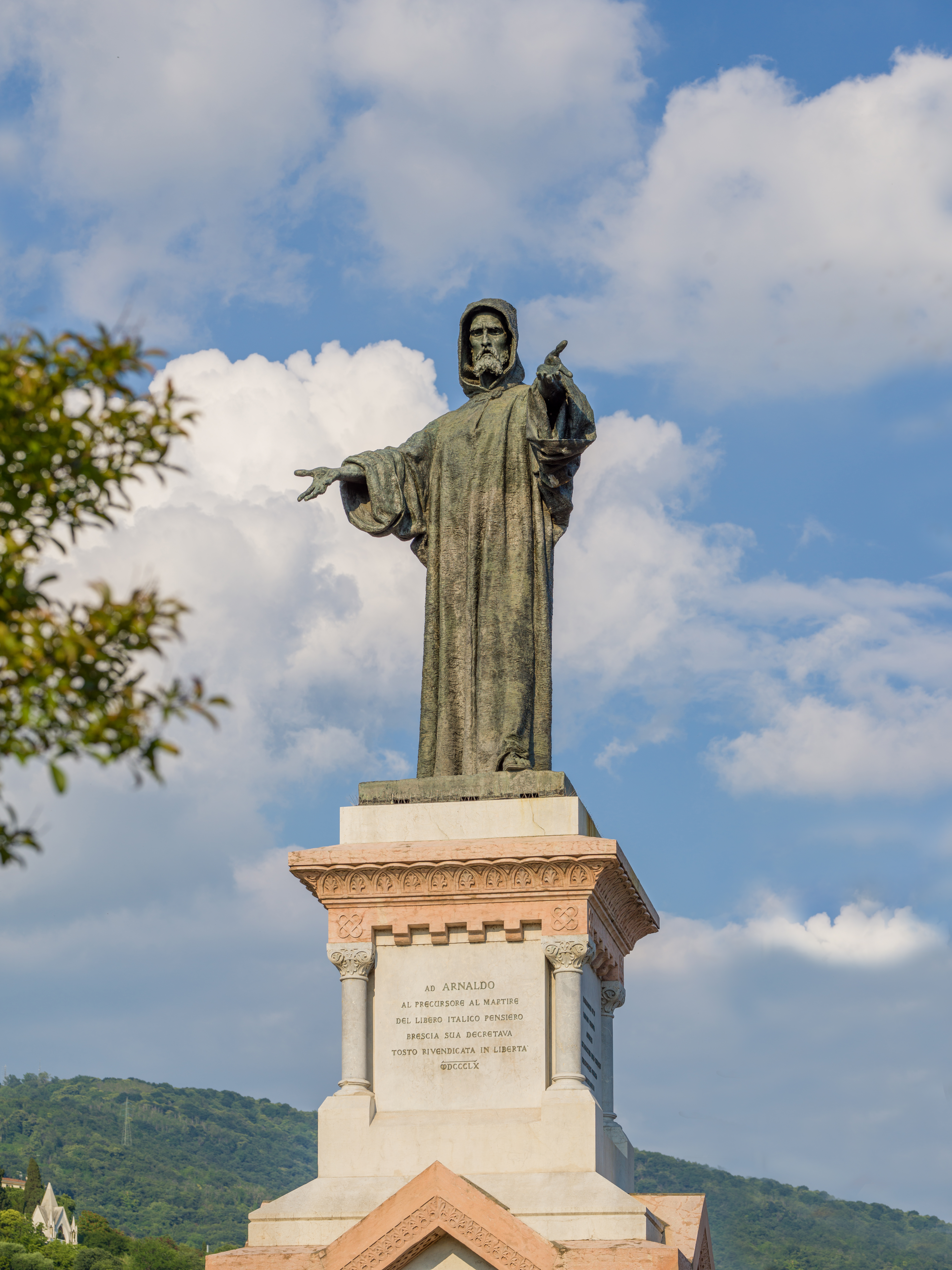
- Monument to Arnold of Brescia in Brescia, Italy (1882).
- Born: c. 1090; Brescia, Lombardy, Imperial Italy
- Died: June 1155 (aged 64–65); Rome, Papal States
- Cause of death: Execution by hanging
- Occupation: Canon regular
- Movement: Proto-Protestantism

Arnold of Brescia (c. 1090 – June 1155), also known as Arnaldus (Italian: Arnaldo da Brescia), was an Italian canon regular from Lombardy, who called on the Church to renounce property-ownership and participated in the Commune of Rome of 1144–1193. He is considered a Proto-Reformer and precursor of the Protestant Reformation.

Exiled at least three times and eventually arrested, Arnold was hanged by the papacy; his remains were burned posthumously and the ashes thrown into the River Tiber. Though he failed as a religious reformer and a political leader, his teachings on apostolic poverty gained currency after his death among "Arnoldists" and more widely among Waldensians and the Spiritual Franciscans, though no written word of his has survived the official condemnation. Protestants rank him among the precursors of the Protestant Reformation.

== Biography ==
Born in Brescia, Arnold became an Augustinian canon and then prior of a monastery in Brescia. He criticized the Catholic Church's temporal powers that involved it in a land struggle in Brescia against the Count-Bishop of Brescia. He called on the Church to renounce its claim and return ownership to the city government so as not to be tainted by possession—renunciation of worldliness being one of his primary teachings. He was condemned at the Second Lateran Council in 1139 and banished from Italy.

According to the chronicler Otto of Freising, Arnold had studied in Paris under the tutelage of the reformer and philosopher Pierre Abélard. He approved of Abélard's proposals for monastic reform. He was also influenced by the French reformer Henry of Lausanne. He agreed with the several issues they preached, including the issues of Infant Baptism, and the great wealth of the Roman Church among other things.". The issue came before the Synod of Sens in 1141 and both Arnold and Abélard's positions were overruled by Bernard of Clairvaux. Arnold stood alone against the church's decision after Abélard's capitulation; he returned to Paris, where he continued to teach and preach against Bernard. As a consequence he was then commanded to silence and exiled by Pope Innocent II. He took refuge first in Zürich and then probably in Bavaria. His writings were also ordered burned as a further measure, though that judgement is the only evidence that he had actually written anything. Arnold continued to preach his radical ideas concerning apostolic poverty.

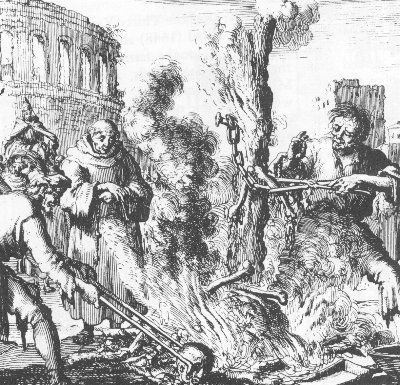
Arnold of Brescia's corpse burned at the stake by the Papal guards; a much later print from Martyrs Mirror.

Arnold, who is known only from the vituperative condemnation of his foes, was declared to be a demagogue; his motives were impugned.

Having returned to Italy after 1143, in 1145 Arnold made his peace with Pope Eugene III, who ordered him to submit himself to the mercy of the Church in Rome. When he arrived, he found that Giordano Pierleoni's followers had asserted the ancient rights of the commune of Rome, taken control of the city from papal forces, and founded a republic, the Commune of Rome. Arnold sided with the people immediately and, after Pierleoni's deposition, soon became the intellectual leader of the Commune, calling for freedoms and democratic rights. Arnold taught that clergy who owned property had no power to perform the Sacraments. He succeeded in driving Pope Eugene into exile in 1146, for which he was excommunicated on 15 July 1148. When Pope Eugene returned to the city in 1148, Arnold continued to lead the blossoming republic despite his excommunication. In summing up these events, Caesar Baronius called Arnold "the father of political heresies", while Edward Gibbon later expressed his view that "the trumpet of Roman liberty was first sounded by Arnold."

After Pope Eugene's death, Pope Adrian IV swiftly took steps to regain control of Rome. He allied with Frederick Barbarossa, who took Rome by force in 1155 after a Holy Week interdict and forced Arnold again into exile. Arnold was seized by Imperial forces and tried by the Roman Curia as a rebel. Importantly, he was never accused of heresy. Faced with the stake, he refused to recant any of his positions. Convicted of rebellion, Arnold was hanged in June and his body burnt. Because he remained a hero to large sections of the Roman people and the minor clergy, his ashes were cast into the Tiber, to prevent his burial place becoming venerated as the shrine of a martyr.

In 1882, after the collapse of Papal temporal powers, the city of Brescia erected a monument to its native son.

== Beliefs ==
Arnold attacked the powers of the Roman Church, and he had a radical zeal to have moral reform in the clergy. Arnold rejected a theocratical state and instead believed that the church and state need to be in complete separation. Arnold believed in "apostolic poverty" and that the church needed to be restored to apostolic purity. The Second Lateran Council condemned the Arnoldists for denying infant baptism.

Arnold rejected the power of the Roman church and believed that sinful clergy lost their right of administering the sacraments.

Some of his critics attacked Arnold for having "offensive views on baptism and the Eucharist".

== See also ==
- History of Rome in the Middle Ages
- Waldensians
- Donatists
