= Arnoldists =

Medieval Christian sect

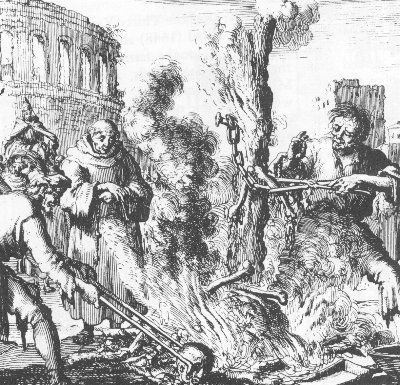
Remains of Arnold of Brescia burned at the stake at the hands of the Papal guards

Arnoldists were a Christian sect in the 12th century, named after Arnold of Brescia, an advocate of ecclesiastical reform who criticized the great wealth and possessions of the Roman Catholic Church, while preaching against infant baptism and transubstantiation.

The Arnoldists were condemned as heretics by Pope Lucius III in Ad abolendam during the Synod of Verona in 1184.

Arnoldists' tenets would later be addressed by Bonacursus of Milan, c. 1190, in his Manifestatio haeresis Catharorum, which refuted Arnoldist apostolic poverty and the incapacity of sinful priests to administer the sacraments.

== See also ==
- Apostolic poverty
- Donatism
- Lollardy
- Temporal power of the Roman papacy
- Waldensians

== Sources ==
- Lambert, Malcolm (1977). Medieval Heresy: Popular Movements from Bogomil to Hus. Edward Arnold Publishers Ltd.
- Russell, Jeffrey Burton (1992). Dissent and Order in the Middle Ages: The Search for Legitimate Authority. Wipf & Stock publishers.
