= Humiliati =

Italian religious order of men

The Humiliati (Italian Umiliati) were an Italian religious order of men formed probably in the 12th century. It was suppressed by a papal bull in 1571 though an associated order of women continued into the 20th century.

== Origin ==
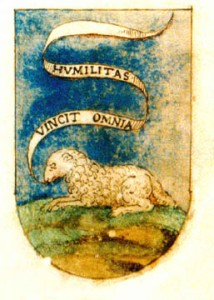
Coat of Arms of the Humiliati Order

The origin of the order of Humiliati is obscure.

John of Meda (c. 1100-September 26, 1159) has been claimed to have founded the first Humiliati monastery near Como, although this is not known to have been asserted before the 15th century. John of Meda's existence is not disputed.

According to some chroniclers, certain noblemen of Lombardy, taken prisoner by the Emperor Henry V (1081–1125) following a rebellion in the area, were taken as captives to Germany and after suffering the miseries of exile for some time, they assumed a penitential garb of grey and gave themselves up to works of charity and mortification, whereupon the emperor, after receiving their pledges of future loyalty, permitted their return to Lombardy.

At this time they were often called "Barettini", from their beret-shaped headdress. Their acquaintance with the German woollen manufacturers enabled them to introduce improved methods into Italy, thus giving a great impetus to the industry, supplying the poor with employment and distributing their gains among those in want.

Returning to their own country, the Humiliati had contact with St Bernard. On his advice, in 1134, many of them, with the consent of their wives, withdrew into a monastery founded in Milan. Despite Bernard's best attempts, at first, the Humiliati had no fixed rule. Their name "Humiliati" is said to have arisen from their very simple clothes, which were all of one colour against the fashions of the day. Around 1180, the anonymous author of the Chronicon universale of Laon thus describes them:

At that time there were certain citizens of Lombard towns who lived at home with their families, chose a distinctive form of religious life, refrained from lies, oaths and lawsuits, were satisfied with plain clothing, and argued for the Catholic faith. They approached the pope and besought him to confirm their way of life. This the pope granted them, provided that they did all things humbly and decently, but he expressly forbade them to hold private meetings or to presume to preach in public. However, spurning the papal command, they became disobedient, for which they suffered excommunication. They called themselves Humiliati because they did not use coloured cloth for clothing, but restricted themselves to plain dress.

The fraternity spread rapidly and gave rise to two new branches, a "second order" composed of women, and a "third order" composed of priests. The order of priests, once formed, claimed precedence over the other branches, and on the model of mendicant orders such as the Dominicans or the Franciscans, was styled the "first order". Their original ashen habit was replaced by a white one.

== Consolidation ==
Some years later, on the advice of St. John of Meda (died in 1159), they embraced the Rule of St. Benedict as adapted by him to their needs. Details relating to this reform are ill-authenticated, the Acta of John of Meda (Acta sanctorum, Sept., vii. 320) being almost entirely unsupported by contemporary evidence.

The "Chronicon anonymi Laudunensis Canonici" (Monumenta Germaniae Historica, Scriptores, xxvi, 449), states that in 1178 a group of Lombards came to Rome with the intention of obtaining the Pope's approval of the rule of life which they had spontaneously chosen; while continuing to live in their houses in the midst of their families, they wished to lead a more pious existence, abandon oaths and litigation, be content with modest dress, and live in a spirit of piety. The Pope approved their resolve to live in humility and purity, but forbade them to hold gatherings or preach in public. The chronicler added that they disobeyed and thus were excommunicated.

The Chronicon Urspergense (Monumenta Germaniae Historica, Scriptores, xxiii, 376–377) mentions the Humiliati as one of the two Waldensian sects and a decretal promulgated in 1184 by Pope Lucius III at the Council of Verona against all heretics condemns both the "Poor Men of Lyons" and "those who attribute to themselves falsely the name of Humiliati". Though orthodox, the Order of the Humiliati was always tainted by a certain suspicion.

In this state they remained until 1201, when, upon presentation of their constitution, Pope Innocent III reconciled them with the Church, and reorganized them in conformity with their economic and religious customs, also approving of the name "Humiliati". This brought most of them back to the Church, but a number persevered in their former life under the direction of the Poor of Lyons (Waldensians). Economic and religious difficulties, however, aggravated long-felt dissensions between the two groups, and in 1205 these non-reconciled Humiliati separated from the Lyonese Waldensians and formed a distinct group named the "Poor Lombards" ("Pauperes Lombardi").

Pope Innocent III granted a rule to the lay branch as a "third order" that resembled the Regula de poenitentia of the Franciscan movement. The Humiliati rule forbade vain oaths and the taking of God's name in vain, allowed voluntary poverty and marriage, regulated pious exercises, and approved the solidarity which already existed among the members. Unusual was the authorization to meet on Sundays to hear the words of a brother "of proved faith and prudent piety", on condition that they did not discuss among themselves either the Articles of Faith or the Sacraments. Though some Waldensians were perhaps won back in Lombardy, others were not.

The Order grew rapidly, and many of its members were declared Saints and Beati. It also formed trade associations among and played an important part in the civic life of every community in which it was established. It left some fine church buildings still in use.

== Decline and suppression ==
However, in time the accumulation of material possessions and the limitations placed on the number of members admitted (at one time there were only circa 170 in the 94 monasteries) led to laxity and serious abuses.

Charles Borromeo, the Archbishop of Milan, was commissioned by Pope Pius V to remedy the situation. The rigor with which he did this roused such opposition among a minority that a conspiracy formed and one of the Humiliati, Girolamo Donati, called "Farina", attempted to murder Charles. This led to the execution of the principal conspirators by the civil authorities and the suppression of the Order for profligacy by a bull of Pius V of 8 February 1571. Their houses and possessions were bestowed on other religious orders, including the Barnabites and Jesuits, or applied to charity.

== Women's branch ==
The wives of the first Humiliati, who belonged to some of the principal families of Milan, also formed a community under Clara Blassoni, and were joined by so many others that it became necessary to open a second convent, the members of which devoted themselves to the care of the lepers in a neighbouring hospital, whence they were also known as Hospitallers of the Observance.

The number of their monasteries increased rapidly, but the suppression of the male branch of the order, which had administered their temporal affairs, proved a heavy blow, involving in many cases the closing of monasteries, though the congregation itself was not affected by the Bull of suppression. The nuns recited the canonical Hours, fasted rigorously and engaged in other severe penitential practices, such as the "discipline" or self-inflicted whipping. Some retained the ancient Breviary of the order, while other houses adopted the Roman Breviary. The habit consisted of a robe and scapular of white over a tunic of ashen grey, the veils are usually white, though in some houses black. The lay sisters, who retained the name of Barettine, wore grey. In the early 20th century, there were still five independent houses of Humiliati nuns in Italy.

== Notable members ==
- Bonvesin da la Riva
- Luca Manzoli
- Aldobrandesca

== See also ==
- Humiliatenorden
