= Pasagians =

Religious sect

The Pasagians, also spelled Passagians or Pasagini, were a religious sect which appeared in Lombardy in the late 12th or early 13th century and possibly appeared earlier in the East. The Summa contra haereticos, ascribed to Praepositinus of Cremona, describes the Pasagians as retaining the Old Testament rules on circumcision, kosher foods, and the Jewish holy days; in other words, they observed the Law of Moses except in respect to sacrifices, and thus also were given the name Circumcisi.

They likely considered Christ the highest begotten being, and they had a demiurge (δημιουργός Greek for Creator) by whom all other creatures were thought to have been brought into being, citing both the Old and New Testaments in support of their doctrine. However, they were accused of preaching a form of subordinationism, teaching that Christ was a created being and less than the Father.

In the eleventh century, Cardinal Humbert of Silva Candida referred to a sect of Nazarenes, a Sabbath-keeping Christian body existing at that time. Modern scholars believe Humbert was referring here to the Pasagini, which would mean that the sect existed as early as then. The writings of Bonacursus entitled "Against the Heretics" is the chief authority of their history.

The following report is found in a work written by Gregory of Bergamo, about 1250, against the Cathars and Pasaginians:

“After what has been said of the Cathari, there still remains the sect of the Pasagini. They teach Christ to be the first and pure creature; that the Old Testament festivals are to be observed, circumcision, distinction of foods. Moreover, in nearly all other matters, save the sacrifices, the Old Testament is to be observed as literally as the New. Circumcision is to be kept according to the letter. They say that no good person before the advent of Christ descended into the lower regions; and that there is no one in the lower regions and in paradise until now, nor will there be until sentence has been rendered on the day of Judgement.”

As to the origin of the Pasagians, most Church historians suppose them to have come from the East. Neander expresses himself as follows:

“Among the sects of Oriental origin belongs, perhaps besides those already mentioned, the Pasagii or Pasagini.” “The name of this sect reminds one of the word passagium (passage), which signifies a tour, and was very commonly employed to denote pilgrimages to the East. To the holy sepulcher, — crusades. May not this word, then, be regarded as an indication, pointing to the origin of the sect as one that came from the East, intimating that it grew out of dealings with Palestine? May we not suppose that from very ancient times a party of Judaizing Christians had survived, of which this sect must be regarded as an offshoot? The way in which they expressed themselves concerning Christ as being the first-born of creation, would point also, more directly, at the connection of their doctrine with some older Jewish theology, than at that later purely Western origin.”

== See also ==
- Arianism
- Circumcision controversy in early Christianity
- Ebionism
- Judaizers
- Monarchianism
- Sabbatarianism
- Subbotniks
