= Administrative divisions of Saratov Oblast =

Administrative districts of Russian federal subject

Saratov Oblast Russia
- Administrative center: Saratov

Administrative structure (as of 2013)
- Districts: 38
- Cities/towns: 18
- Urban-type settlements: 27
- Selsovets: 618

Municipal structure (as of 2002)
- Rural settlements: 1,752 (inhabited); 55 (uninhabited)

Map of Saratov Oblast (with numbered)

Saratov Oblast is a federal subject of Russia.

== Administrative and municipal divisions ==
Map

- ※ - under the oblast's jurisdiction

Division		Structure		OKATO	OKTMO	Urban-type settlement/ district-level town*	Rural (okrug)
Division		Administrative	Municipal	OKATO	OKTMO	Urban-type settlement/ district-level town*	Rural (okrug)
Svetly (Светлый)		urban-type settlement (ZATO)	urban okrug	63 575	63 775		
Saratov (Саратов)		city	urban okrug	63 401	63 701		
↳	Frunzensky (Фрунзенский)	(under Saratov)	—N/a	63 401	—N/a		
↳	Kirovsky (Кировский)	(under Saratov)	—N/a	63 401	—N/a		
↳	Leninsky (Ленинский)	(under Saratov)	—N/a	63 401	—N/a		
↳	Oktyabrsky (Октябрьский)	(under Saratov)	—N/a	63 401	—N/a		
↳	Volzhsky (Волжский)	(under Saratov)	—N/a	63 401	—N/a		
↳	Zavodskoy (Заводской)	(under Saratov)	—N/a	63 401	—N/a		
Atkarsk (Аткарск)		city	(under Atkarsky)	63 404	63 604		
Balakovo (Балаково)		city	(under Balakovsky)	63 407	63 607		1
Balashov (Балашов)		city	(under Balashovsky)	63 410	63 608		
Volsk (Вольск)		city	(under Volsky)	63 413	63 611		
Krasnoarmeysk (Красноармейск)		city	(under Krasnoarmeysky)	63 418	63 622		
Marks (Маркс)		city	(under Marksovsky)	63 422	63 626		
Petrovsk (Петровск)		city	(under Petrovsky)	63 428	63 635		
Pugachyov (Пугачёв)		city	(under Pugachyovsky)	63 435	63 637		
Rtishchevo (Ртищево)		city	(under Rtishchevsky)	63 440	63 641		
Khvalynsk (Хвалынск)		city	(under Khvalynsky)	63 445	63 649		
Engels (Энгельс)		city	(under Engelssky)	63 450	63 650	Privolzhsky (Приволжский)	1
Shikhany (Шиханы)		city	urban okrug	63 545	63 746		
Mikhaylovsky (Михайловский)		urban-type settlement※	urban okrug	63 000	63 760		
Alexandrovo-Gaysky (Александрово-Гайский)		district		63 202	63 602		8
Arkadaksky (Аркадакский)		district		63 203	63 603	Arkadak (Аркадак) town*	16
Atkarsky (Аткарский)		district		63 204	63 604		20
Bazarno-Karabulaksky (Базарно-Карабулакский)		district		63 206	63 606	Bazarny Karabulak (Базарный Карабулак); Svobodny (Свободный)	21
Balakovsky (Балаковский)		district		63 207	63 607		24
Balashovsky (Балашовский)		district		63 208	63 608	Pinerovka (Пинеровка)	22
Baltaysky (Балтайский)		district		63 209	63 609		9
Volsky (Вольский)		district		63 211	63 611	Cherkasskoye (Черкасское); Sennoy (Сенной)	20
Voskresensky (Воскресенский)		district		63 212	63 612		11
Dergachyovsky (Дергачёвский)		district		63 213	63 613	Dergachi (Дергачи)	17
Dukhovnitsky (Духовницкий)		district		63 214	63 614	Dukhovnitskoye (Духовницкое)	14
Yekaterinovsky (Екатериновский)		district		63 216	63 616	Yekaterinovka (Екатериновка)	19
Yershovsky (Ершовский)		district		63 217	63 617	Yershov (Ершов) town*	26
Ivanteyevsky (Ивантеевский)		district		63 219	63 619		12
Kalininsky (Калининский)		district		63 221	63 621	Kalininsk (Калининск) town*	23
Krasnoarmeysky (Красноармейский)		district		63 222	63 622	Kamensky (Каменский)	17
Krasnokutsky (Краснокутский)		district		63 223	63 623	Krasny Kut (Красный Кут) town*	18
Krasnopartizansky (Краснопартизанский)		district		63 224	63 624	Gorny (Горный)	14
Lysogorsky (Лысогорский)		district		63 225	63 625	Lysye Gory (Лысые Горы)	15
Marksovsky (Марксовский)		district		63 226	63 626		27
Novoburassky (Новобурасский)		district		63 229	63 629	Novye Burasy (Новые Бурасы)	14
Novouzensky (Новоузенский)		district		63 230	63 630	Novouzensk (Новоузенск) town*	11
Ozinsky (Озинский)		district		63 232	63 632	Ozinki (Озинки)	13
Perelyubsky (Перелюбский)		district		63 234	63 634		13
Petrovsky (Петровский)		district		63 235	63 635		21
Pitersky (Питерский)		district		63 236	63 636		13
Pugachyovsky (Пугачёвский)		district		63 237	63 637		22
Rovensky (Ровенский)		district		63 239	63 639	Rovnoye (Ровное)	7
Romanovsky (Романовский)		district		63 240	63 640	Romanovka (Романовка)	10
Rtishchevsky (Ртищевский)		district		63 241	63 641		23
Samoylovsky (Самойловский)		district		63 242	63 642	Samoylovka (Самойловка)	13
Saratovsky (Саратовский)		district		63 243	63 643	Krasny Oktyabr (Красный Октябрь); Krasny Tekstilshchik (Красный Текстильщик); Sokolovy (Соколовый)	15
Sovetsky (Советский)		district		63 244	63 644	Pushkino (Пушкино); Sovetskoye (Советское); Stepnoye (Степное)	6
Tatishchevsky (Татищевский)		district		63 246	63 646	Tatishchevo (Татищево)	19
Turkovsky (Турковский)		district		63 247	63 647	Turki (Турки)	12
Fyodorovsky (Фёдоровский)		district		63 248	63 648	Mokrous (Мокроус)	17
Khvalynsky (Хвалынский)		district		63 249	63 649		14
Engelssky (Энгельсский)		district		63 250	63 650		20
