= Flag of Saratov Oblast =

- Proportion: 2:3
- Adopted: 5 September 1996
- Design: The red bottom and the white stripe with the coat of arms on the center of the white field.

The flag of Saratov Oblast was adopted on 5 September 1996 and was modified on 23 May 2001.

The red bottom is 1/3 of the total height and the white stripe is 2/3 of the total height. In the center of the white field is the coat of arms, a blue shield displaying 3 fish arranged in a "Y" Shape with a golden crown as its helm. The coat of arms is surrounded by branches of golden oak and laurel bound together with golden ribbon. The older flag of Saratov Oblast was practically the same as the current flag, apart from a redesign of the oak laurel, which reduced the amount of shading.

== Other flags ==
Flag	Date	Use	Description
	?–Present	Flag of Saratov city	
	?–Present	Flag of Svetly	
	?–Present	Flag of Atkarsk	
	?–Present	Flag of Balashov	
	?–Present	Flag of Rtishchevo	
	?–Present	Flag of Engels	
	?–Present	Flag of Shikhany	
	?–Present	Flag of Mikhaylovsky	
	?–Present	Flag of Atkarsky District	
	?–Present	Flag of Balakovsky District	
	?–Present	Flag of Balashovsky District	
	?–Present	Flag of Volsky District	
	?–Present	Flag of Dergachyovsky District	
	?–Present	Flag of Dukhovnitsky District	
	?–Present	Flag of Kalininsky District	A blue background with two swans.
	?–Present	Flag of Krasnokutsky District	
	?–Present	Flag of Krasnopartizansky District	
	?–Present	Flag of Marksovsky District	
	?–Present	Flag of Ozinsky District	
	?–Present	Flag of Petrovsky District	
	?–Present	Flag of Pitersky District	
	?–Present	Flag of Romanovsky District	
	?–Present	Flag of Rtishchevsky District	
	?–Present	Flag of Saratovsky District	Flag shows similarities with the Ukrainian SSR.
	?–Present	Flag of Tatishchevsky District	
	?–Present	Flag of Turkovsky District	
	?–Present	Flag of Engelssky District	
