= Krasny Oktyabr, Saratov Oblast =

Krasny Oktyabr Красный Октябрь
- Urban-type settlement
- Interactive map of Krasny Oktyabr
- Location of Krasny Oktyabr Krasny Oktyabr (Saratov Oblast)
- Coordinates: 51.5419°N 45.7104°E
- Country: Russia
- Federal subject: Saratov Oblast
- Administrative district: Saratovsky District
- Founded: 1946

Population (2010 Census)
  - Total: 3,340
  - Estimate (2021): 3,656 (+9.5%)
- Time zone: UTC+4 (MSK+1)
- Postal codes: 410502, 410504
- OKTMO ID: 63643154051

Krasny Oktyabr (Russian: Красный Октябрь) is an urban locality (an urban-type settlement) in Saratovsky District of Saratov Oblast, Russia. Population: 3,340 (2010 census); 3,328 (2002 census); 3,364 (1989 Soviet census).
