= Pinerovka =

Pinerovka Пинеровка
- Urban-type settlement
- Interactive map of Pinerovka
- Location of Pinerovka Pinerovka (Saratov Oblast)
- Coordinates: 51.5631°N 43.0591°E
- Country: Russia
- Federal subject: Saratov Oblast
- Administrative district: Balashovsky District

Population (2010 Census)
  - Total: 3,442
  - Estimate (2021): 3,345 (−2.8%)
- Time zone: UTC+4 (MSK+1)
- Postal code: 412324
- OKTMO ID: 63608154051

Pinerovka (Russian: Пинеровка) is an urban locality (an urban-type settlement) in Balashovsky District of Saratov Oblast, Russia. Population: 3,442 (2010 census); 3,629 (2002 census); 3,669 (1989 Soviet census).
