= Rtishchevsky =

Rtishchevsky (masculine), Rtishchevskaya (feminine), or Rtishchevskoye (neuter) may refer to:

- Rtishchevsky District, a district of Saratov Oblast, Russia
- Rtishchevsky (rural locality), a rural locality (a settlement) in Saratov Oblast, Russia
