= Pushkino, Saratov Oblast =

Pushkino Пушкино
- Urban-type settlement
- Interactive map of Pushkino
- Location of Pushkino Pushkino (Saratov Oblast)
- Coordinates: 51.2346°N 46.9753°E
- Country: Russia
- Federal subject: Saratov Oblast
- Administrative district: Sovetsky District

Population (2010 Census)
  - Total: 2,457
  - Estimate (2021): 2,334 (−5%)
- Time zone: UTC+4 (MSK+1)
- Postal code: 413220
- OKTMO ID: 63644155051

Pushkino (Russian: Пушкино) is an urban locality (an urban-type settlement) in Sovetsky District of Saratov Oblast, Russia. Population: 2,457 (2010 census); 2,748 (2002 census); 2,541 (1989 Soviet census).
