= Bagay-Baranovka air base =

Airport in Saratov Oblast, Russia

Bagay-Baranovka
- Sennoy, Saratov Oblast in Russia
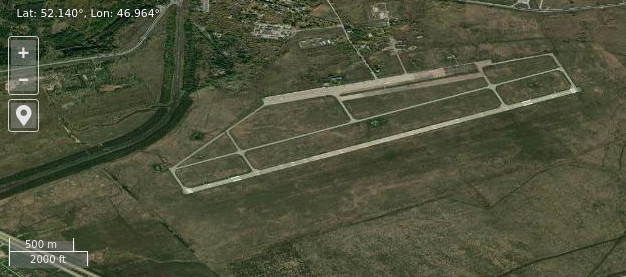
- Satellite imagery of Bagay-Baranovka air base

Site information
- Type: Air Base
- Owner: Ministry of Defence
- Operator: Russian Aerospace Forces

Location
- Shown within Saratov Oblast Bagay-Baranovka (Russia)
- Coordinates: 52°08′25″N 46°57′52″E

Site history
- In use: -present

Airfield information
- Elevation: 38 metres (125 ft) AMSL
Runways
Direction	Length and surface
06/24	2,500 metres (8,202 ft) Concrete

Bagay-Baranovka (also given as Sennoy, Sennoe, or Sennoye) is an air base in Saratov Oblast, Russia located 2 km south of Sennoy. It is a small training base, with training airspace about 5–10 km to the east and home to the 395th Independent Test Aviation Squadron of the 929th State Flight Test Centre named for V. P. Chkalov.

Units on the base include the 343rd Instructor Fighter Aviation Regiment (343 IIAP), equipped with Sukhoi Su-17 aircraft in 1989-91 and Mikoyan-Gurevich MiG-23 and MiG-29E in the early 1990s. The unit has been reported to have disbanded in 1998. However, another report says it had as many as 54 MiG-29s by 2003.

The base also played host briefly to the 176th Fighter Aviation Regiment, flying MiG-29s, when it returned from Mikha Tskhakaya (Senaki), Georgia in 1992; it was quickly disbanded.

== History ==
The airfield was created in the early 1940s and named after the nearby village of Baranivka, located on the banks of the Bagay River. In those years, the 8th Reserve Fighter Aviation Regiment was based at the aerodrome, specializing in personnel training for the units used the Yak fighter aircraft, and also, flying tests with Yak aircraft produced by the Saratov Aviation Plant. Among the units that the regiment successively set up was the 894th Fighter Aviation Regiment.

In 1955, the unit based at the aerodrome (established on March 17, 1944) was reorganized into the 101st Separate test aviation squadron (military unit 54817).

Until 1998, the 343rd instructor fighter air regiment was stationed at the airfield (Su-17, MiG-23, MiG-29 aircraft).

On July 1, 1993, the 395th separate air squadron (395-я отдельная испытательная авиационная эскадрилья (в/ч 54817)) for the radiation, chemical and biological defense was established at the airfield based on merging of the 101st Separate Test Aviation Squadron (101st separate air squadron) and the 220th (separate air squadron) relocated from Aralsk (Kazakhstan).

Since 1993 until 2009, the commander of the 395th separate air squadron was Colonel Plaskeev Grigory Semyonovich, a sniper pilot, Honored military pilot of Russia.

On November 1, 2009, the 395th separate air squadron was transferred to the Air Force of the Russian Federation and reorganized into 929th test aviation squadron of the Main Flight Test Center of V.P. Chkalov.

== See also ==
- List of military airbases in Russia
