= Kamensky, Saratov Oblast =

Kamensky Каменский
- Urban-type settlement
- Interactive map of Kamensky
- Location of Kamensky Kamensky (Saratov Oblast)
- Coordinates: 50.8877°N 45.4910°E
- Country: Russia
- Federal subject: Saratov Oblast
- Administrative district: Krasnoarmeysky District
- Founded: 1765
- Elevation: 187 m (614 ft)

Population (2010 Census)
  - Total: 2,867
  - Estimate (2021): 2,483 (−13.4%)
- Time zone: UTC+4 (MSK+1)
- Postal code: 412815
- OKTMO ID: 63622154051

Kamensky (Russian: Каменский) is an urban locality (an urban-type settlement) in Krasnoarmeysky District of Saratov Oblast, Russia. Population: 2,867 (2010 census); 3,644 (2002 census); 2,308 (1989 Soviet census).
