= Krasnoarmeysk, Russia =

Set index of articles associated with the same name

Krasnoarmeysk (Russian: Красноарме́йск) is the name of several urban localities in Russia:

- Krasnoarmeysk, Moscow Oblast, a town in Moscow Oblast, administratively incorporated as a town under oblast jurisdiction
- Krasnoarmeysk, Saratov Oblast, a town in Saratov Oblast, administratively incorporated as a town under oblast jurisdiction
