= Sovetskoye, Saratov Oblast =

Sovetskoye Советское
- Urban-type settlement
- Interactive map of Sovetskoye
- Location of Sovetskoye Sovetskoye (Saratov Oblast)
- Coordinates: 51.4460°N 46.7435°E
- Country: Russia
- Federal subject: Saratov Oblast
- Administrative district: Sovetsky District
- Founded: 1766

Population (2010 Census)
  - Total: 3,348
  - Estimate (2021): 2,816 (−15.9%)
- Time zone: UTC+4 (MSK+1)
- Postal code: 413205
- OKTMO ID: 63644158051

Sovetskoye (Russian: Советское) is an urban locality (an urban-type settlement) in Sovetsky District of Saratov Oblast, Russia. Population: 3,348 (2010 census); 3,516 (2002 census); 3,575 (1989 Soviet census).
