= Marksovsky =

Marksovsky (masculine), Marksovskaya (feminine), or Marksovskoye (neuter) may refer to:

- Marksovsky District, a district of Saratov Oblast, Russia
- Marksovsky (rural locality), a rural locality (a settlement) in Orenburg Oblast, Russia
