= Sennoy, Saratov Oblast =

Sennoy Сенной
- Urban-type settlement
- Interactive map of Sennoy
- Location of Sennoy Sennoy (Saratov Oblast)
- Coordinates: 52.1571°N 46.9634°E
- Country: Russia
- Federal subject: Saratov Oblast
- Administrative district: Volsky District

Population (2010 Census)
  - Total: 6,675
  - Estimate (2021): 5,881 (−11.9%)
- Time zone: UTC+4 (MSK+1)
- Postal code: 412975
- OKTMO ID: 63611154051

Sennoy (Russian: Сенной) is an urban locality (an urban-type settlement) in Volsky District of Saratov Oblast, Russia. Population: 6,675 (2010 census); 7,031 (2002 census); 6,329 (1989 Soviet census).
