= Pugachyovsky District =

Pugachyovsky District Пугачёвский район (Russian)
- District
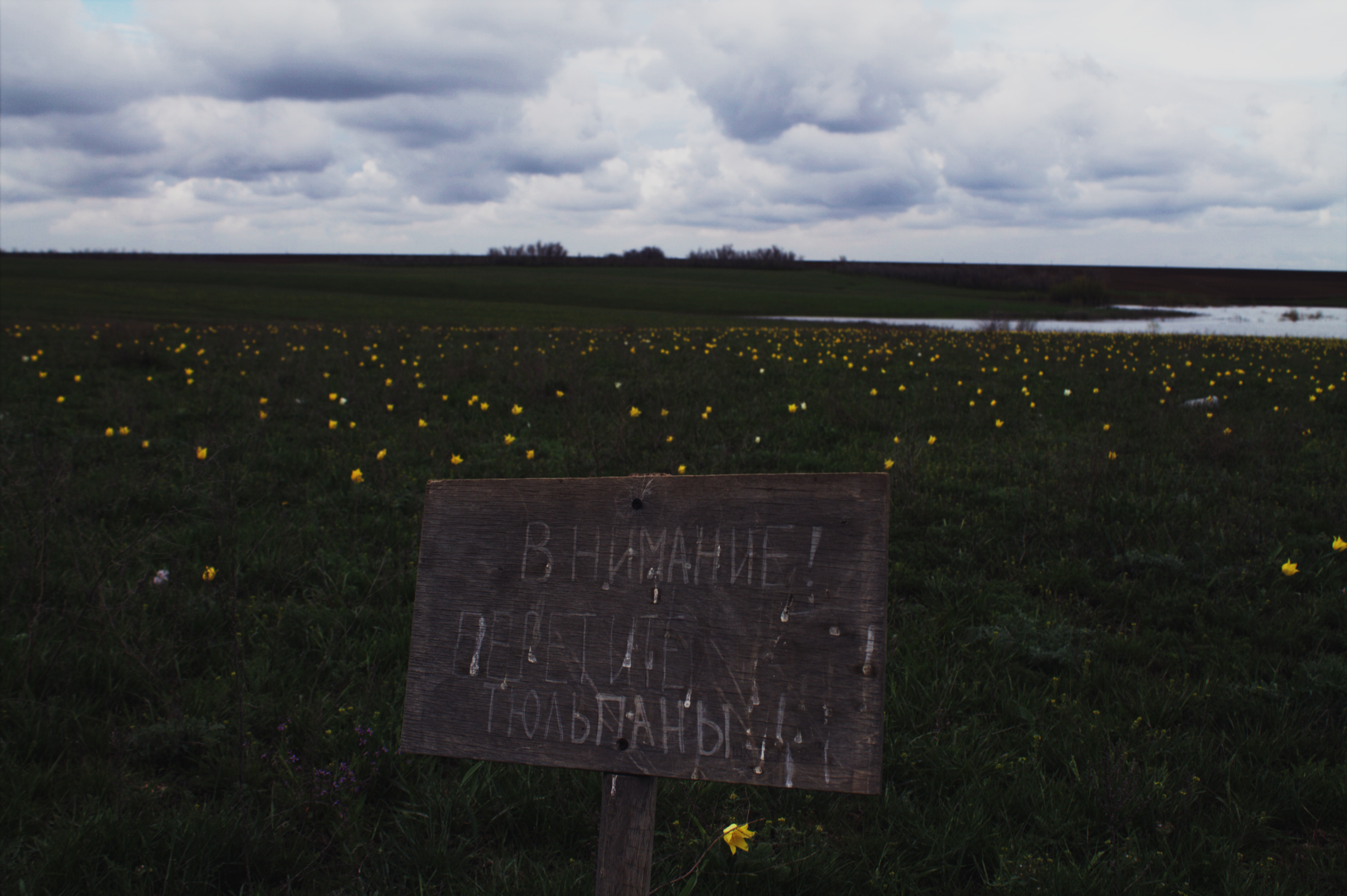
- Tulip steppe, a protected area of Russia in Pugachyovsky District

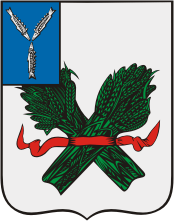
- Coat of arms
- Location of Pugachyovsky District in Saratov Oblast
- Coordinates: 52°01′N 48°48′E
- Country: Russia
- Federal subject: Saratov Oblast
- Established: 23 July 1928
- Administrative center: Pugachyov

Area
  - Total: 3,900.6 km^{2} (1,506.0 sq mi)

Population (2010 Census)
  - Total: 20,031
  - Density: 5.1354/km^{2} (13.301/sq mi)
  - Urban: 0%
  - Rural: 100%

Administrative structure
  - Inhabited localities: 63 rural localities

Municipal structure
  - Municipally incorporated as: Pugachyovsky Municipal District
  - Municipal divisions: 1 urban settlements, 8 rural settlements
- Time zone: UTC+4 (MSK+1)
- OKTMO ID: 63637000
- Website: http://pugachev-adm.ru

Population of Pugachyovsky District
- 2010 Census: 20,031
- 2002 Census: 23,574
- 1989 Census: 24,510
- 1979 Census: 25,455

Pugachyovsky District (Russian: Пугачёвский райо́н) is an administrative and municipal district (raion), one of the thirty-eight in Saratov Oblast, Russia. It is located in the northeast of the oblast. The area of the district is 3,900.6 square kilometers (1,506.0 sq mi). Its administrative center is the town of Pugachyov (which is not administratively a part of the district). As of the 2010 Census, the total population of the district was 20,031.

== Administrative and municipal status ==
Within the framework of administrative divisions, Pugachyovsky District is one of the thirty-eight in the oblast. The town of Pugachyov serves as its administrative center, despite being incorporated separately as a town under oblast jurisdiction—an administrative unit with the status equal to that of the districts (and which, in addition to Khvalynsk, also includes one rural locality).

As a municipal division, the district is incorporated as Pugachyovsky Municipal District, with Pugachyov Town Under Oblast Jurisdiction being incorporated within it as Pugachyov Urban Settlement.
