= Svobodny, Saratov Oblast =

Svobodny Свободный
- Urban-type settlement
- Interactive map of Svobodny
- Location of Svobodny Svobodny (Saratov Oblast)
- Coordinates: 52.3314°N 46.3698°E
- Country: Russia
- Federal subject: Saratov Oblast
- Administrative district: Bazarno-Karabulaksky District

Population (2010 Census)
  - Total: 2,160
  - Estimate (2021): 1,820 (−15.7%)
- Time zone: UTC+4 (MSK+1)
- Postal codes: 412616, 412610
- OKTMO ID: 63606156051

Svobodny (Russian: Свободный) is an urban locality (an urban-type settlement) in Bazarno-Karabulaksky District of Saratov Oblast, Russia. Population: 2,160 (2010 census); 2,292 (2002 census); 2,309 (1989 Soviet census).
