= Krasnoarmeysky District, Saratov Oblast =

Krasnoarmeysky District Красноармейский район (Russian)
- District
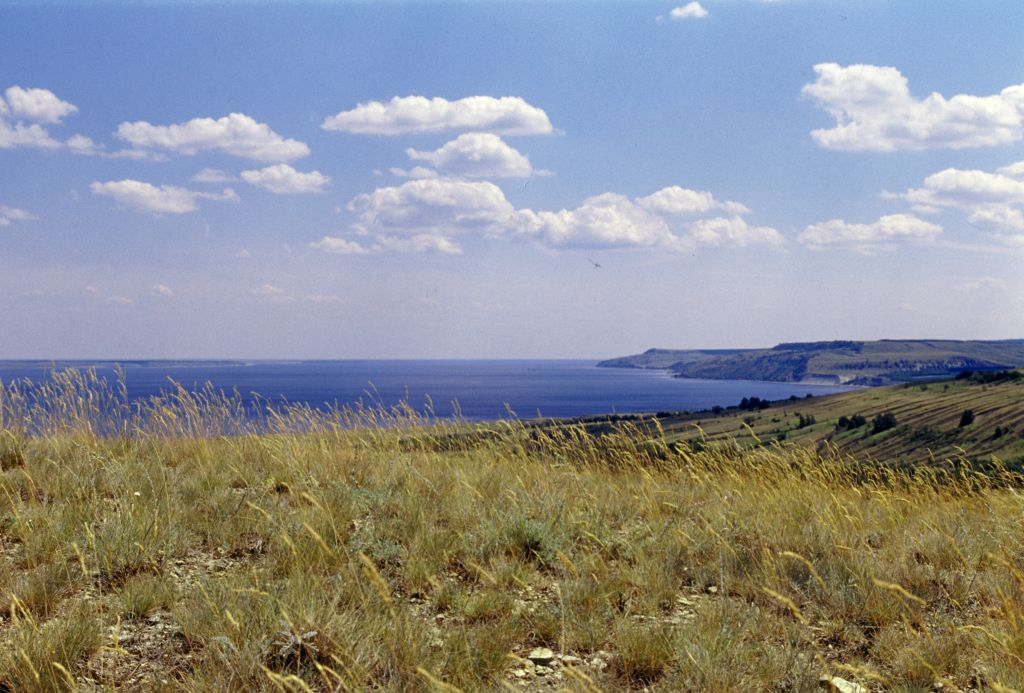
- A Volga River bank in Bannovskoye protected area of Russia in Krasnoarmeysky District

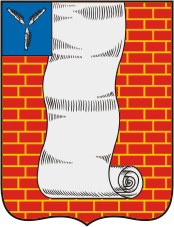
- Coat of arms
- Location of Krasnoarmeysky District in Saratov Oblast
- Coordinates: 51°01′N 45°42′E
- Country: Russia
- Federal subject: Saratov Oblast
- Established: 7 September 1941
- Administrative center: Krasnoarmeysk

Area
  - Total: 3,300 km^{2} (1,300 sq mi)

Population (2010 Census)
  - Total: 24,375
  - Density: 7.4/km^{2} (19/sq mi)
  - Urban: 11.8%
  - Rural: 88.2%

Administrative structure
  - Inhabited localities: 1 urban-type settlements, 40 rural localities

Municipal structure
  - Municipally incorporated as: Krasnoarmeysky Municipal District
  - Municipal divisions: 2 urban settlements, 9 rural settlements
- Time zone: UTC+4 (MSK+1)
- OKTMO ID: 63622000
- Website: http://krasnoarmeysk.sarmo.ru

Krasnoarmeysky District (Russian: Красноарме́йский райо́н) is an administrative and municipal district (raion), one of the thirty-eight in Saratov Oblast, Russia. It is located in the south of the oblast. The area of the district is 3,300 square kilometers (1,300 sq mi). Its administrative center is the town of Krasnoarmeysk which is not administratively a part of the district). Population: 24,375 (2010 Census); 25,192 (2002 census); 23,404 (1989 Soviet census).

== Administrative and municipal status ==
Within the framework of administrative divisions, Krasnoarmeysky District is one of the thirty-eight in the oblast. The town of Krasnoarmeysk serves as its administrative center, despite being incorporated separately as a town under oblast jurisdiction—an administrative unit with the status equal to that of the districts.

As a municipal division, the district is incorporated as Krasnoarmeysky Municipal District, with Krasnoarmeysk Town Under Oblast Jurisdiction being incorporated within it as Krasnoarmeysk Urban Settlement.
