= Lenins Weg (Balzer newspaper) =

- Founded: 1931
- Ceased publication: 1941
- Political alignment: Communist
- Language: German language
- Headquarters: Balzer

Lenins Weg ('Path of Lenin') was a German language newspaper published from Balzer, Russian SFSR, Soviet Union 1931–1941. It was an organ of the Balzer Canton Party Committee, the Balzer Canton Trade Union Council and the Balzer Canton Executive Committee. It was published every three days, with 2,800 copies per issue. The newspaper was closed on August 10, 1941.
