= Balakovsky District =

Balakovsky District Балаковский район (Russian)
- District
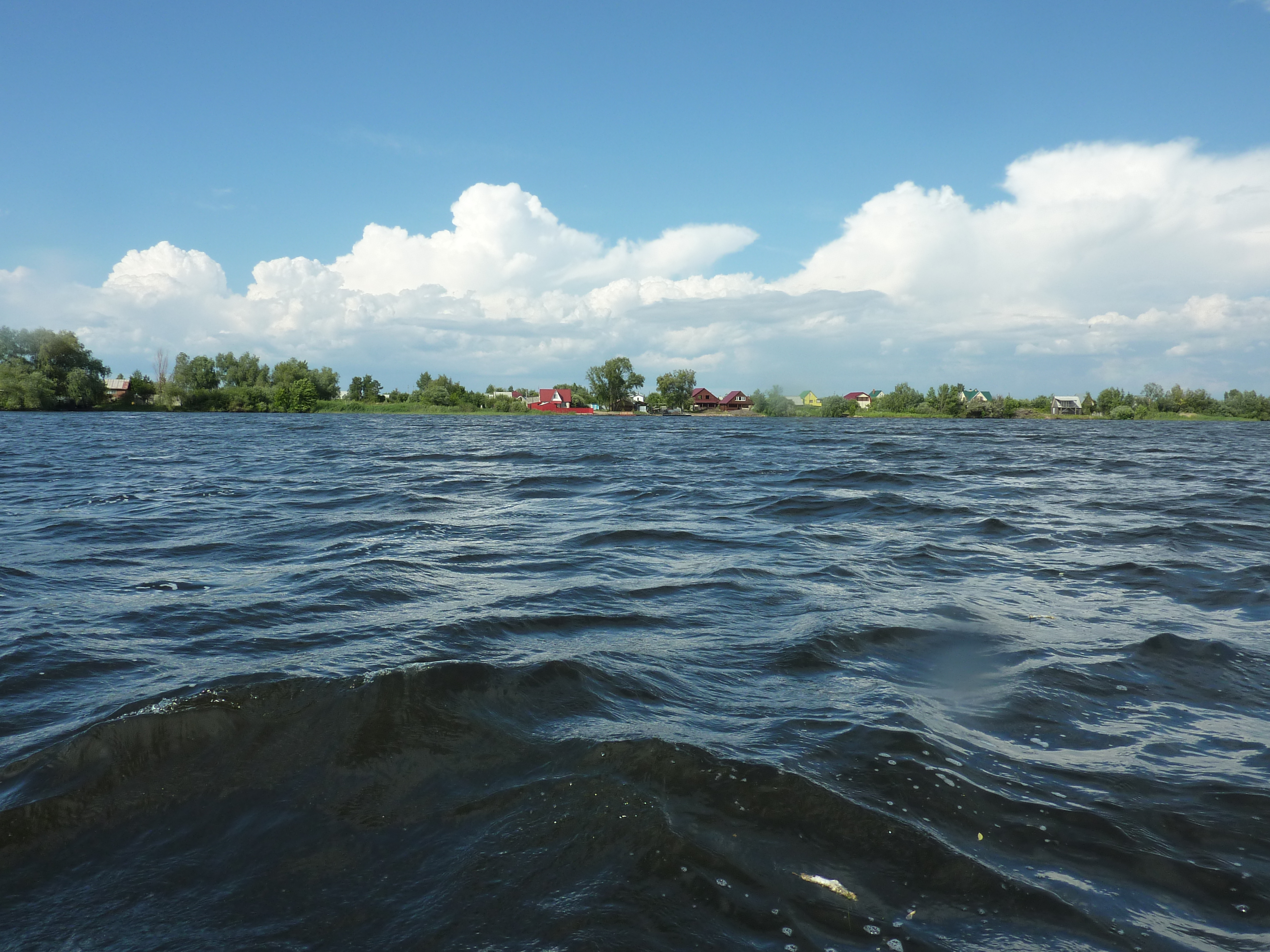
- Waterfront villas, Balakovsky District

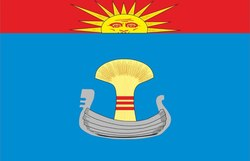
- Flag Coat of arms
- Location of Balakovsky District in Saratov Oblast
- Coordinates: 52°02′N 47°47′E
- Country: Russia
- Federal subject: Saratov Oblast
- Established: 23 July 1928
- Administrative center: Balakovo

Area
  - Total: 3,100 km^{2} (1,200 sq mi)

Population (2010 Census)
  - Total: 19,617
  - Density: 6.3/km^{2} (16/sq mi)
  - Urban: 0%
  - Rural: 100%

Administrative structure
  - Inhabited localities: 47 rural localities

Municipal structure
  - Municipally incorporated as: Balakovsky Municipal District
  - Municipal divisions: 1 urban settlements, 2 rural settlements
- Time zone: UTC+4 (MSK+1)
- OKTMO ID: 63607000
- Website: http://www.admbal.ru/

Balakovsky District (Russian: Балако́вский райо́н) is an administrative and municipal district (raion), one of the thirty-eight in Saratov Oblast, Russia. It is located in the north of the oblast. The area of the district is 3,100 square kilometers (1,200 sq mi). Its administrative center is the city of Balakovo (which is not administratively a part of the district). Population: 19,617 (2010 Census); 20,192 (2002 census); 18,946 (1989 Soviet census).

== Administrative and municipal status ==
Within the framework of administrative divisions, Balakovsky District is one of the thirty-eight in the oblast. The city of Balakovo serves as its administrative center, despite being incorporated separately as a city under oblast jurisdiction—an administrative unit with the status equal to that of the districts.

As a municipal division, the district is incorporated as Balakovsky Municipal District, with Balakovo City Under Oblast Jurisdiction being incorporated within it as Balakovo Urban Settlement.
