= Volsk =

Town in Saratov Oblast, Russia

Volsk Вольск
- Town
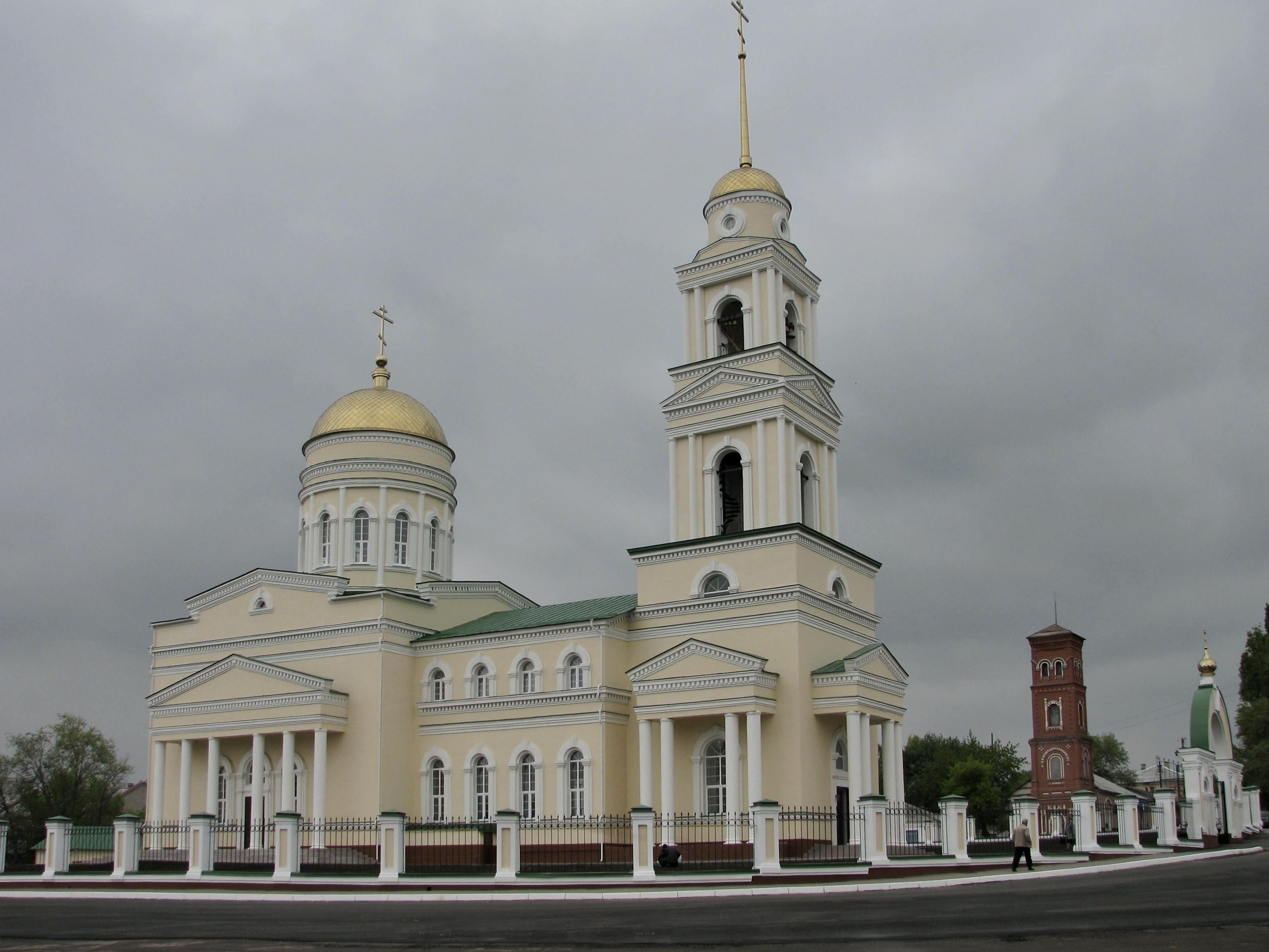
- Trinity Church in Volsk

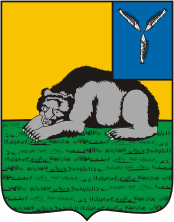
- Coat of arms
- Interactive map of Volsk
- Location of Volsk Volsk (Saratov Oblast)
- Coordinates: 52°03′N 47°23′E
- Country: Russia
- Federal subject: Saratov Oblast
- Founded: 1699
- Town status since: 1780
- Elevation: 90 m (300 ft)

Population (2010 Census)
  - Total: 66,508
  - Estimate (2025): 52,825 (−20.6%)
  - Rank: 234th in 2010

Administrative status
  - Subordinated to: town of oblast significance of Volsk
  - Capital of: Volsky District, town of oblast significance of Volsk

Municipal status
  - Municipal district: Volsky Municipal District
  - Urban settlement: Volsk Urban Settlement
  - Capital of: Volsky Municipal District, Volsk Urban Settlement
- Time zone: UTC+4 (MSK+1)
- Postal codes: 412900–412906, 412909, 412911, 412913, 412916, 412918, 412919, 412921
- Dialing code: +7 84593
- OKTMO ID: 63611101001

Volsk population
- 2010 Census: 66,508
- 2002 Census: 71,124
- 1989 Census: 65,683
- 1979 Census: 65,749

Volsk (Russian: Вольск) is a town in Saratov Oblast, Russia, located on the right bank of the Volga River, opposite the mouth of the Bolshoy Irgiz (a tributary of the Volga), 147 kilometers (91 mi) northeast from Saratov, the administrative center of the oblast. As of the 2021 Census, its population was 55,035.

== History ==
It was founded in 1699 as the sloboda of Malykovka (Малыковка) and was granted town status and renamed Volgsk (Волгск) in 1780. In the 19th century, the name gradually changed to a more pronounceable "Volsk". After the October Revolution of 1917, Volsk became a major center of cement production.

=== 2019 Volsk school attack ===
On the morning of 28 May 2019. 15-year-old seventh-grader Daniil Pulkin threw two Molotov cocktails and hit a 12-year-old girl on the head with an axe, after which he fled the scene of the crime. The attacker was detained the same day.

== Administrative and municipal status ==
Within the framework of administrative divisions, Volsk serves as the administrative center of Volsky District, even though it is not a part of it. As an administrative division, it is, together with the work settlement of Kleny and three rural localities, incorporated separately as the town of oblast significance of Volsk—an administrative unit with the status equal to that of the districts. As a municipal division, the town of oblast significance of Volsk is incorporated within Volsky Municipal District as Volsk Urban Settlement.

== See also ==
- Tomka gas test site
