= Petrovsk, Saratov Oblast =

Town in Saratov Oblast, Russia

Petrovsk Петровск
- Town
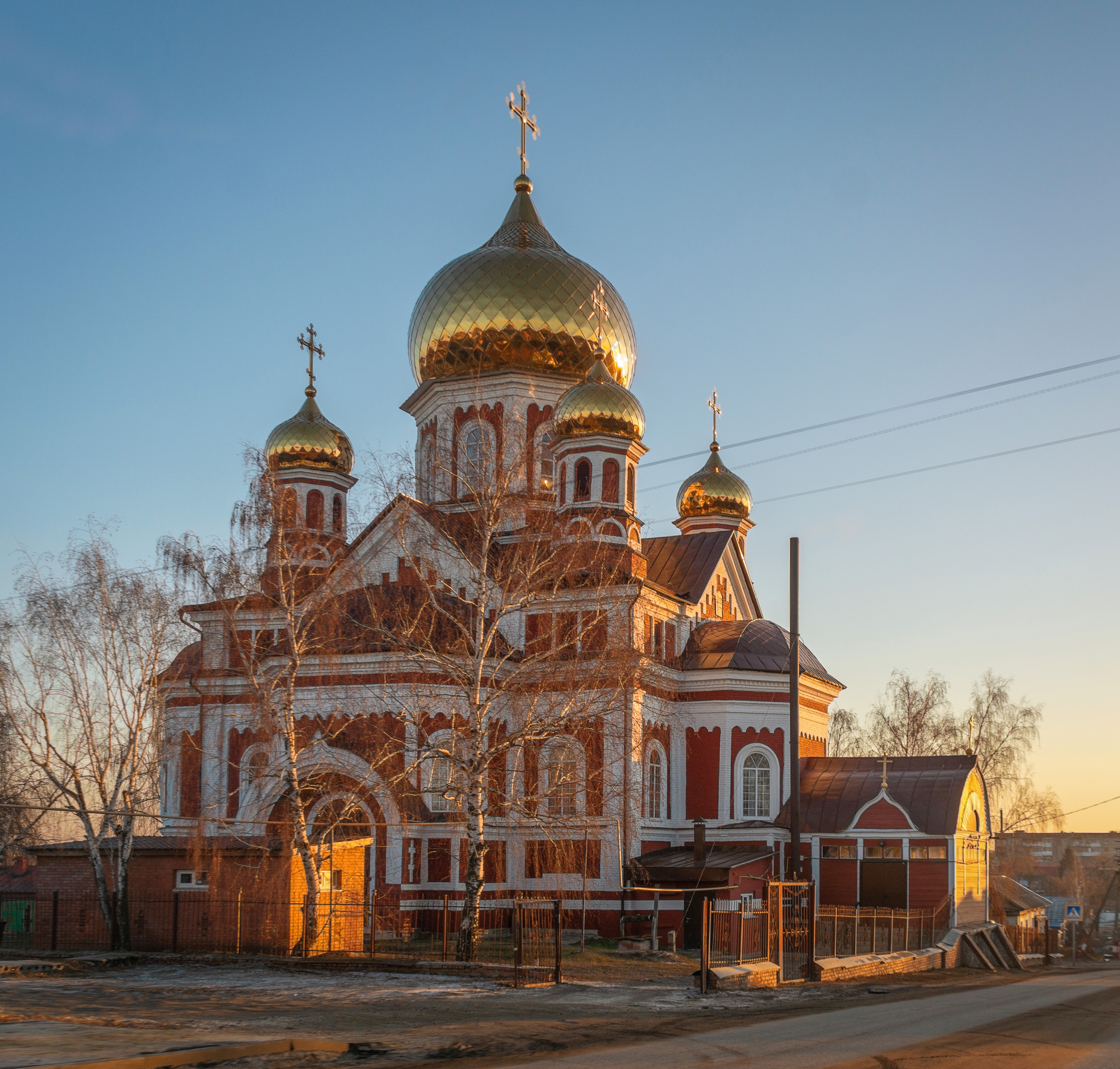
- Church of the Kazan Icon of the Mother of God

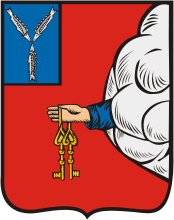
- Coat of arms
- Interactive map of Petrovsk
- Location of Petrovsk Petrovsk (Saratov Oblast)
- Coordinates: 52°19′N 45°23′E
- Country: Russia
- Federal subject: Saratov Oblast
- Founded: 1698
- Town status since: 1780
- Elevation: 180 m (590 ft)

Population (2010 Census)
  - Total: 31,160
  - Estimate (2021): 26,319 (−15.5%)

Administrative status
  - Subordinated to: Petrovsk Town Under Oblast Jurisdiction
  - Capital of: Petrovsky District, Petrovsk Town Under Oblast Jurisdiction

Municipal status
  - Municipal district: Petrovsky Municipal District
  - Urban settlement: Petrovsk Urban Settlement
  - Capital of: Petrovsky Municipal District, Petrovsk Urban Settlement
- Time zone: UTC+4 (MSK+1)
- Postal code: 412540–412545
- Dialing code: +7 84555
- OKTMO ID: 63635101001
- Website: petrovsk64.ru

Petrovsk (/pɪˈtrɒfsk/; Russian: Петровск [pʲɪˈtrofsk]) is a town in Saratov Oblast, Russia, located on the Medveditsa River (left tributary of the Don) 104 kilometers (65 mi) northwest of Saratov, the administrative center of the oblast. It had a population of 31,160 (2010 census); 33,956 (2002 census); 34,778 (1989 Soviet census).

== History ==
Petrovsk is an old merchant city, founded by the personal decree of Peter the Great in 1698 to protect the region from the raids of the Crimean Tatars, and also "so that from now on, free people do not come to the roundabout cities and do not repair any ruin ...". According to legend, the founder personally visited the city in 1707. The construction of the Petrovsk fortress was of great importance for its time, since a land road from Tsaritsyn to Moscow lay from Saratov through Atkarsk and Penza, and the sparsely populated banks of the Medveditsa abounded with robber bands that robbed those who passed along the road. A fortified guard line with settlements began from Petrovsk. The fortress itself had a 4-sided shape, it was surrounded by double oak walls with 8 towers covered with timber. Inside the fortress there were the Cathedral of Peter and Paul, mansions for the voivode, stables, an archive, and barns. Since 1780 it has been a district town in the Saratov province. The coat of arms of the city is vowel. On July 23, 1928, the city became the center of the Petrovsky district of the Saratov district of the Nizhne-Volzhsky region (since 1936 as part of the Saratov region).

== Geography ==
It is located on the Volga Upland, on the banks of the Medveditsa River, 104 km northwest of Saratov, on the Atkarsk-Sennaya railway line of the Volga Railway, next to the Saratov — Penza highway, 12 km from the border with the Penza region. The railway station is called Petrovsk-Saratovsky to avoid confusion with the localities of the same name in the Chita and Yaroslavl regions. On the southern outskirts of the city, there was previously a military airfield Petrovsk (in the late 1990s, abandoned, partially dismantled: what remained, fell into complete disrepair).

== Administrative and municipal status ==
Within the framework of administrative divisions, Petrovsk serves as the administrative center of Petrovsky District, even though it is not a part of it. As an administrative division, it is incorporated separately as Petrovsk Town Under Oblast Jurisdiction—an administrative unit with the status equal to that of the districts. As a municipal division, Petrovsk Town Under Oblast Jurisdiction is incorporated within Petrovsky Municipal District as Petrovsk Urban Settlement.

== Transportation ==
The Petrovsk-Saratovsky railway station connects the city with Atkarsk, Saratov, Rtishchevo, Lysy Gory, Balakovo, Kalininsky, Yekaterinovka. From the bus station of the city, buses go to Saratov, Penza, Volgograd, Krasnoarmeysk, Kamyshin, Dubovka.

== Sights ==
The architectural appearance and historical flavor of the city is given by the church, built more than 100 years ago in the name of the icon of the Kazan Most Holy Theotokos (1871), the Church of the Intercession of the Most Holy Theotokos, the Ustinovs' estate, the building of the hospital, the railway station, the fire station, the city administration (the former women's gymnasium), the building of the district House of Culture (1888), the Theological school (now the general education school), which are still in good condition and protected by law as an architectural monument of the 19th century, the museum complex named after I.V. Panfilov.

== Notable people ==
- Ivan Panfilov (1893–1941), Soviet military leader, major general, commander of the famous 316th rifle division ("Panfilov"), Hero of the Soviet Union (1942, posthumously)
- Nina Iskrenko (1951–1995), poet
- Sviatoslav Knushevitsky (1908–1963), cellist, prof. Moscow Conservatory, laureate of the state prize, ZDI RSFSR
- Tatyana Kazankina (born 1951), track and field athlete, three-time Olympic champion, world record holder, ZMS of the USSR
- Nina Abramova (born 1949), six-time European champion in rowing (1968, 1969, 1970, 1971, 1972, 1973), two-time silver medalist of the World Rowing Championship in 1974 and 1977
