= Sovetsky District, Saratov Oblast =

Sovetsky District Советский район (Russian)
- District
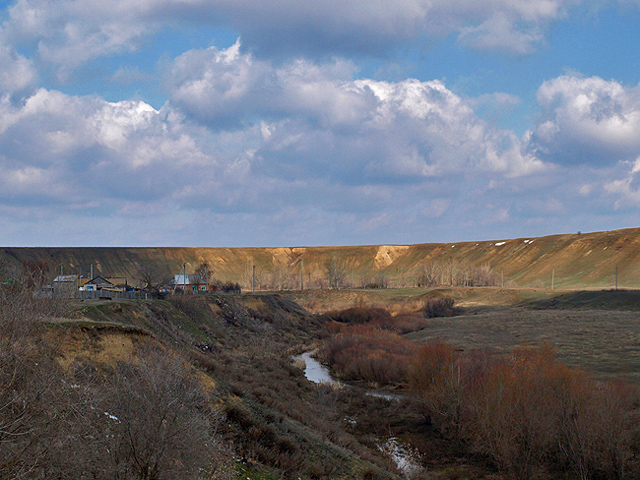
- Sovetskoye (former Marienthal), Sovetsky District

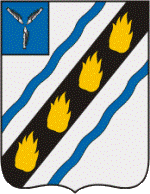
- Coat of arms
- Location of Sovetsky District in Saratov Oblast
- Coordinates: 51°23′00″N 46°50′35″E
- Country: Russia
- Federal subject: Saratov Oblast
- Established: 7 September 1941
- Administrative center: Stepnoye

Area
  - Total: 1,400 km^{2} (540 sq mi)

Population (2010 Census)
  - Total: 28,012
  - Density: 20/km^{2} (52/sq mi)
  - Urban: 67.6%
  - Rural: 32.4%

Administrative structure
  - Inhabited localities: 3 urban-type settlements, 17 rural localities

Municipal structure
  - Municipally incorporated as: Sovetsky Municipal District
  - Municipal divisions: 3 urban settlements, 6 rural settlements
- Time zone: UTC+4 (MSK+1)
- OKTMO ID: 63644000
- Website: http://stepnoeadm.ru/

Sovetsky District (Russian: Сове́тский райо́н) is an administrative and municipal district (raion), one of the thirty-eight in Saratov Oblast, Russia. It is located in the center of the oblast. The area of the district is 1,400 square kilometers (540 sq mi). Its administrative center is the urban locality (a work settlement) of Stepnoye. Population: 28,012 (2010 Census); 30,195 (2002 census); 28,936 (1989 Soviet census). The population of Stepnoye accounts for 46.9% of the district's total population.
