= Privolzhsky, Saratov Oblast =

Privolzhsky Приволжский
- Urban-type settlement
- Interactive map of Privolzhsky
- Location of Privolzhsky Privolzhsky (Saratov Oblast)
- Coordinates: 51.4033°N 46.0480°E
- Country: Russia
- Federal subject: Saratov Oblast
- Administrative district: Engelssky District

Population (2010 Census)
  - Total: 34,364
  - Estimate (2024): 32,476 (−5.5%)
- Time zone: UTC+4 (MSK+1)
- Postal code: 413119
- OKTMO ID: 63650101055

Privolzhsky (Russian: Приволжский) is an urban locality (an urban-type settlement) in Engelssky District of Saratov Oblast, Russia. Population: 34,364 (2010 census); 32,087 (2002 census); 28,910 (1989 Soviet census).
