= Nina Iskrenko =

Russian poet

Nina Yuryevna Iskrenko (Russian: Ни́на Ю́рьевна И́скренко; 26 July 1951 – 14 February 1995) was a Soviet and Russian poet. She was born in Petrovsk. Her poetry has appeared in translation in AGNI, Asymptote, Jacket, and a number of other English publications.
