= Petrovsky District, Saratov Oblast =

Petrovsky District Петровский район (Russian)
- District
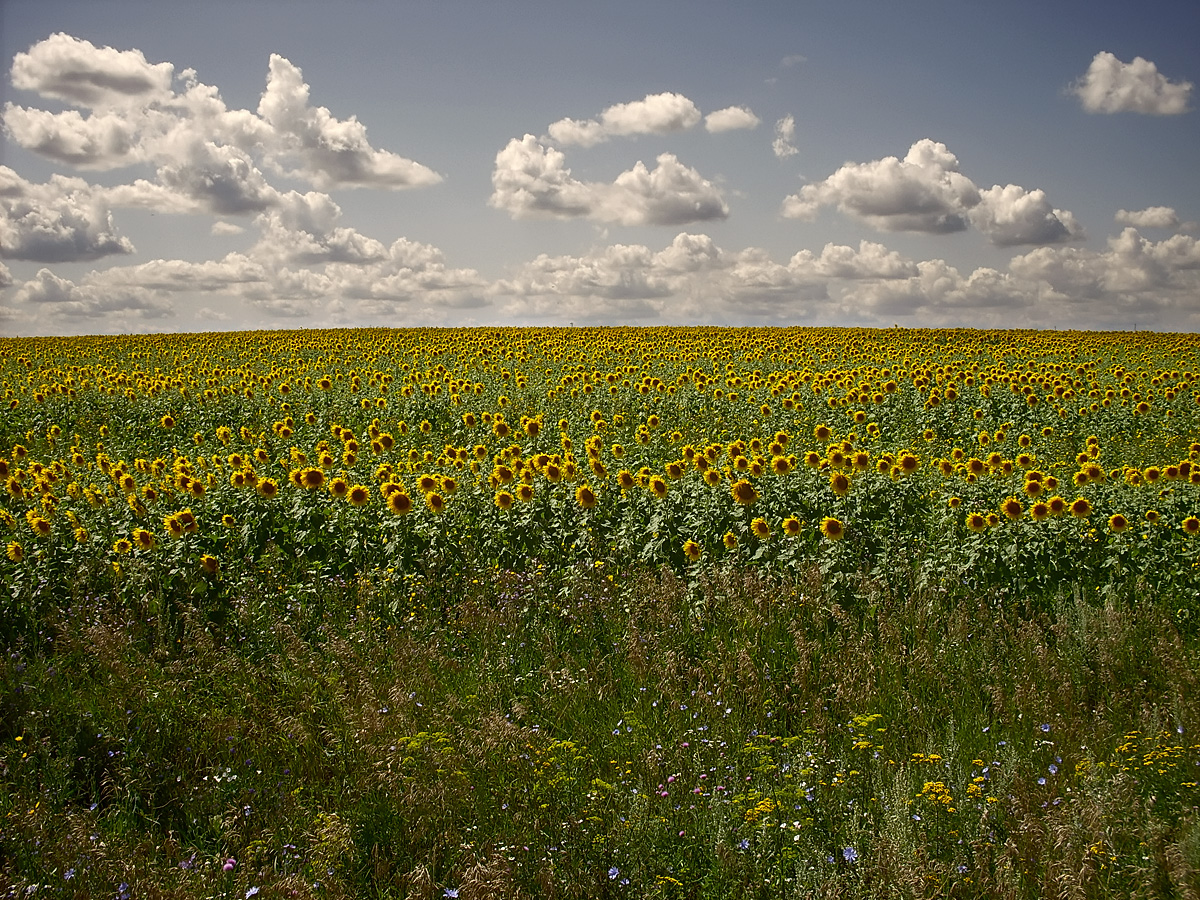
- Sunflower field, Petrovsky District

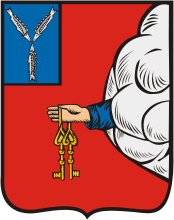
- Flag Coat of arms
- Location of Petrovsky District in Saratov Oblast
- Coordinates: 52°19′N 45°23′E
- Country: Russia
- Federal subject: Saratov Oblast
- Established: 23 July 1928
- Administrative center: Petrovsk

Area
  - Total: 2,300 km^{2} (890 sq mi)

Population (2010 Census)
  - Total: 14,538
  - Density: 6.3/km^{2} (16/sq mi)
  - Urban: 0%
  - Rural: 100%

Administrative structure
  - Inhabited localities: 65 rural localities

Municipal structure
  - Municipally incorporated as: Petrovsky Municipal District
  - Municipal divisions: 1 urban settlements, 5 rural settlements
- Time zone: UTC+4 (MSK+1)
- OKTMO ID: 63635000
- Website: http://petrovsk64.ru/

Petrovsky District (Russian: Петро́вский райо́н) is an administrative and municipal district (raion), one of the thirty-eight in Saratov Oblast, Russia. It is located in the north of the oblast. The area of the district is 2,300 square kilometers (890 sq mi). Its administrative center is the town of Petrovsk (which is not administratively a part of the district). Population: 14,538 (2010 Census); 16,474 (2002 census); 15,104 (1989 Soviet census).

== Administrative and municipal status ==
Within the framework of administrative divisions, Petrovsky District is one of the thirty-eight in the oblast. The town of Petrovsk serves as its administrative center, despite being incorporated separately as a town under oblast jurisdiction—an administrative unit with the status equal to that of the districts.

As a municipal division, the district is incorporated as Petrovsky Municipal District, with Petrovsk Town Under Oblast Jurisdiction being incorporated within it as Petrovsk Urban Settlement.
