= Engels, Saratov Oblast =

City in Saratov Oblast, Russia

Engels Энгельс
- City
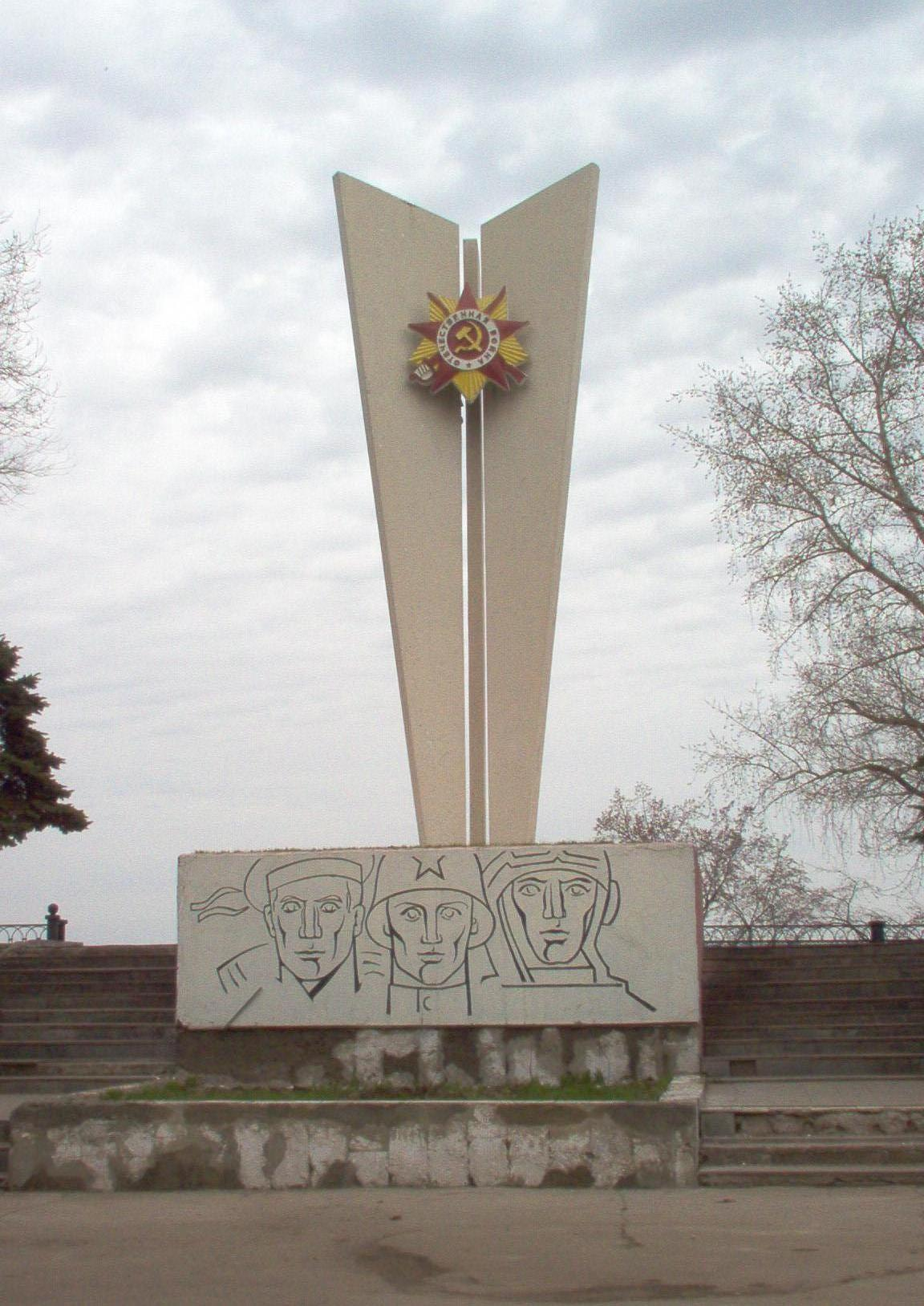
- A monument to the coat of arms of Engels

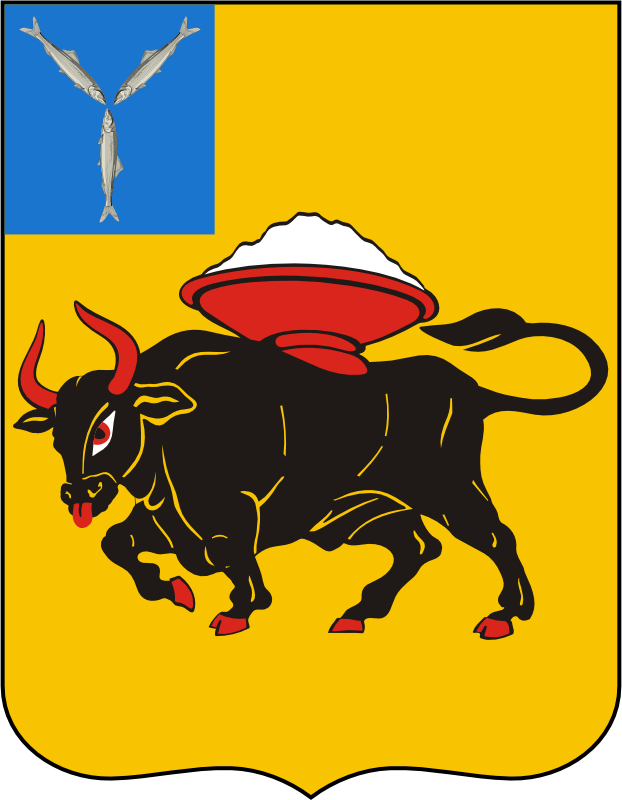
- Flag Coat of arms
- Interactive map of Engels
- Location of Engels Engels (European Russia) Engels (Europe)
- Coordinates: 51°30′06″N 46°07′20″E
- Country: Russia
- Federal subject: Saratov Oblast
- Founded: 1747
- City status since: 1914
- Elevation: 20 m (66 ft)

Population (2010 Census)
  - Total: 202,419
  - Estimate (2025): 222,115 (+9.7%)
  - Rank: 92nd in 2010

Administrative status
  - Subordinated to: Engels City Under Oblast Jurisdiction
  - Capital of: Engelssky District, Engels City Under Oblast Jurisdiction

Municipal status
  - Municipal district: Engelssky Municipal District
  - Urban settlement: Engels Urban Settlement
  - Capital of: Engelssky Municipal District, Engels Urban Settlement
- Time zone: UTC+4 (MSK+1)
- Postal codes: 413100–413102, 413105–413108, 413110–413119, 413121–413125, 413129
- Dialing code: +7 8453
- OKTMO ID: 63650101001

Engels (Russian: Энгельс, IPA: [ˈɛnɡʲɪlʲs]) is a city in Saratov Oblast, Russia. An important port located on the Volga River across from Saratov, the administrative center of the oblast, it is connected to it with a bridge. It is the second-largest city in Saratov Oblast, with a population of 202,419 (2010 census).

Historically a major center for Volga Germans, the city was known jointly as Pokrovsk (Pokrovskaya sloboda (until 1914), Pokrovsk (until 1931)) in Russian and as Kosakenstadt in German, until it was renamed after German Marxist theoretician Friedrich Engels in 1931. Engels served as the capital of the Volga German ASSR from 1918 until its abolition in 1941.

== History ==
What would become the city was founded as a sloboda named Pokrovskaya Sloboda by Ukrainian Chumak settlers in 1747. During the reign of Catherine the Great, ethnic Germans were encouraged to settle in the Volga region and many moved into the town, making it a major center of the Volga German culture. It was granted official town status and renamed Pokrovsk (Покровск) in 1914. At that time, the town was commonly known as Kosakenstadt ("Cossacks' Town") in German, alongside its official Russian name. During the Russian Civil War, the region came under control of the Bolshevik Russian SFSR, and in 1918 it became the capital of the newly established Volga German ASSR within the Russian SFSR. Pokrovsk/Kosakenstadt was renamed Engels in 1931, after German communist philosopher Friedrich Engels. The Volga German ASSR was abolished in 1941 following the German invasion of Russia, and the city became part of Saratov Oblast. Its German inhabitants suffered persecution as Soviet authorities accused them of being spies for Nazi Germany. All Germans were deported from Engels, with most being sent to Siberia and the Kazakh SSR. On August 26, 2011, a monument in honor of the Russian-German victims of repression within the Soviet Union was unveiled in the city.

Engels-2, a Russian Air Force base is nearby. The airbase was attacked numerous times by Ukrainian drones during the Russian invasion of Ukraine.

== Administrative and municipal status ==
Within the framework of administrative divisions, Engels serves as the administrative center of Engelssky District, even though it is not a part of it. As an administrative division, it is, together with four rural localities, incorporated separately as Engels City Under Oblast Jurisdiction—an administrative unit with the status equal to that of the districts. As a municipal division, Engels City Under Oblast Jurisdiction, together with the work settlement of Privolzhsky and one rural locality (the settlement of Geofizik) in Engelssky District, are incorporated within Engelssky Municipal District as Engels Urban Settlement.

== Economy ==
Engels is an industrial city. The Trolza factory manufactures trolleybuses for Russia's public transportation networks. The Engelssky factory of transport mechanical engineering produces rolling stock for railways. The Bosch-Saratov plant, previously Autotractor Spark Plugs, produces spark plugs, and the German Henkel company operates a factory producing domestic laundry detergent and chemical products for the auto-industry. The Engelssky pipe factory makes steel electro-welded pipes, steel water pipeline, and profile pipes.

In August 2015, a prototype 1520 mm gauge Bombardier Traxx F120MS locomotive was unveiled at a ceremony to mark the inauguration of First Locomotive Company's factory at Engels.

== Historical population ==
Historical population
Year	Pop.	±%
1897	21,599	—
1926	34,167	+58.2%
1939	73,240	+114.4%
1959	90,724	+23.9%
1970	130,066	+43.4%
1979	161,349	+24.1%
1989	181,201	+12.3%
2002	193,984	+7.1%
2010	202,419	+4.3%
2021	225,428	+11.4%
Source: Census data

== Sister cities ==
- Edmond, Oklahoma, United States

== Notable people ==
- Lev Kassil (1905–1970), writer
- Alfred Schnittke (1934–1998), composer
