= Rtishchevsky District =

Rtishchevsky District Ртищевский район
- District
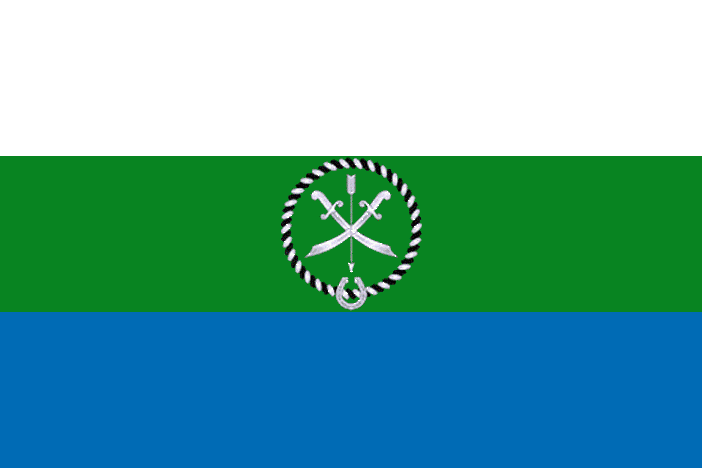
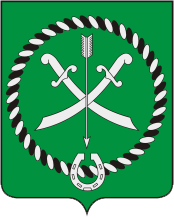
- Flag Coat of arms
- Location of Rtishchevsky District in Saratov Oblast
- Coordinates: 52°15′N 43°47′E
- Country: Russia
- Federal subject: Saratov Oblast
- Established: 23 July 1928
- Administrative center: Rtishchevo

Area
  - Total: 2,300 km^{2} (890 sq mi)

Population (2010 Census)
  - Total: 17,383
  - Density: 7.6/km^{2} (20/sq mi)
  - Urban: 0%
  - Rural: 100%

Administrative structure
  - Inhabited localities: 93 rural localities

Municipal structure
  - Municipally incorporated as: Rtishchevsky Municipal District
  - Municipal divisions: 1 urban settlements, 6 rural settlements
- Time zone: UTC+4 (MSK+1)
- OKTMO ID: 63641000
- Website: http://rtishevo.sarmo.ru/

Rtishchevsky District (Russian: Рти́щевский райо́н) is an administrative and municipal district (raion), one of the thirty-eight in Saratov Oblast, Russia. It is located in the northwest of the oblast. The area of the district is 2,300 square kilometers (890 sq mi). Its administrative center is the town of Rtishchevo (which is not administratively a part of the district). Population: 17,383 (2010 Census); 19,546 (2002 Census); 21,857 (1989 Soviet census).

== Administrative and municipal status ==
Within the framework of administrative divisions, Rtishchevsky District is one of the thirty-eight in the oblast. The town of Rtishchevo serves as its administrative center, despite being incorporated separately as a town under oblast jurisdiction—an administrative unit with the status equal to that of the districts.

As a municipal division, the district is incorporated as Rtishchevsky Municipal District, with Rtishchevo Town Under Oblast Jurisdiction being incorporated within it as Rtishchevo Urban Settlement.

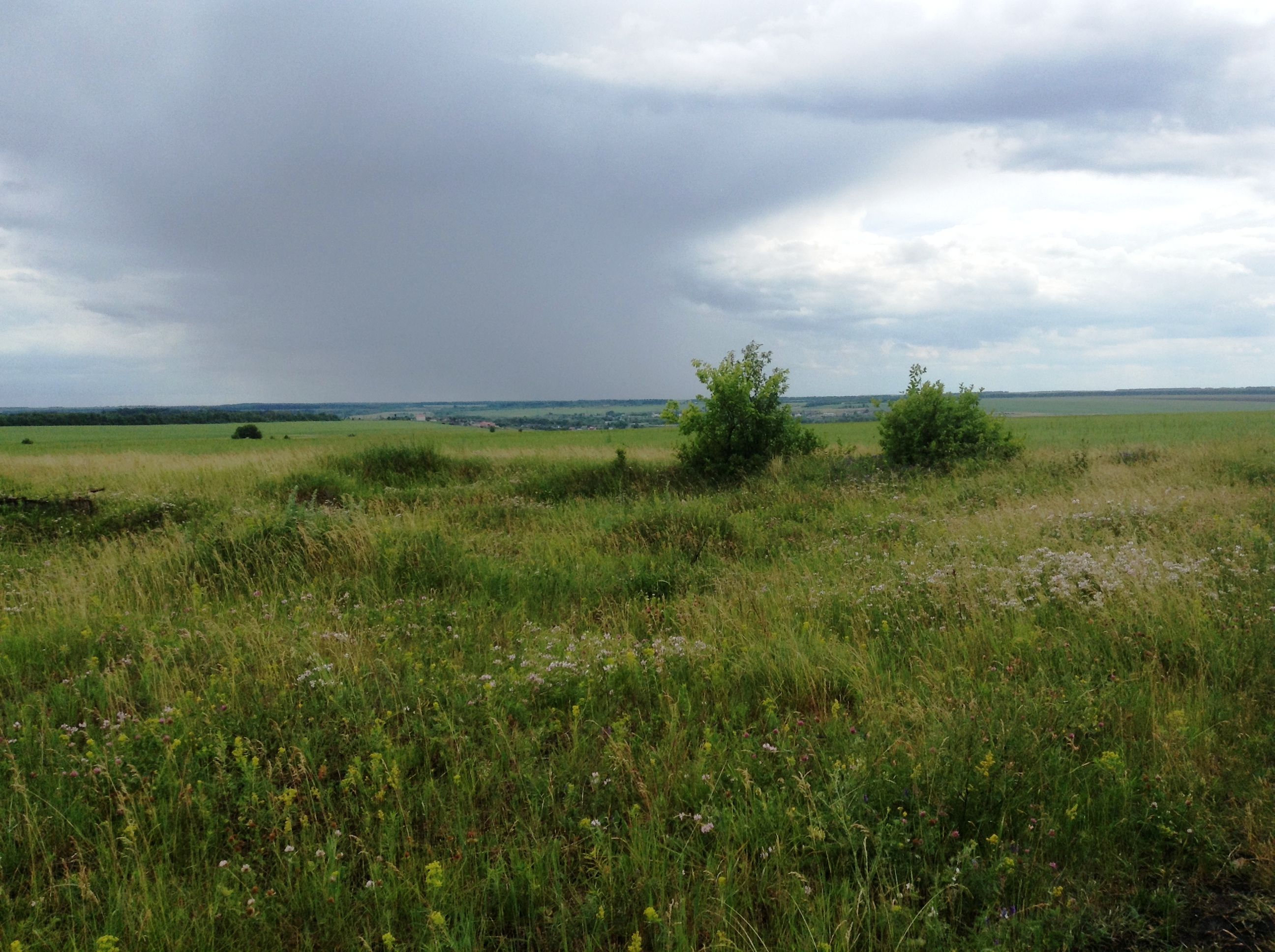

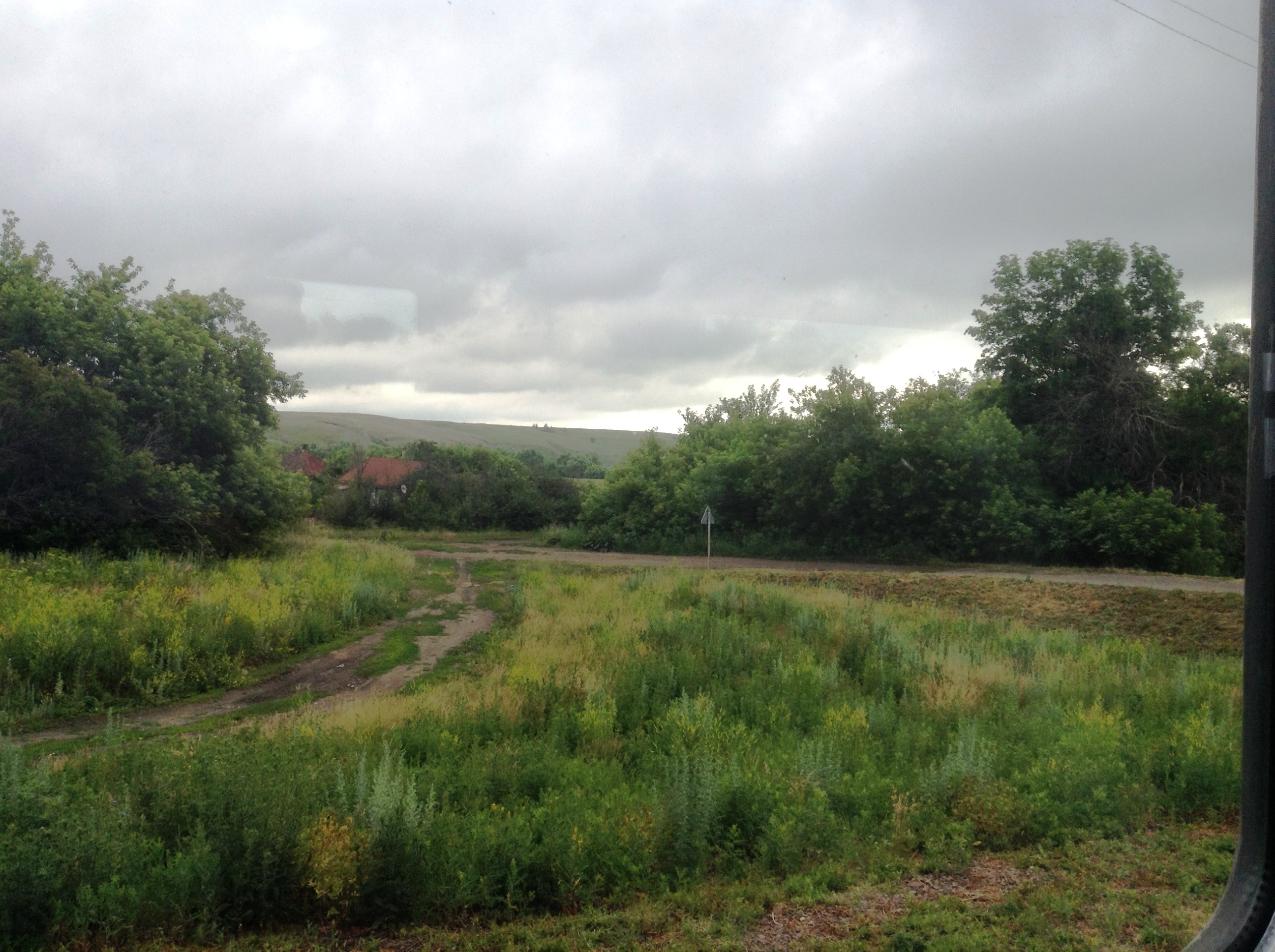

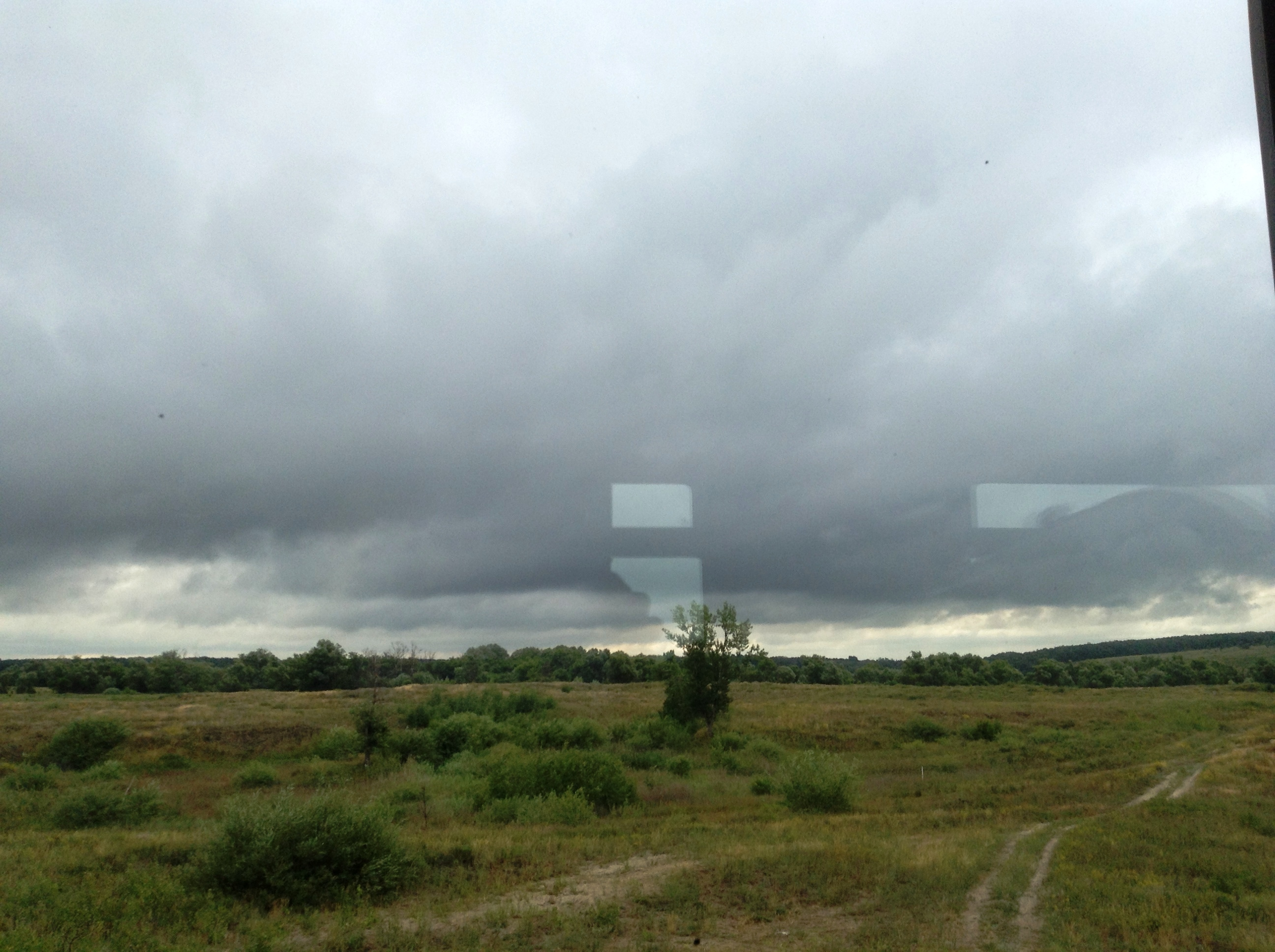
