= Engelssky District =

Engelssky District Энгельсский район (Russian)
- District
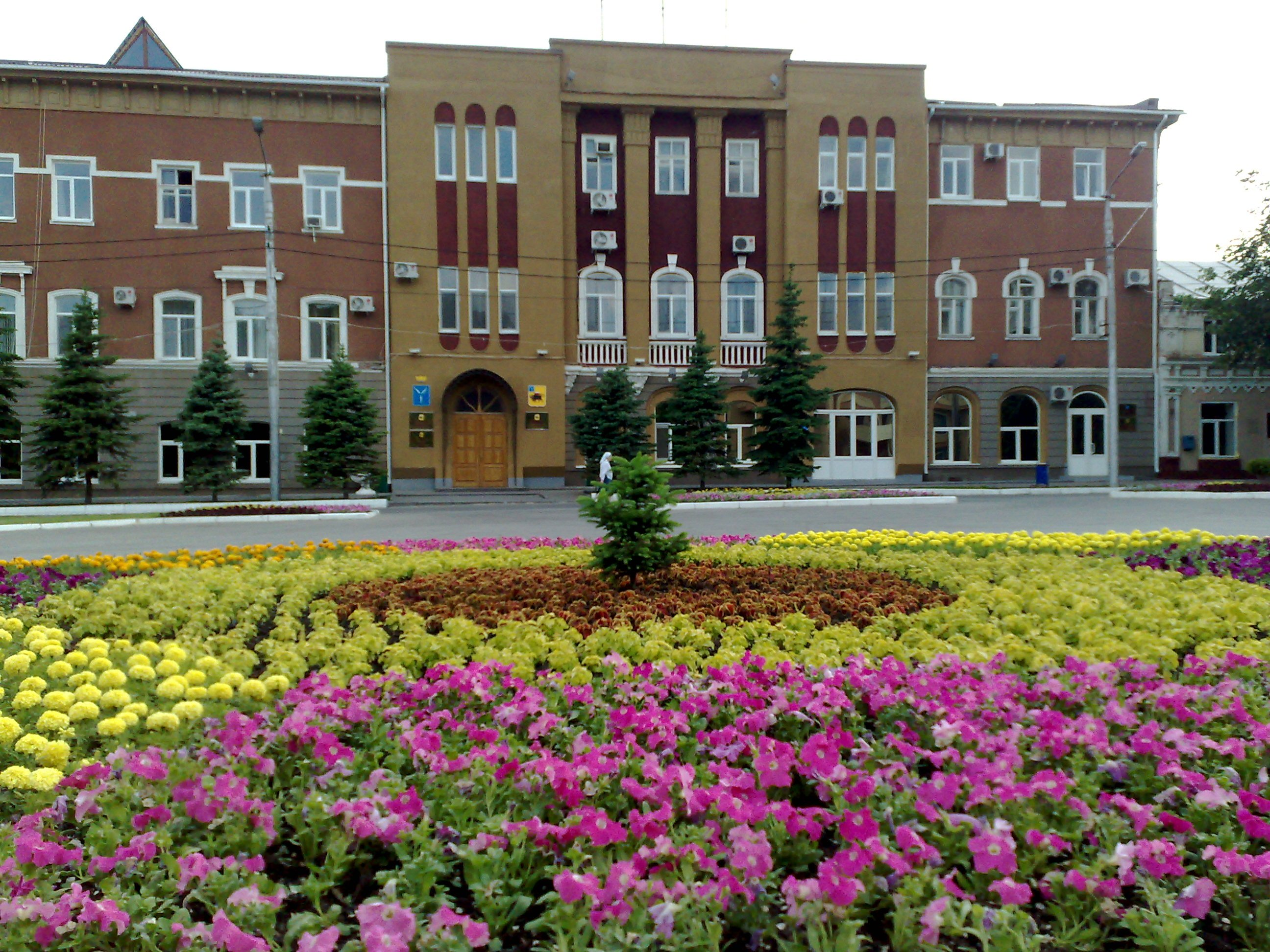
- Engelssky District Administration building

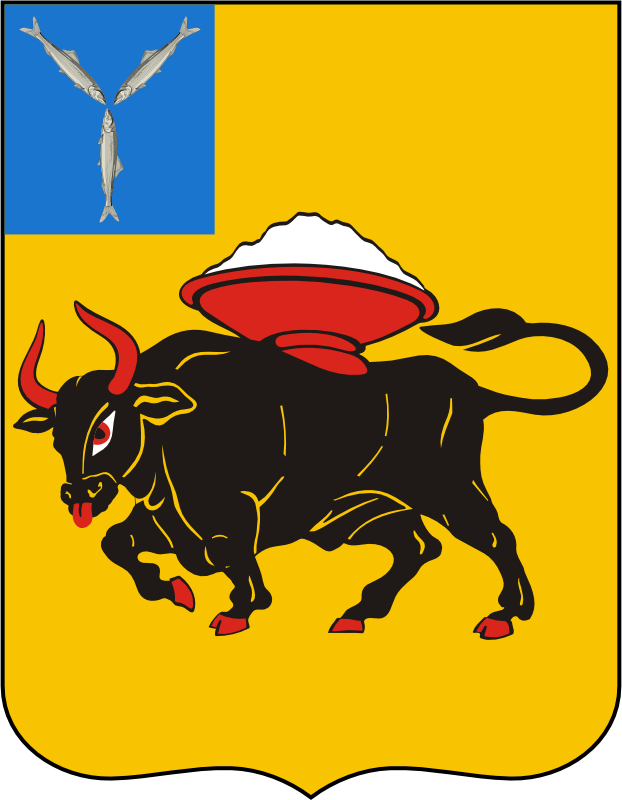
- Flag Coat of arms
- Location of Engelssky District in Saratov Oblast
- Coordinates: 51°28′N 46°07′E
- Country: Russia
- Federal subject: Saratov Oblast
- Established: 7 September 1941
- Administrative center: Engels

Area
  - Total: 3,100 km^{2} (1,200 sq mi)

Population (2010 Census)
  - Total: 44,832
  - Density: 14/km^{2} (37/sq mi)
  - Urban: 0%
  - Rural: 100%

Administrative structure
  - Inhabited localities: 1 urban-type settlements, 55 rural localities

Municipal structure
  - Municipally incorporated as: Engelssky Municipal District
  - Municipal divisions: 1 urban settlements, 4 rural settlements
- Time zone: UTC+4 (MSK+1)
- OKTMO ID: 63650000
- Website: http://www.engels-city.ru/

Engelssky District (Russian: Э́нгельсский райо́н) is an administrative and municipal district (raion), one of the thirty-eight in Saratov Oblast, Russia. It is located in the center of the oblast. The area of the district is 3,100 square kilometers (1,200 sq mi). Its administrative center is the city of Engels (which is not administratively a part of the district). Population: 44,832 (2010 Census); 44,528 (2002 census); 42,312 (1989 Soviet census).

== Administrative and municipal status ==
Within the framework of administrative divisions, Engelssky District is one of the thirty-eight in the oblast. The city of Engels serves as its administrative center, despite being incorporated separately as a city under oblast jurisdiction—an administrative unit with the status equal to that of the districts (and which, in addition to Engels, also includes four rural localities).

As a municipal division, the district is incorporated as Engelssky Municipal District, with Engels City Under Oblast Jurisdiction and two rural localities administratively subordinated to Engelssky District being incorporated within it as Engels Urban Settlement.
