= Krasnoarmeysk, Saratov Oblast =

Town in Saratov Oblast, Russia

Krasnoarmeysk Красноармейск
- Town
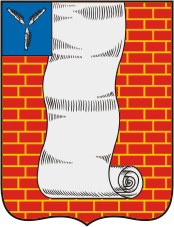
- Coat of arms
- Interactive map of Krasnoarmeysk
- Location of Krasnoarmeysk Krasnoarmeysk (Saratov Oblast)
- Coordinates: 51°01′23″N 45°42′11″E
- Country: Russia
- Federal subject: Saratov Oblast
- Founded: 1764–1766
- Town status since: 1918
- Elevation: 210 m (690 ft)

Population (2010 Census)
  - Total: 24,364
  - Estimate (2021): 21,350 (−12.4%)

Administrative status
  - Subordinated to: Krasnoarmeysk Town Under Oblast Jurisdiction
  - Capital of: Krasnoarmeysky District, Krasnoarmeysk Town Under Oblast Jurisdiction

Municipal status
  - Municipal district: Krasnoarmeysky Municipal District
  - Urban settlement: Krasnoarmeysk Urban Settlement
  - Capital of: Krasnoarmeysky Municipal District, Krasnoarmeysk Urban Settlement
- Time zone: UTC+4 (MSK+1)
- Postal codes: 412800–412802, 412804
- Dialing code: +7 84550
- OKTMO ID: 63622101001

Krasnoarmeysk (Russian: Красноарме́йск) is a town in Saratov Oblast, Russia, located 75 kilometers (47 mi) south of Saratov, the administrative center of the oblast. Population: 24,364 (2010 census); 25,411 (2002 census); 24,055 (1989 Soviet census).

== History ==
It was founded in 1764—1766 as the German colony of Baltser (Russian: Ба́льцер; German: Balzer); the last name of one of the colonists. The other name of the colony was Goly Karamysh (Голый Карамыш), after the river on which it was located. The "Karamysh" part in the river's name means muddy, silty, smudgy, while the "Goly" part alludes to the steppes and the lack of forests in the area; cf. Lesnoy Karamysh River (lit. the Karamysh River in the forests).

In the mid-19th century, the double name of Goly Karamysh (Balzer) (Голый Карамыш (Бальзер)) was officially used, but it was shortened to just Baltser in 1926. Town status was granted in 1918. During World War II, the region was cleansed of German geographic names, with Baltser renamed Krasnoarmeysk (after the Red Army) in 1942.

== Administrative and municipal status ==
Within the framework of administrative divisions, Krasnoarmeysk serves as the administrative center of Krasnoarmeysky District, even though it is not a part of it. As an administrative division, it is incorporated separately as Krasnoarmeysk Town Under Oblast Jurisdiction—an administrative unit with the status equal to that of the districts. As a municipal division, Krasnoarmeysk Town Under Oblast Jurisdiction is incorporated within Krasnoarmeysky Municipal District as Krasnoarmeysk Urban Settlement.
