= Balashov (town) =

Town in Saratov Oblast, Russia

Balashov Балашов
- Town
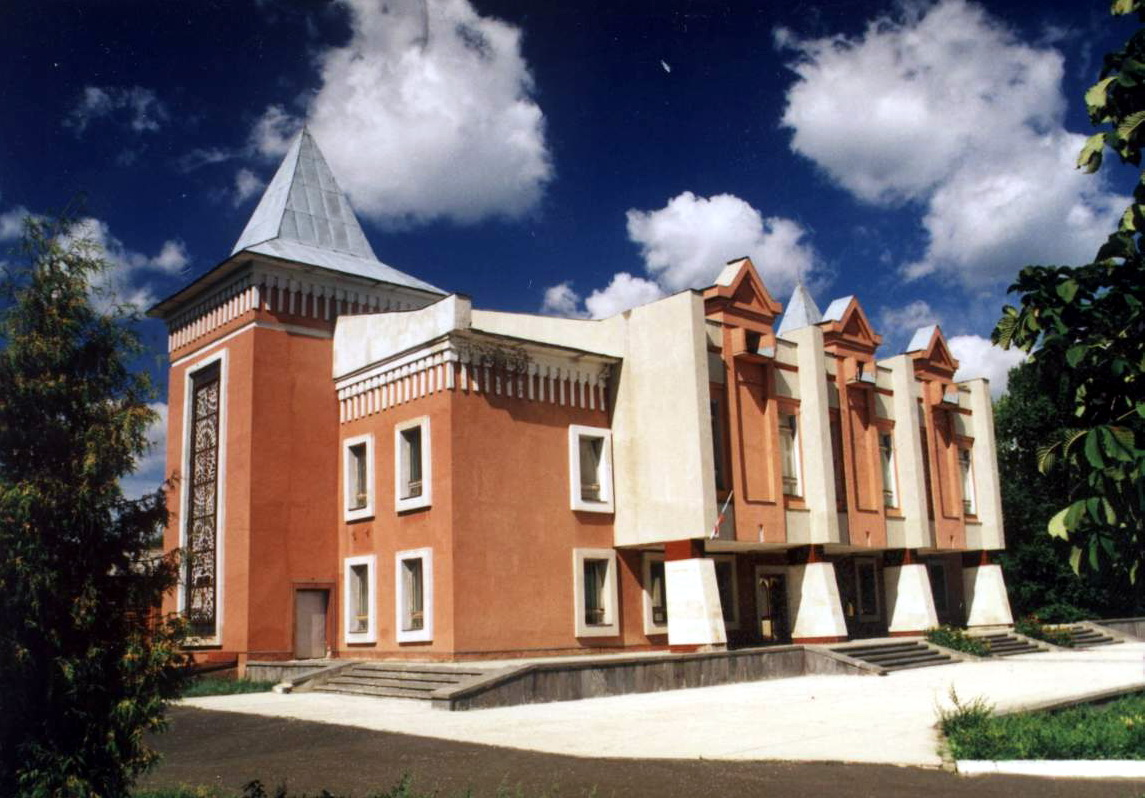
- Balashov Museum of Local History

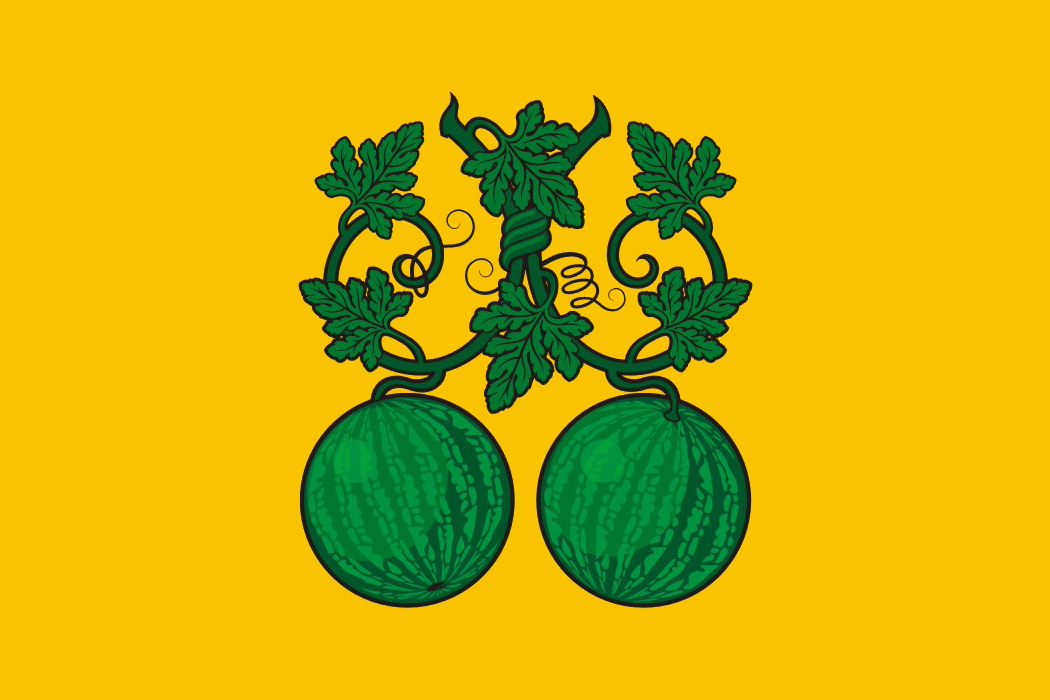
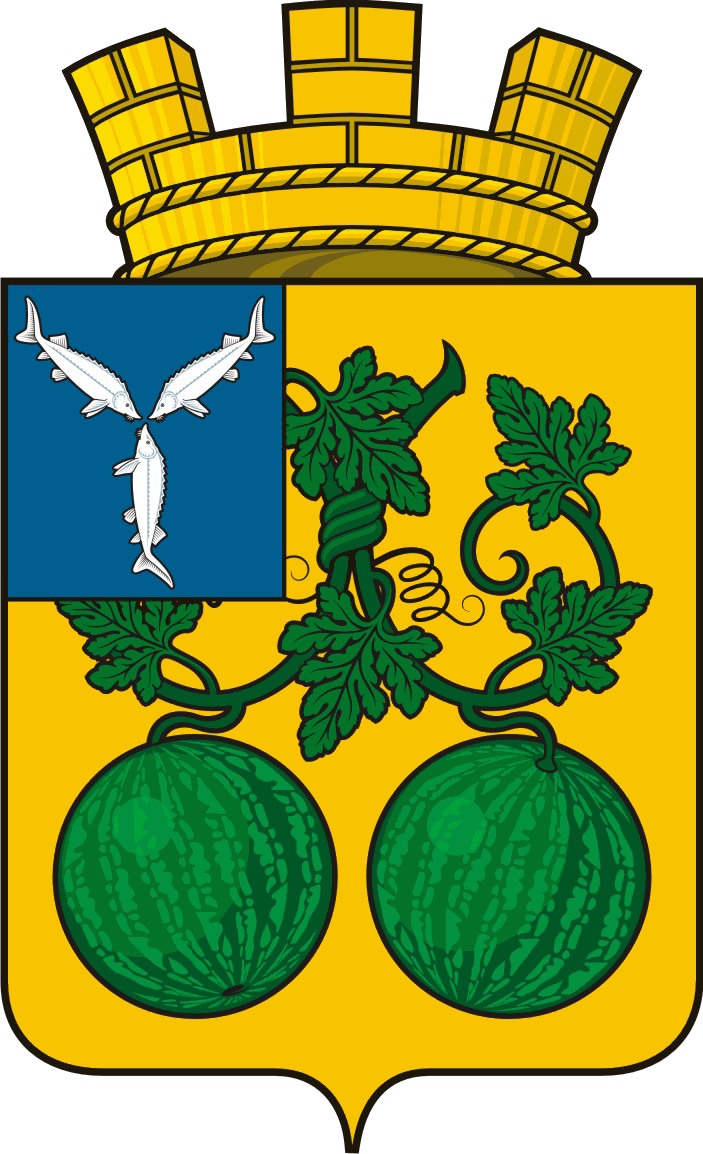
- Flag Coat of arms
- Interactive map of Balashov
- Location of Balashov Balashov (Saratov Oblast)
- Coordinates: 51°32′49″N 43°10′24″E
- Country: Russia
- Federal subject: Saratov Oblast
- Known since: the end of the 18th century
- Town status since: 1780
- Elevation: 140 m (460 ft)

Population (2010 Census)
  - Total: 82,227
  - Estimate (2025): 71,959 (−12.5%)
  - Rank: 201st in 2010

Administrative status
  - Subordinated to: Balashov Town Under Oblast Jurisdiction
  - Capital of: Balashovsky District, Balashov Town Under Oblast Jurisdiction

Municipal status
  - Municipal district: Balashovsky Municipal District
  - Urban settlement: Balashov Urban Settlement
  - Capital of: Balashovsky Municipal District, Balashov Urban Settlement
- Time zone: UTC+4 (MSK+1)
- Postal codes: 412300, 412302–412311, 412313–412316
- Dialing code: +7 84545
- OKTMO ID: 63608101001
- Website: balashovadmin.ru

Balashov (Russian: Балашо́в) is a town in Saratov Oblast, Russia, located on the Khopyor River. Population: 82,227 (2010 census); 98,330 (2002 census); 97,047 (1989 Soviet census). It was previously known as Balashovo (until 1780).

== History ==
It has been known as the selo of Balashovo (Балашово) since the end of the 18th century. In 1780, it was granted town status and became known as Balashov.

Between 1954 and 1957, it was the capital of the Balashov Oblast of Russian SFSR.

In 1966, the A. A. Leonov School of Young Cosmonauts (школа юных космонавтов имени А. А. Леонова) was opened here. Future pilots were trained in this school, and its pupils learned to fly an airplane

== Administrative and municipal status ==
Within the framework of administrative divisions, Balashov serves as the administrative center of Balashovsky District, even though it is not a part of it. As an administrative division, it is incorporated separately as Balashov Town Under Oblast Jurisdiction—an administrative unit with the status equal to that of the districts. As a municipal division, Balashov Town Under Oblast Jurisdiction is incorporated within Balashovsky Municipal District as Balashov Urban Settlement.

== Military ==
It was home to the Balashov air base.

== Geography ==
The town is located on the Khopyor River.

=== Climate ===
Balashov has a humid continental climate (Köppen climate classification Dfa) with long cold winters and warm, often hot summers.

Climate data for Balashov
Month	Jan	Feb	Mar	Apr	May	Jun	Jul	Aug	Sep	Oct	Nov	Dec	Year
Record high °C (°F)	7 (45)	8 (46)	19 (66)	31 (88)	34 (93)	39 (102)	40 (104)	39 (102)	34 (93)	26 (79)	18 (64)	10 (50)	40 (104)
Mean daily maximum °C (°F)	−4.5 (23.9)	−4.5 (23.9)	0.7 (33.3)	12.1 (53.8)	20.4 (68.7)	24.7 (76.5)	26.7 (80.1)	25.0 (77.0)	18.4 (65.1)	10.1 (50.2)	0.8 (33.4)	−4.0 (24.8)	10.6 (51.1)
Daily mean °C (°F)	−7.9 (17.8)	−8.3 (17.1)	−3.0 (26.6)	7.9 (46.2)	15.9 (60.6)	20.4 (68.7)	22.7 (72.9)	21.1 (70.0)	14.9 (58.8)	7.0 (44.6)	−1.7 (28.9)	−7.2 (19.0)	6.9 (44.4)
Mean daily minimum °C (°F)	−11.5 (11.3)	−12.4 (9.7)	−6.9 (19.6)	3.3 (37.9)	10.4 (50.7)	15.1 (59.2)	17.7 (63.9)	16.4 (61.5)	10.7 (51.3)	4.0 (39.2)	−4.1 (24.6)	−10.6 (12.9)	2.8 (37.0)
Record low °C (°F)	−38 (−36)	−36 (−33)	−33 (−27)	−17 (1)	−6 (21)	0 (32)	5 (41)	2 (36)	−6 (21)	−15 (5)	−27 (−17)	−34 (−29)	−38 (−36)
Average precipitation mm (inches)	41 (1.6)	31 (1.2)	29 (1.1)	33 (1.3)	37 (1.5)	63 (2.5)	64 (2.5)	44 (1.7)	49 (1.9)	39 (1.5)	48 (1.9)	47 (1.9)	525 (20.7)
Average precipitation days	14	9	8	6	8	8	10	6	8	7	12	15	111
Average rainy days	1	2	2	4	8	8	10	6	8	6	5	3	63
Average snowy days	13	8	6	2	0	0	0	0	0	2	7	13	51
Source 1: Saratov-meteo.ru
Source 2: Weatherbase

== Notable people ==
- Yuri Garnaev, test-pilot
- Anatoly Vlasov, theoretical physicist prominent in the fields of statistical mechanics, kinetics, and especially in plasma physics.
