= Balashovsky District =

Balashovsky District Балашовский район (Russian)
- District
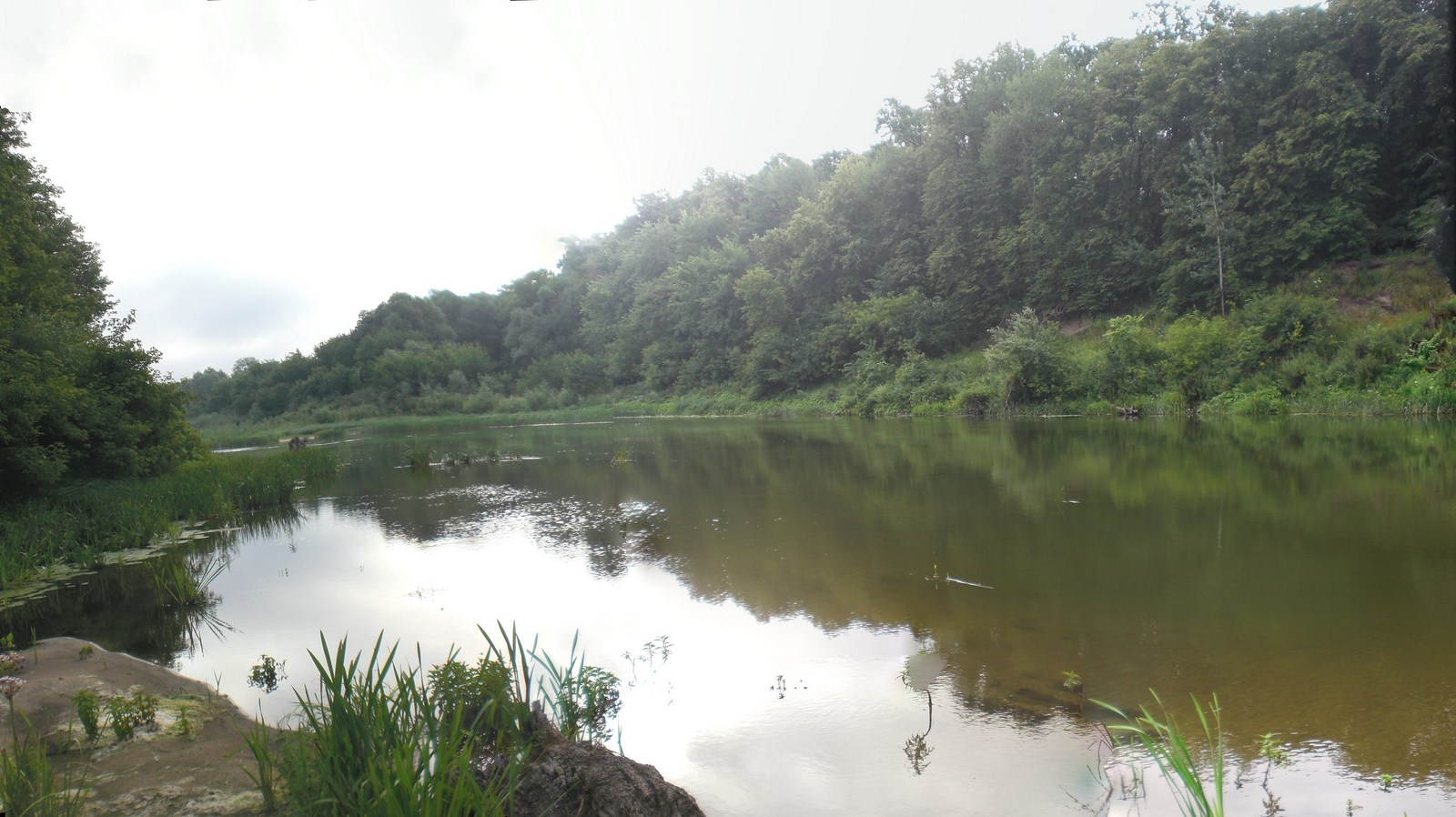
- Khoper River, Balashovsky District

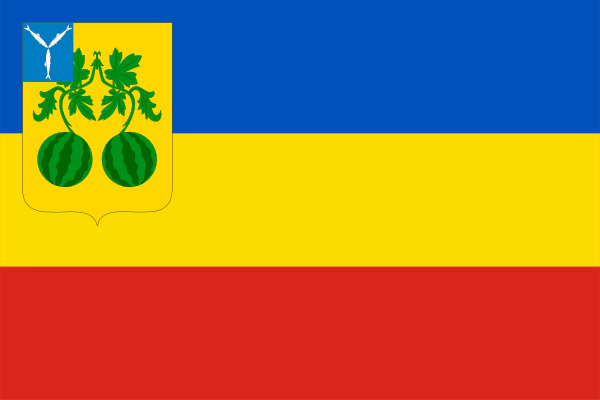
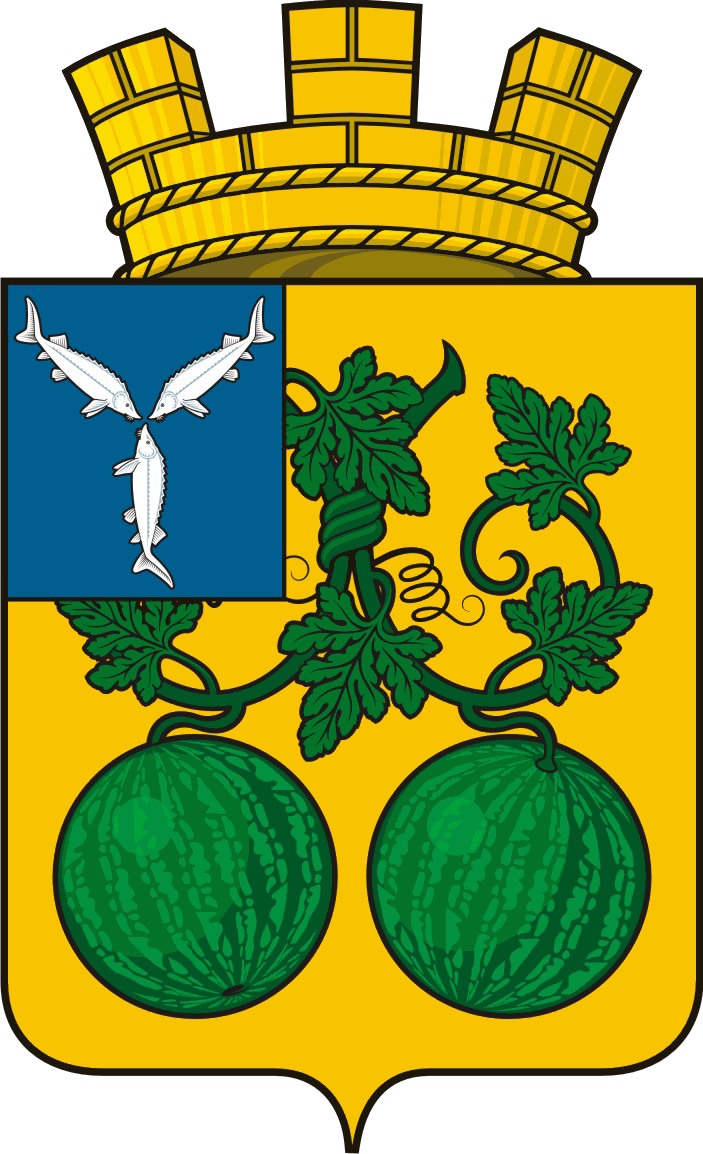
- Flag Coat of arms
- Location of Balashovsky District in Saratov Oblast
- Coordinates: 51°33′N 43°10′E
- Country: Russia
- Federal subject: Saratov Oblast
- Established: 23 July 1928
- Administrative center: Balashov

Area
  - Total: 2,924.56 km^{2} (1,129.18 sq mi)

Population (2010 Census)
  - Total: 31,125
  - Density: 10.643/km^{2} (27.564/sq mi)
  - Urban: 11.1%
  - Rural: 88.9%

Administrative structure
  - Inhabited localities: 1 urban-type settlements, 60 rural localities

Municipal structure
  - Municipally incorporated as: Balashovsky Municipal District
  - Municipal divisions: 2 urban settlements, 14 rural settlements
- Time zone: UTC+4 (MSK+1)
- OKTMO ID: 63608000
- Website: http://baladmin.ru/

Balashovsky District (Russian: Балашовский райо́н) is an administrative and municipal district (raion), one of the thirty-eight in Saratov Oblast, Russia. It is located in the west of the oblast. The area of the district is 2,924.56 square kilometers (1,129.18 sq mi). Its administrative center is the town of Balashov (which is not administratively a part of the district). Population: 31,125 (2010 Census); 34,599 (2002 census); 33,835 (1989 Soviet census).

== Administrative and municipal status ==
Within the framework of administrative divisions, Balashovsky District is one of the thirty-eight in the oblast. The town of Balashov serves as its administrative center, despite being incorporated separately as a town under oblast jurisdiction—an administrative unit with the status equal to that of the districts.

As a municipal division, the district is incorporated as Balashovsky Municipal District, with Balashov Town Under Oblast Jurisdiction being incorporated within it as Balashov Urban Settlement.
