= Marksovsky District =

Marksovsky District Марксовский район (Russian)
- District
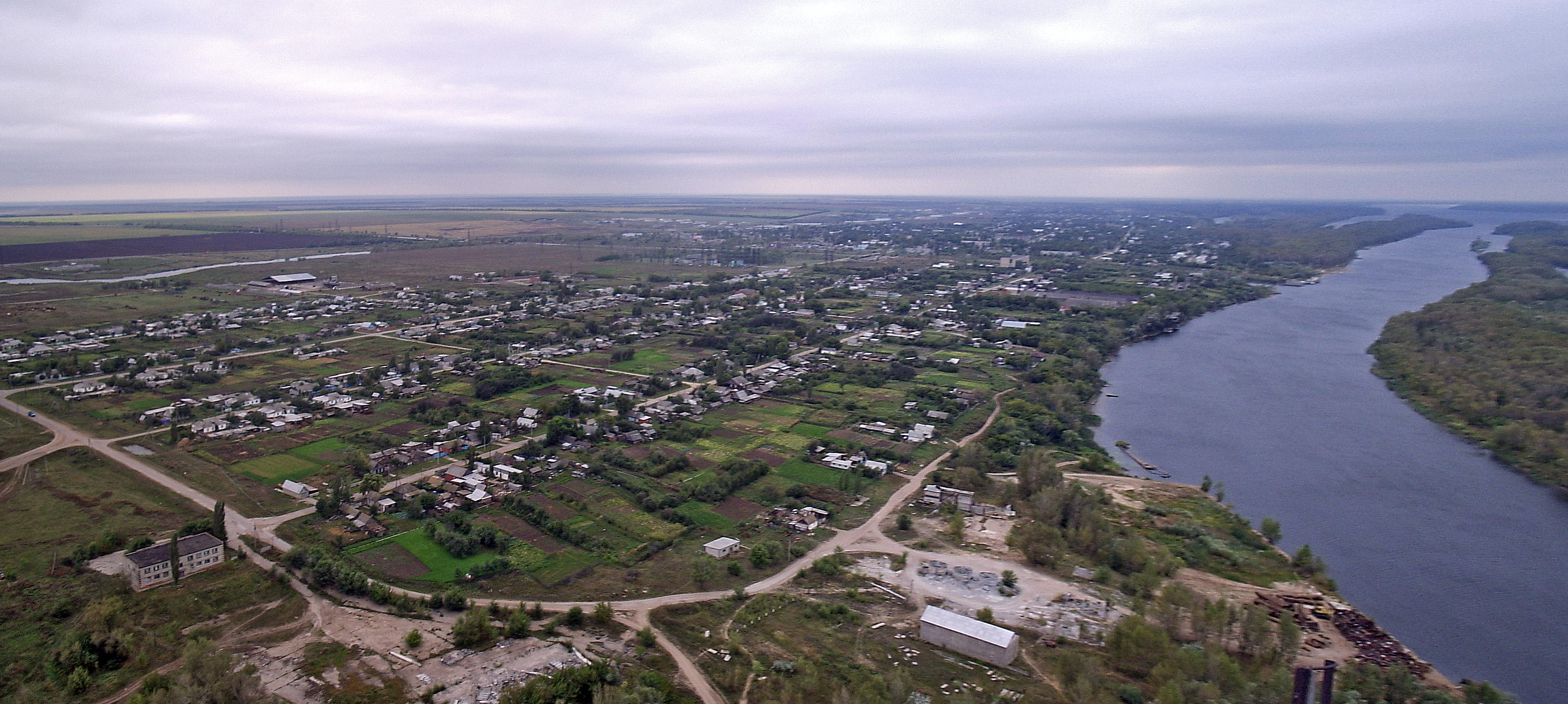
- Mikhaylovka, Marksovsky District

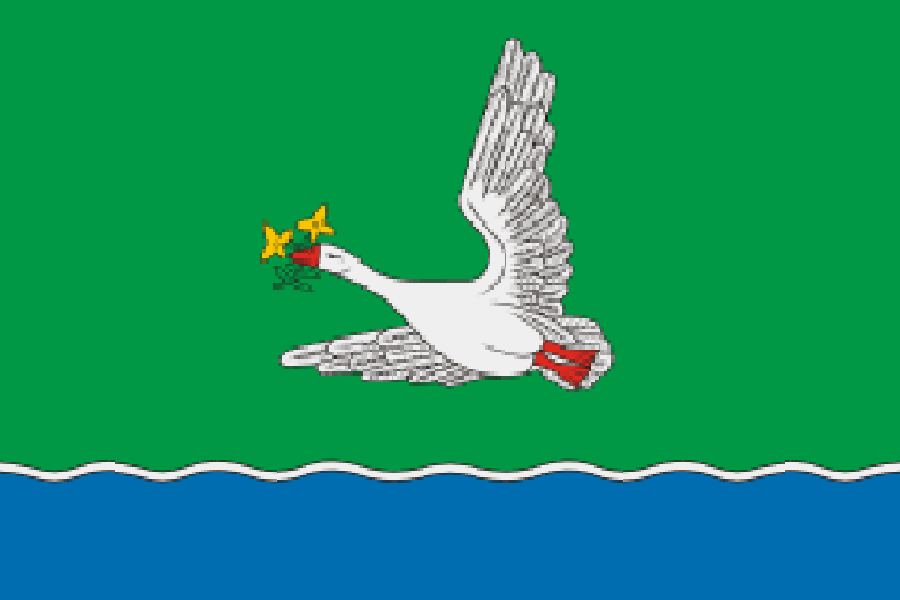
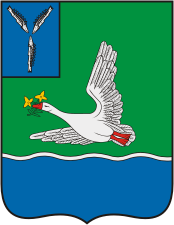
- Flag Coat of arms
- Location of Marksovsky District in Saratov Oblast
- Coordinates: 51°41′N 46°46′E
- Country: Russia
- Federal subject: Saratov Oblast
- Established: 7 September 1941
- Administrative center: Marks

Area
  - Total: 2,900 km^{2} (1,100 sq mi)

Population (2010 Census)
  - Total: 33,719
  - Density: 12/km^{2} (30/sq mi)
  - Urban: 0%
  - Rural: 100%

Administrative structure
  - Inhabited localities: 57 rural localities

Municipal structure
  - Municipally incorporated as: Marksovsky Municipal District
  - Municipal divisions: 1 urban settlements, 6 rural settlements
- Time zone: UTC+4 (MSK+1)
- OKTMO ID: 63626000
- Website: http://marksadm.ru/

Marksovsky District (Russian: Ма́рксовский райо́н) is an administrative and municipal district (raion), one of the thirty-eight in Saratov Oblast, Russia. It is located in the center of the oblast. The area of the district is 2,900 square kilometers (1,100 sq mi). Its administrative center is the town of Marks (which is not administratively a part of the district). Population: 33,719 (2010 Census); 34,216 (2002 census); 30,940 (1989 Soviet census).

== Administrative and municipal status ==
Within the framework of administrative divisions, Marksovsky District is one of the thirty-eight in the oblast. The town of Marks serves as its administrative center, despite being incorporated separately as a town under oblast jurisdiction—an administrative unit with the status equal to that of the districts.

As a municipal division, the district is incorporated as Marksovsky Municipal District, with Marks Town Under Oblast Jurisdiction being incorporated within it as Marks Urban Settlement.
