= Volsky District =

Volsky District Вольский район (Russian)
- District
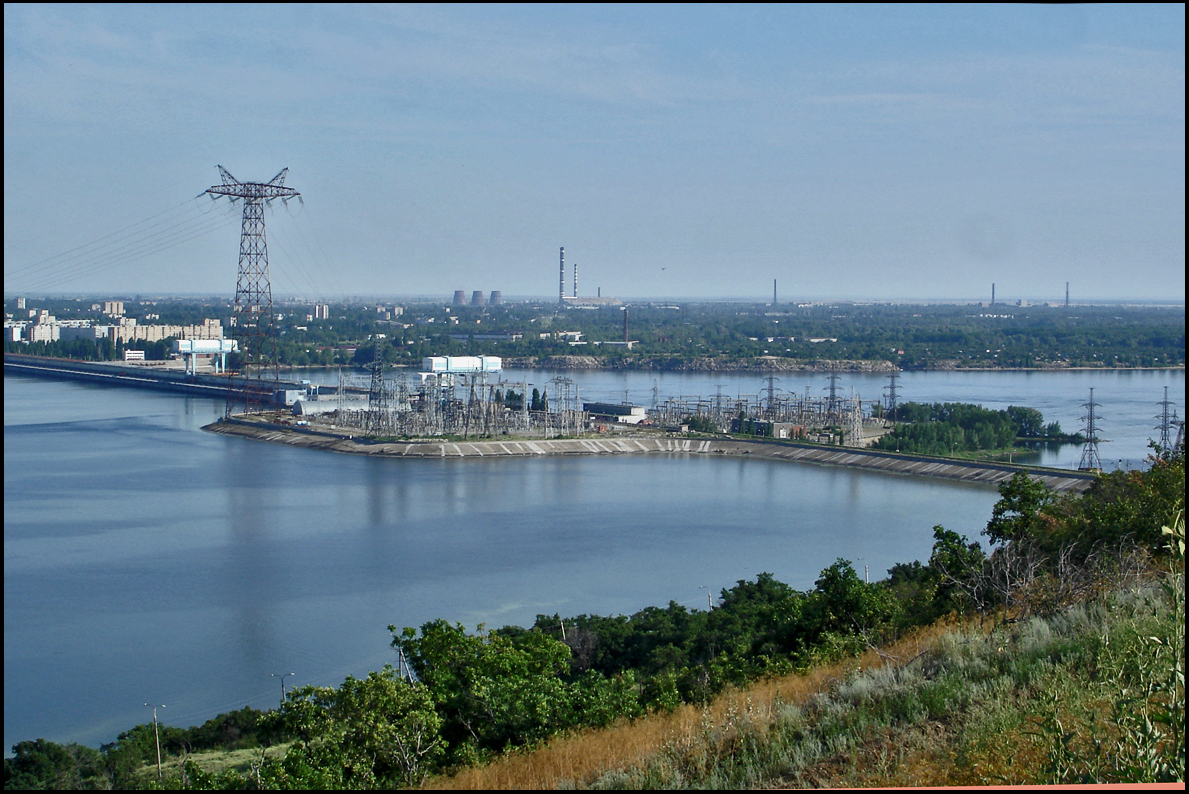
- Balakovo HPP, Volsky District

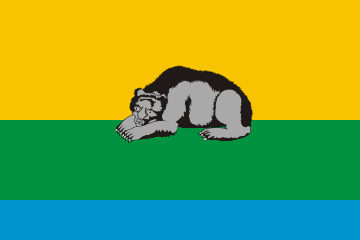
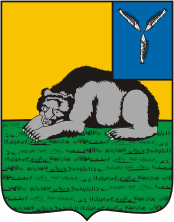
- Flag Coat of arms
- Location of Volsky District in Saratov Oblast
- Coordinates: 52°03′N 47°23′E
- Country: Russia
- Federal subject: Saratov Oblast
- Established: 23 July 1928
- Administrative center: Volsk

Area
  - Total: 3,700 km^{2} (1,400 sq mi)

Population (2010 Census)
  - Total: 27,457
  - Density: 7.4/km^{2} (19/sq mi)
  - Urban: 36.1%
  - Rural: 63.9%

Administrative structure
  - Inhabited localities: 1 urban-type settlements, 59 rural localities

Municipal structure
  - Municipally incorporated as: Volsky Municipal District
  - Municipal divisions: 2 urban settlements, 13 rural settlements
- Time zone: UTC+4 (MSK+1)
- OKTMO ID: 63611000
- Website: http://xn--b1aqclq9d.xn--p1ai/

Volsky District (Russian: Во́льский райо́н) is an administrative and municipal district (raion), one of the thirty-eight in Saratov Oblast, Russia. It is located in the north of the oblast. The area of the district is 3,700 square kilometers (1,400 sq mi). Its administrative center is the town of Volsk (which is not administratively a part of the district). Population: 27,457 (2010 Census); 29,977 (2002 census); 34,174 (1989 Soviet census).

== Administrative and municipal status ==
Within the framework of administrative divisions, Volsky District is one of the thirty-eight in the oblast. The town of Volsk serves as its administrative center, despite being incorporated separately as a town under oblast jurisdiction—an administrative unit with the status equal to that of the districts (and which, in addition to Khvalynsk, also includes one urban-type settlement and three rural localities).

As a municipal division, the district is incorporated as Volsky Municipal District, with Volsk Town Under Oblast Jurisdiction being incorporated within it as Volsk Urban Settlement.
