= Saratovsky District =

Saratovsky District Саратовский район (Russian)
- District
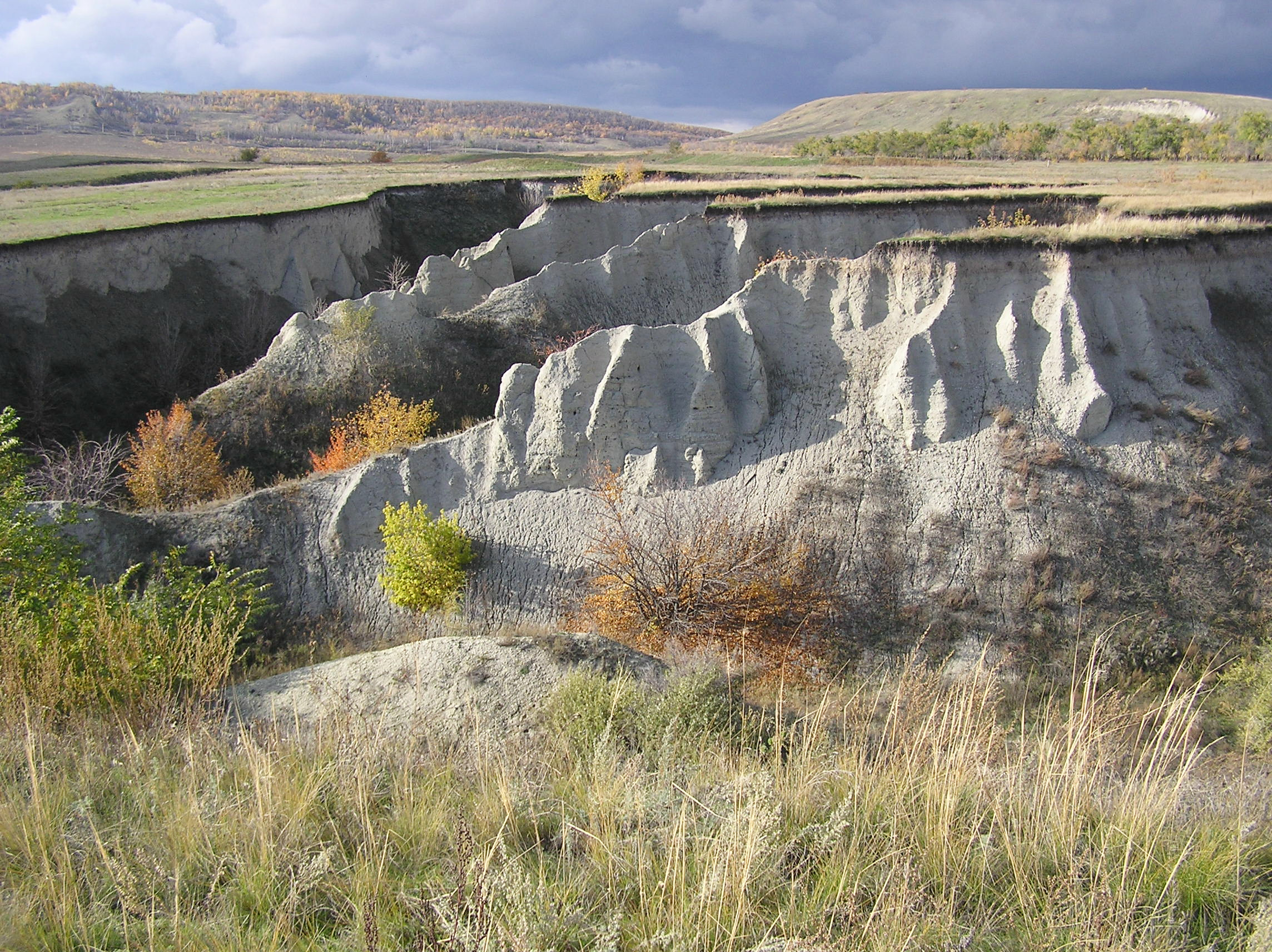
- Budanova Gora (a gully), Saratovsky District

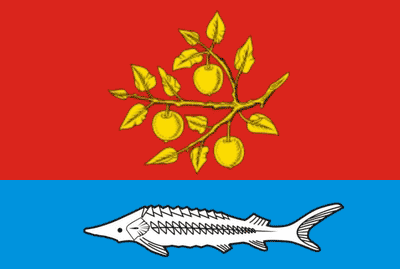
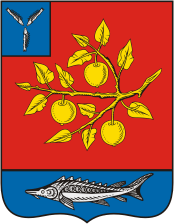
- Flag Coat of arms
- Location of Saratovsky District in Saratov Oblast
- Coordinates: 51°33′N 46°00′E
- Country: Russia
- Federal subject: Saratov Oblast
- Established: 23 July 1928
- Administrative center: Saratov

Area
  - Total: 1,900 km^{2} (730 sq mi)

Population (2010 Census)
  - Total: 48,105
  - Density: 25/km^{2} (66/sq mi)
  - Urban: 26.4%
  - Rural: 73.6%

Administrative structure
  - Inhabited localities: 2 urban-type settlements, 77 rural localities

Municipal structure
  - Municipally incorporated as: Saratovsky Municipal District
  - Municipal divisions: 2 urban settlements, 10 rural settlements
- Time zone: UTC+4 (MSK+1)
- OKTMO ID: 63643000
- Website: http://saratov.sarmo.ru/

Saratovsky District (Russian: Сара́товский райо́н) is a former administrative and municipal district (raion), one of the thirty-eight in Saratov Oblast, Russia. On January 1, 2022, it was transformed into an administrative district; on May 13, 2022, it was renamed Gagarinsky District. It was located in the center of the oblast. The area of the district was 1,900 square kilometers (730 sq mi). Its administrative center was the city of Saratov (which is not administratively a part of the district). Population: 48,105 (2010 Census); 46,233 (2002 census); 45,252 (1989 Soviet census).

== Administrative and municipal status ==
Within the framework of administrative divisions, Saratovsky District is one of the thirty-eight in the oblast. The city of Saratov serves as its administrative center, despite being incorporated separately as a city under oblast jurisdiction—an administrative unit with the status equal to that of the districts.

As a municipal division, the district is incorporated as Saratovsky Municipal District. Saratov City Under Oblast Jurisdiction is incorporated separately from the district as Saratov Urban Okrug.
