= Saratov Oblast =

First-level administrative division of Russia

Saratov Oblast Саратовская область (Russian)
- Oblast
- Flag Coat of arms

- Coordinates: 51°47′N 46°44′E
- Country: Russia
- Federal district: Volga
- Economic region: Volga
- Established: December 5, 1936
- Administrative center: Saratov

Government
  - Body: Oblast Duma
  - Governor: Roman Busargin

Area
  - Total: 101,240 km^{2} (39,090 sq mi)
  - Rank: 36th

Population (2021 census)
  - Total: 2,442,575 ▼: 87.6% Russians; 3.1% Kazakhs; 2.2% Tatars; 1.7% Ukrainians; 1% Armenians; 2.6% other
  - Estimate (2018): 2,462,950
  - Rank: 19th
  - Density: 24.127/km^{2} (62.488/sq mi)
  - Urban: 76.6%
  - Rural: 23.4%

GDP (nominal, 2024)
  - Total: ₽1.54 trillion (US$18.01 billion)
  - Per capita: ₽645,768 (US$7,577.57)
- Time zone: UTC+4 (MSK+1)
- ISO 3166 code: RU-SAR
- License plates: 64, 164
- OKTMO ID: 63000000
- Official languages: Russian
- Website: http://saratov.gov.ru/

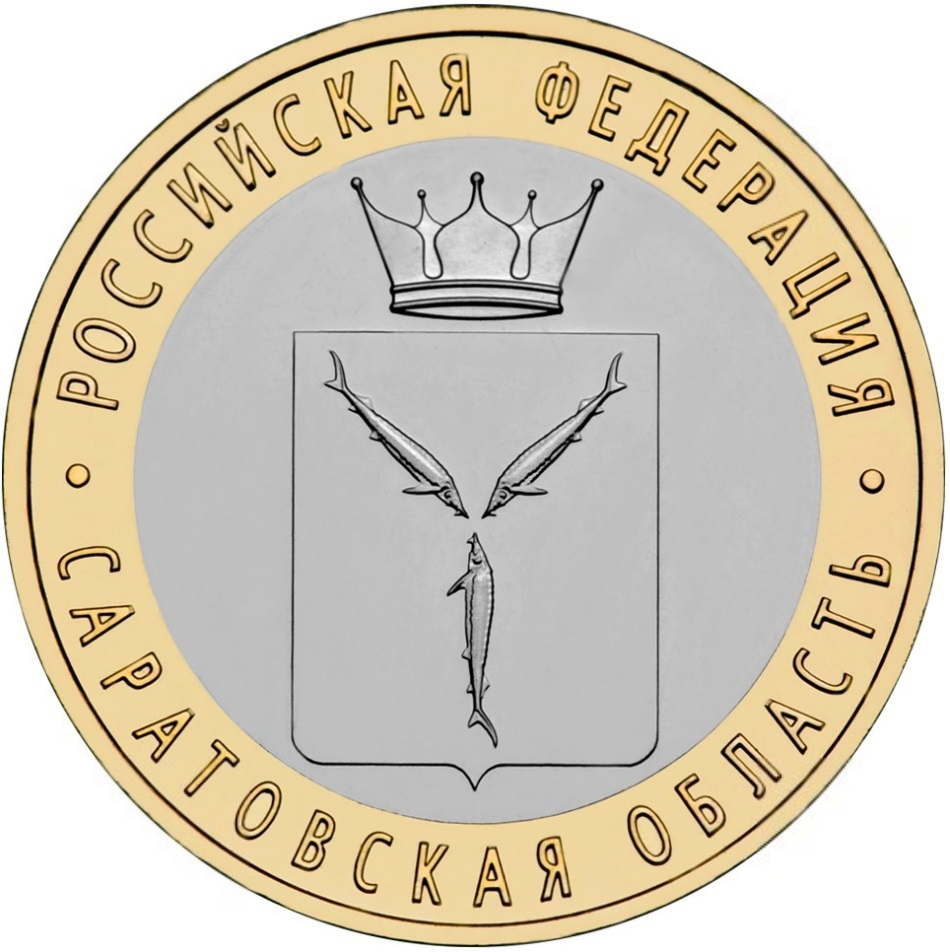
Commemorative coin of the Bank of Russia with a face value of 10 rubles (2014)

Saratov Oblast (Note: Russian: Сара́товская о́бласть, romanized: Saratovskaya oblastʹ, pronounced [sɐˈratəfskəjə ˈobləsʲtʲ]) is a federal subject of Russia (an oblast), located in the Volga Federal District. Its administrative center is the city of Saratov. As of the 2021 Census, its population was 2,442,575.

== Geography ==
The oblast is located in the southeast of European Russia, in the northern part of the Lower Volga region. From west to east its territory stretches for 575 kilometers (357 mi), and from north to south for 330 kilometers (210 mi). The highest point of Saratov Oblast is an unnamed hill of the Khvalynsk Mountains reaching 369 metres (1,211 ft) above sea level.

The oblast borders on:

- Volgograd Oblast to the south
- Voronezh and Tambov oblasts to the west
- Penza, Samara and Ulyanovsk oblasts to the north;
- Kazakhstan (West Kazakhstan Region) to the east

=== Natural resources ===
Of particular agricultural importance are valuable agricultural ordinary and southern chernozyom areas; chestnut soils are widespread. The oblast has many water resources: besides the river Volga (which divides the oblast in two) there are many identified sources and mineral-water deposits.

=== Minerals ===
More than 40 small oil and gas fields have been explored in the region, with the unexplored part of the promising areas being unexplored. Explored a lot of oil shale deposits, including a large Ozinskoye, deposits of quality cement raw materials, phosphorites, construction, ballast and glass sands, construction clay and stone.

=== Climate ===
The climate in the region is temperate: a long dry hot summer, on the left bank of Volga river a considerable number of days with a temperature above +30 °C (86 °F). Winter is frosty, the average number of days with precipitation is 12–15 per month, with fogs an average of 4–10 days per month, With snowstorms – an average of 4–10 days a month. Spring is short. In March, snowstorms, drifts on roads, an average of 5–7 days are possible. Days with fogs in March averaged 5–9. In the spring, usually with the last decade of March to the third decade of April, a limit is imposed on the roads with a hard surface on the movement of heavy vehicles, the beginning of which is timed to the transition of the average daily temperature through 0. Autumn does not differ from year to year by the constancy of the weather. A stable snow cover is created in the northern regions by November 25, and in the central and southern regions – from November 29 to December 8. The region crosses the climatic separating and wind-destroying Voeykov axis, it passes on average through the eastern and northern regions of the region, sometimes falling to the south, and also to the border of the forest and forest-steppe zones, which goes northwards, especially in the spring, which affects the climate of the region.

=== Ecology ===
The modern ecological state of the Saratov oblast is critical. Intensive pollution of the environment continues as production increases. The fuel, chemical and petrochemical industries are developing more dynamically than the average for Russia. The foreign trade turnover of the Saratov region in 2011 increased by 36.8%. The basis of exports is the products of the fuel and energy and petrochemical complex. Products of machine building continue to be delivered to the countries of the near abroad. Simultaneously with the economic growth of the region, environmental damage is also increasing. To date, the ecological state of the Saratov oblast is not improving. Measures are not taken to stop negative environmental impacts, prevent uncontrolled impacts (such as accidents, uncontrolled emissions, which can lead not only to disasters of a local nature, but also to a larger scale). All marked negative manifestations occur against the background of dangerous natural processes: landslides, karst, earthquakes, flooding. To solve a whole range of environmental problems, the Committee for Environmental Protection and Nature Management of the Saratov oblast developed the "Program for Stabilization and Improvement of the Ecological Situation in the Territory of the Saratov oblast", which was based on the proposals of the administrations of cities and districts of the region, city district environmental committees, enterprises and organizations Region. The program is financed from budgets of different levels, funds of environmental funds, enterprises and organizations of the region. As a result, the volume of capital expenditures aimed at protecting the environment of the region increased due to all sources of financing. Objects of the public are unknown.

In the dumps and storehouses of enterprises in the Saratov oblast is located 24 million tons of industrial waste:

- 1 class of danger – 3,5 thousand tons; ("Tantalus", "Banner of Labor", "SAZ", "AIT", "ELMASH", "SEPO"),
- 2 class of danger – about 5 thousand tons;
- 3 class of danger – about 3 million tons;
- 4 class of danger – about 21 million tons.

In 1998, about 1.5 million tons of industrial wastes of 1–4 hazard classes were formed in the region, about 2 million tons of solid household waste. Compared to 1997, there was a decrease in the gross volume of industrial waste generation by 11%, which is associated with a fall in production volumes.

A particularly dangerous enterprise in Saratov is the AIT plant, which pollutes not only its own territory, but also the adjacent residential area. This enterprise for a long time exported to the dump of the Alexander Village Soviet production waste containing nickel and cadmium.

In dumps in the amount of more than 19 million tons (with a design capacity of 10.84 million tons) phosphogypsum from the production activity of Irgiz OJSC in Balakovo has been accumulated. Here the pollution is tens of times higher than the maximum permissible concentration for phosphates, chlorides, iron, ammonia and nitrates.

One of the most pressing problems is the problem of collection and disposal of technical and domestic garbage. The number of unauthorized landfills is growing. For today, the administrations of municipal entities and the Government of the Saratov oblast are not controlled or monitored in any way. The only measure is a one-time garbage collection in the territories of municipalities, initiated by public organizations of the Saratov region and "subbotniks", which are held in the spring and autumn.

=== Ecological state of the atmosphere ===
Annually, Saratov enterprises emit up to 50 million tons of harmful substances into the atmosphere. These include carbon monoxide, nitrogen oxides, sulfur dioxide, hydrocarbons, aldehydes, heavy metals, ammonia, and atmospheric dust.

The main sources of anthropogenic aerosol air pollution are thermal power plants (CHPs) that consume coal. Combustion of coal, cement production and smelting of cast iron give a total dust emission to the atmosphere equal to 170 million tons per year.

In 2011, Saratov was excluded from the list of Russian cities with very high levels of air pollution.

=== Seismic activity ===
Historical and modern earthquakes are known in the region. The level of seismic activity in the territory of the region, according to the officially published map of the general seismic zoning of the territory of the Russian Federation (OSR-97-C), is determined by the probability of earthquakes with an intensity of up to 7 points inclusive on the Medvedev–Sponheuer–Karnik scale.

== History ==
=== Prehistoric period ===
By the time of the Paleolithic in the territory of the Saratov oblast are the parking near the village of Aryash Novoburassky district and near the settlement Nepryakhin of the Ozinsky district.

Two male skulls from the cemetery of Khlopkov Bugor belong to the era of the Eneolithic. A single barrow Panitsky 6B in the Krasnoarmeysky district has a dating of the end of the IV – beginning. III millennium BC. By the town Khvalynsk was called the Eneolithic Khvalynsk culture (V-IV thousand BC.).

=== Golden Horde and the Kazan Khanate ===
In the middle of the 13th century prisoners captured by the Mongols from various conquered countries built one of the first and largest cities of the Golden Horde, Uvek, in the area of modern Saratov (Marco Polo tells of the Venetians visiting the city in 1262). In 1334, the Arab traveler Ibn Battuta visited it and recorded that Ukek is a city of "average size, but beautifully built, with abundant benefits and severe cold". At the end of the 14th century, the city was destroyed by Tamerlane.

In the next 200 years, a rare population of the Wild Fields was represented by the Nogais, and then by the Kalmyk nomad camps, Cossacks and fishing co-operatives of Russian monasteries. In the meantime, after the collapse of the Golden Horde, the Kazan Khanate was formed on the territory of the Kazan ulus, which in 1552 was conquered by the Russian Tsar Ivan IV.

=== Tsardom of Russia and the Russian Empire ===
After the capture of Kazan and the territorial-state reform of Peter I in 1708, the conquered Kazan Khanate became the so-called formally independent Kazan tsardom in union with the Russian State. In 1708 the Kazan tsardom was transformed into the Kazan Governorate. In 1717, the Astrakhan Governorate was separated from it.

On December 25, 1769, the Saratov Province of the Astrakhan Governorate was created. On January 11, 1780 Empress Catherine II issued a decree establishing the Saratov viceregency from the northern districts of the Astrakhan Governorate (Saratov, Khvalynsky, Volsky, Kuznetsky, Serdobsky, Atkarskiy, Petrovsky, Balashov and Kamyshinsky). By decree of Emperor Paul I of December 12, 1796, the Saratov Viceroyalty was abolished, and its counties were divided between the Penza and Astrakhan Governorates.

Between the autumn of 1891 through the summer of 1892, the territory of the Saratov Governorate became part of the main zone of crop failure caused by drought (see Russian famine of 1891–92).

=== Soviet Union ===
In 1918, part of the territory of the Saratov Governorate was included in the newly formed autonomous region of the Germans in the Volga region. In 1928, the province was disbanded, and its territory became part of the Lower Volga oblast, soon transformed into the Lower Volga krai.

January 10, 1934 the Lower Volga krai was divided into Saratov and Stalingrad krais. According to the Constitution of the USSR, adopted on December 5, 1936, the Saratov krai was reorganized into the Saratov oblast, with the creation of the Volga German Autonomous Soviet Socialist Republic.

By the decree of the Presidium of the Supreme Soviet of the USSR on September 7, 1941, in Saratov oblast were included the territories of 15 cantons of the former Volga German Autonomous Soviet Socialist Republic (Balzer, Zolotovsky, Kamensk, Ternovsky, Kukkus, Zelman, Krasnoyarsk, Marksstadt, Untervalden, Fedorov, Gnadenfly, Krasno-Kutsky, Lysanderzhsky, Mariental and Eckheim).

After the abolition of the Balashov oblast by the Decree of the Presidium of the Supreme Soviet of the RSFSR of November 19, 1957, these cities and districts were returned to the Saratov region. Part of Saratov Region was held by Germany in 1942—3.

=== Modern history ===
On 4 July 1997, Saratov, alongside Bryansk, Chelyabinsk, Magadan, and Vologda signed a power-sharing agreement with the government of Russia, granting it autonomy. The agreement was abolished on 9 February 2002.

== Politics ==
During the Soviet period, the high authority in the oblast was shared between three persons: The first secretary of the Saratov CPSU Committee (who in reality had the most authority), the chairman of the oblast Soviet (legislative power), and the Chairman of the oblast Executive Committee (executive power). In 1991, the CPSU lost all its power, and the head of the Oblast administration, and eventually the governor was appointed or elected alongside elected the regional parliament.

The Charter of Saratov Oblast is the fundamental law of the oblast. The Legislative Assembly of Saratov Oblast is the province's standing legislative (representative) body. The Legislative Assembly exercises its authority by passing laws, resolutions, and other legal acts and by supervising the implementation and observance of the laws and other legal acts it passes. The highest executive body is the Oblast Government, which includes territorial executive bodies such as district administrations, committees, and commissions that facilitate development and run the day-to-day matters of the province. The Oblast administration supports the activities of the Governor who is the highest official and acts as guarantor of the observance of the oblast Charter in accordance with the Constitution of Russia.

== Demographics ==
Historical population
Year	Pop.	±%
1897	2,405,829	—
1926	3,021,937	+25.6%
1959	2,162,751	−28.4%
1970	2,454,083	+13.5%
1979	2,559,977	+4.3%
1989	2,686,483	+4.9%
2002	2,668,310	−0.7%
2010	2,521,892	−5.5%
2021	2,442,575	−3.1%
Source: Census data

Population: 2,442,575 (2021 census); 2,521,892 (2010 census); 2,668,310 (2002 census); 2,686,483 (1989 Soviet census).

Vital statistics for 2024:

- Births: 14,815 (6.2 per 1,000)
- Deaths: 33,528 (14.1 per 1,000)

Total fertility rate (2024):
1.06 children per woman

Life expectancy (2021):
Total — 69.08 years (male — 64.84, female — 73.18)

Ethnic groups: most of the ethnic Germans who used to live in the area were repatriated. The German Consulate in Saratov closed in June 2004, stating that there were only 18,000 ethnic Germans left in the oblast (including 2,000 in the city of Saratov).

There were twenty recognized ethnic groups of more than two thousand persons each in Saratov Oblast at the time of the 2010 Census. The ethnic composition was reported to be:

- Russians: 87.55%;
- Kazakhs: 3.09%;
- Tatars: 2.15%;
- Ukrainians: 1.71%;
- Armenians: 0.97%;
- Azerbaijani: 0.60%;
- Chuvash: 0.50%;
- Mordovians: 0.44%;
- Belarusians: 0.34%;
- Germans: 0.31%;
- Chechens: 0.23%;
- Lezgins: 0.21%
- 64,878 people were registered from administrative databases, and could not declare an ethnicity. It is estimated that the proportion of ethnicities in this group is the same as that of the declared group.

=== Settlements ===
Largest cities or towns in Saratov Oblast 2021 Russian Census
Rank		Administrative Division	Pop.
1	Saratov	Saratovsky District	901,361
2	Engels	Engelssky District	225,428
3	Balakovo	Balakovsky District	184,466
4	Balashov	Balashovsky District	74,057
5	Volsk	Volsky District	55,035
6	Pugachyov	Pugachyovsky District	40,127
7	Rtishchevo	Rtishchevsky District	37,850
8	Privolzhsky	Engelssky District	33,096
9	Marks	Marksovsky District	28,749
10	Petrovsk	Petrovsky District	26,319

=== Religion ===
Religion in Saratov Oblast as of 2012 (Sreda Arena Atlas)
Russian Orthodoxy	30%
Other Orthodox	1%
Other Christians	4.8%
Islam	2.4%
Hinduism	0.5%
Rodnovery and other native faiths	1.1%
Spiritual but not religious	38.1%
Atheism and irreligion	15.6%
Other and undeclared	6.5%

According to a 2012 survey 30% of the population of Saratov Oblast adheres to the Russian Orthodox Church, 4% are unaffiliated generic Christians, 1% are Orthodox Christians who believe but aren't members of any church or are members of non-Russian Orthodox churches. 2% are Muslims, 1% of the population adheres to Rodnovery (Slavic folk religion), and 0.5% adheres to forms of Hinduism (Vedism, Krishnaism or Tantrism). In addition, 38% of the population declares to be "spiritual but not religious", 16% is atheist, and 7.5% follows other religions or did not give an answer to the question.

== See also ==
- Volga German Autonomous Soviet Socialist Republic
- Upper Saviour–Transfiguration Monastery
