= Samara Time =

Time zone in Russia (UTC+4)

- Time zone

UTC offset
- SAMT: UTC+04:00

Current time
- 17:04, 25 March 2026 SAMT [refresh]

Observance of DST
- DST is not observed in this time zone.

Time in Russia: KALT / Kaliningrad Time / UTC+2 / (MSK−1); MSK / Moscow Time / UTC+3 / (MSK±0); SAMT / Samara Time / UTC+4 / (MSK+1); YEKT / Yekaterinburg Time / UTC+5 / (MSK+2); OMST / Omsk Time / UTC+6 / (MSK+3); KRAT / Krasnoyarsk Time / UTC+7 / (MSK+4); IRKT / Irkutsk Time / UTC+8 / (MSK+5); YAKT / Yakutsk Time / UTC+9 / (MSK+6); VLAT / Vladivostok Time / UTC+10 / (MSK+7); MAGT / Magadan Time / UTC+11 / (MSK+8); PETT / Kamchatka Time / UTC+12 / (MSK+9)

Samara Time (SAMT) is the time zone four hours ahead of UTC (UTC+4) and 1 hour ahead of Moscow Time (MSK+1). Samara Time is used in Astrakhan Oblast, Samara Oblast, Saratov Oblast, Udmurtia, and Ulyanovsk Oblast.

== History ==
Until a reform on 28 March 2010, Samara Time was UTC+4 in winter and Samara Summer Time (SAMST) was UTC+5 in summer. From that date, Samara Time was abolished with the two regions effectively joining Moscow Summer Time. In March 2011, Moscow time was moved forward to UTC+04:00 year-round, and Samara Time was reinstated on 26 October 2014, when Moscow time moved back one hour to UTC+03:00 year-round and Samara Oblast and Udmurtia remained on UTC+04:00.

On 27 March 2016, Ulyanovsk Oblast and Astrakhan Oblast switched to Samara Time by moving the clock 1 hour forwards from Moscow time. On 4 December 2016, Saratov Oblast also switched to Samara Time by moving forward 1 hour from Moscow time. On 28 October 2018, Volgograd Oblast also switched to Samara Time by moving forward 1 hour from Moscow time, but this change was reverted on 27 December 2020.

== IANA time zone database ==
In the zone.tab of the IANA time zone database, the zones with the same current offset are:

c.c.	Coordinates	Timezone name	Comments	UTC offset
RU	+4621+04803	Europe/Astrakhan	MSK+01 – Astrakhan	+04:00
RU	+5134+04602	Europe/Saratov	MSK+01 – Saratov	+04:00
RU	+5420+04824	Europe/Ulyanovsk	MSK+01 – Ulyanovsk	+04:00
RU	+5312+05009	Europe/Samara	MSK+01 – Samara, Udmurtia	+04:00
