= 2022 Moscow municipal elections =

Federal city elections in Russia

- 9–11 September 2022
- 1417 seats in the district municipal councils 709 seats needed for a majority
Party	Leader	Seats	+/–
United Russia	Aleksei Shaposhnikov	1160	+7
My Raion	Sergey Sobyanin	134	New
CPRF	Nikolay Zubrilin	42	−2
SRZP	Dmitry Gusev	20	+10
New People	Anna Trofimenko	20	New
LDPR	Dmitry Koshlakov-Krestovsky	12	+8
Yabloko	Sergey Ivanenko	3	−173
CPCR	Yaroslav Sidorov	1	+1
Independents	—	26	−82
This lists parties that won seats. See the complete results below.

The 2022 Moscow municipal elections took place in Moscow on 9–11 September 2022. Elections took place for deputies of the municipal councils in most of the districts of Moscow, for a total of at least 1,502 seats. Although the post of municipal council member is relatively powerless, candidates for mayor of Moscow are required to obtain support from municipal deputies to stand in elections.

== Last elections ==
Composition of the municipal council seats after the 2017 elections.

Composition of the municipal council seats by districts after the 2017 elections.

In 2017, in multiple districts in the center of Moscow, as well as some on the periphery of the city, the ruling party United Russia suffered defeats to opposition candidates, who received a combined total of nearly 20% of the seats. The opposition formed a coalition called United Democrats to get candidates elected to municipal councils of deputies.

Composition of the municipal council seats after the 2022 elections.

== Central Administrative Okrug ==
=== Arbat District ===
United Russia won the majority in the Council of Deputies and nearly doubled its faction from 5 to 9 seats; one seat was won by Communist Party. Yabloko lost its entire 4-member delegation.

Summary of the 9-11 September 2022 Arbat District Council of Deputies election in District 1
Candidate	Party	Votes	%
Viktoria Tiunova	United Russia	1,795	40.07%
Yulia Alimova	United Russia	1,765	39.40%
Vladimir Shamanin (incumbent)	United Russia	1,694	37.81%
Aleksey Budyonny	United Russia	1,539	34.35%
Yevgeny Babenko (incumbent)	United Russia	1,512	33.75%
Anton Alekseyev	Communist Party	1,102	24.60%
Viktor Mishin	Communist Party	1,047	23.37%
Andrey Volkov	Liberal Democratic Party	944	21.07%
Zoya Yershova	A Just Russia — For Truth	821	18.33%
Yevgeny Lobanov	A Just Russia — For Truth	714	15.94%
Ivan Sigorskikh	Independent	695	15.51%
Asel Rauff	Communist Party	615	13.73%
Total		4,480	100%

Summary of the 9-11 September 2022 Arbat District Council of Deputies election in District 2
Candidate	Party	Votes	%
Vera Yakovenko (incumbent)	United Russia	689	32.24%
Nikolay Kotov	Communist Party	669	31.31%
Anton Magonov	United Russia	597	27.94%
Olga Vizzhilina	United Russia	578	27.05%
Aleksey Zuyev	United Russia	498	23.30%
Irina Polegayeva	United Russia	485	22.70%
Olga Sidorovich	Independent	413	19.33%
Alina Buzhinskaya	Communist Party	405	18.95%
Sergey Kakitelashvili (incumbent)	Yabloko	405	18.95%
Tatyana Alyoshkina	Yabloko	395	18.48%
Natalya Pavlova	Independent	374	17.50%
Yelena Vonarshenko	Communist Party	283	13.24%
Olga Muravyeva	Communist Party	283	13.24%
Dmitry Lesnyak	New People	261	12.21%
Sergey Primak	Communist Party	212	9.92%
Vasily Zhigachev	New People	192	8.98%
Aleksandr Yakushin	New People	185	8.66%
Larisa Gorbacheva	A Just Russia — For Truth	167	7.81%
Nikolay Gushchin	Liberal Democratic Party	141	6.60%
Ilya Starodubtsev	New People	137	6.41%
Aleksandr Konovalov	Liberal Democratic Party	95	4.45%
Venera Khasanzyan	Liberal Democratic Party	56	2.62%
Total		2,137	100%

=== Basmanny District ===
United Russia retained control over the Council of Deputies with an increased majority of 10 seats, other 2 mandates were won by Communist Party candidates. Yabloko lost its entire 4-member delegation.

Summary of the 9-11 September 2022 Basmanny District Council of Deputies election in District 1
Candidate	Party	Votes	%
Anastasia Busygina	United Russia	1,953	36.97%
Ivan Melnikov	United Russia	1,832	34.68%
Olga Kosets	United Russia	1,561	29.55%
Pavel Ivanov	Communist Party	1,281	24.25%
Arsen Meloyan	United Russia	1,138	21.54%
Konstantin Boykov	Yabloko	1,015	19.21%
Ikar Shlegel	Yabloko	838	15.86%
Ramil Yakhin	Independent	771	14.59%
Aleksey Vakhurin	A Just Russia — For Truth	698	13.21%
Aleksandr Morkovkin	Communist Party	636	12.04%
Natalya Geraskina	Liberal Democratic Party	595	11.26%
Ivan Sazonov	New People	588	11.13%
Vladislav Zhukov	A Just Russia — For Truth	580	10.98%
Daniil Yegarmin	New People	476	9.01%
Ilyas Nigmatullin	Independent	467	8.84%
Anton Tokarev	Communist Party	409	7.74%
Yekaterina Nikitina	Communist Party	395	7.48%
Gennady Ponomarchuk	Liberal Democratic Party	329	6.23%
Total		5,283	100%

Summary of the 9-11 September 2022 Basmanny District Council of Deputies election in District 2
Candidate	Party	Votes	%
Aleksandr Likutov	United Russia	2,422	39.40%
Yulia Fomicheva (incumbent)	United Russia	2,301	37.43%
Veronika Bondar (incumbent)	United Russia	2,015	32.78%
Yelena Laktionova	United Russia	1,518	24.69%
Ivan Dorofeyev	Yabloko	986	16.04%
Kirill Anufriyev	New People	934	15.19%
Valeria Kuznetsova	Yabloko	925	15.05%
Irina Golubeva	Yabloko	907	14.76%
Denis Papin	Yabloko	821	13.36%
Mikhail Romanov	New People	737	11.99%
Anna Sokolova	New People	710	11.55%
Sergey Taran	A Just Russia — For Truth	705	11.47%
Dmitry Razenkov	Communist Party	585	9.52%
Inna Ovchinnikova	New People	508	8.26%
Anastasia Boyeva	Communist Party	504	8.20%
Inna Mikhaylova	A Just Russia — For Truth	449	7.30%
Yekaterina Grishina	Communist Party	403	6.56%
Maksim Rimsky	Communist Party	346	5.63%
Total		6,147	100%

Summary of the 9-11 September 2022 Basmanny District Council of Deputies election in District 3
Candidate	Party	Votes	%
Irina Abayeva	United Russia	2,432	40.81%
Viktor Meyer (incumbent)	United Russia	2,182	36.61%
Yelena Lukinova	United Russia	1,975	33.14%
Rasul Yagudov	Communist Party	1,770	29.70%
Oleg Eston (incumbent)	United Russia	1,485	24.92%
Tatyana Yerofeyeva	Communist Party	1,080	18.12%
Daniil Nesmelov	Yabloko	889	14.92%
Anastasia Gordeyeva	New People	875	14.68%
Milena Belyakova	Yabloko	845	14.18%
Natalia Nikolayeva	A Just Russia — For Truth	698	11.71%
Andrey O'Shannon	Communist Party	645	10.82%
Gleb Dubinin	Communist Party	572	9.60%
Andrey Maznev	A Just Russia — For Truth	470	7.89%
Timur Klychev	Liberal Democratic Party	373	6.26%
David Virobyan	A Just Russia — For Truth	253	4.24%
Total		5,960	100%

=== Khamovniki District ===
United Russia flipped control over the Council of Deputies from Yabloko winning 13 seats (from none in the previous convocation), meanwhile Yabloko lost all 9 seats. Communist Party retained its single member, joined by A Just Russia – For Truth candidate as the only opposition in the Council.

Summary of the 9-11 September 2022 Khamovniki District Council of Deputies election in District 1
Candidate	Party	Votes	%
Tatyana Alimova	United Russia	2,214	39.90%
Aleksey Vasilyev	United Russia	2,174	39.18%
Oleg Robinov	United Russia	1,565	28.20%
Vladimir Bogatenkov	United Russia	1,550	27.93%
Mikhail Starshinov	United Russia	1,145	20.63%
Kristina Chemeris	Communist Party	1,010	18.20%
Danil Usov	New People	992	17.88%
Oleg Dolgopolov	Communist Party	986	17.77%
Dmitry Molchanov	Communist Party	845	15.23%
Boris Nesterenko	Independent	803	14.47%
Konstantin Zhukov	Communist Party	776	13.98%
Yaroslav Gafurov	Independent	752	13.55%
Sergey Sinelnikov	Yabloko	751	13.53%
Aleksandr Khodyachy	Liberal Democratic Party	703	12.67%
Sofia Zhorova	New People	654	11.79%
Irina Kustova	Communist Party	621	11.19%
Anar Davidov	New People	603	10.87%
Marina Demyanenko	Liberal Democratic Party	467	8.42%
Sofya Kugeleva	Independent	439	7.91%
Yelena Kartseva	New People	438	7.89%
Total		5,549	100%

Summary of the 9-11 September 2022 Khamovniki District Council of Deputies election in District 2
Candidate	Party	Votes	%
Pavel Isachenkov	United Russia	2,032	38.07%
Anna Katkova	United Russia	1,793	33.60%
Vladimir Pakhomov	United Russia	1,779	33.33%
Nikolay Peshkov	United Russia	1,606	30.09%
Aleksey Syromyatnikov	United Russia	1,347	25.24%
Yevgeny Bocharov	Yabloko	1,288	24.13%
Yelena Seryogina	New People	986	18.47%
Anna Bogatyreva	Independent	857	16.06%
Stanislav Shmelyov	New People	818	15.33%
Oleg Burtsev	Communist Party	662	12.40%
Leonid Melnik	Communist Party	630	11.80%
Anastasia Dedyukhina	New People	582	10.91%
Sergey Kirillov	Communists of Russia	565	10.59%
Natalya Kalinina	Independent	556	10.42%
Ivan Kozlov	Communist Party	526	9.86%
Nikita Chechurin	Communist Party	488	9.14%
Diana Gafurova	New People	476	8.92%
Rinat Ramazanov	Liberal Democratic Party	407	7.63%
Aleksandr Gorelov	Independent	286	5.36%
Total		5,337	100%

Summary of the 9-11 September 2022 Khamovniki District Council of Deputies election in District 3
Candidate	Party	Votes	%
Andrey Voronkov (incumbent)	Communist Party	1,724	32.46%
Natalia Spirina	United Russia	1,724	32.46%
Andrey Golovko	United Russia	1,434	27.00%
Yury Berezkin	United Russia	1,244	23.42%
Inna Kovalevskaya	A Just Russia — For Truth	1,183	22.27%
Anna Vagurina	United Russia	1,177	22.16%
Aleksandr Melkumov (incumbent)	Independent	1,154	21.73%
Anastasia Gordiyenko	Independent	1,146	21.58%
Yelena Lyude	United Russia	1,131	21.30%
Aleksey Kalitvinov	Yabloko	952	17.93%
Artur Muratshin	Yabloko	599	11.28%
Leonid Bogomolov	Communist Party	594	11.18%
Maria Savateyeva	Independent	533	10.04%
Ilya Tikhomirov	Yabloko	490	9.23%
Igor Chudakov	Liberal Democratic Party	473	8.91%
Natalya Lunyova	Communist Party	392	7.38%
Serafima Chekulina	Communist Party	374	7.04%
Maksim Kats	Independent	366	6.89%
Svetlana Merkulova	Independent	356	6.70%
Vladimir Alekseyev	New People	347	6.53%
Darya Yevtyanova	New People	339	6.38%
Gennady Krasnopeyev	Communist Party	257	4.84%
Zakhar Melnikov	Yabloko	252	4.74%
Ilyas Kalmykov	New People	251	4.73%
Boris Starsky	Independent	226	4.26%
Total		5,311	100%

=== Krasnoselsky District ===
United Russia flipped control over the Council of Deputies from Solidarnost-aligned group of Independents led by Ilya Yashin winning 9 seats (up from three in the previous convocation). Communist Party won a single seat.

Summary of the 9-11 September 2022 Krasnoselsky District Council of Deputies election in District 1
Candidate	Party	Votes	%
Maksim Petrov	United Russia	1,867	49.43%
Sergey Ogorodnikov	United Russia	1,787	47.31%
Yelena Kachnova	United Russia	1,753	46.41%
Vitaly Stolyarov	United Russia	1,680	44.48%
Anna Rumyantseva	United Russia	1,356	35.90%
Artyom Komlichenko	New People	761	20.15%
Svetlana Danchuk	A Just Russia — For Truth	655	17.34%
Yelena Raykova	Liberal Democratic Party	569	15.06%
Pyotr Torbiyevsky	Liberal Democratic Party	563	14.91%
Nina Sats	A Just Russia — For Truth	490	12.97%
Mark Khabibullin	Independent	336	8.90%
Total		3,777	100%

Summary of the 9-11 September 2022 Krasnoselsky District Council of Deputies election in District 2
Candidate	Party	Votes	%
Yelena Shchetneva	United Russia	1,788	43.13%
Svetlana Dobrynina	United Russia	1,719	41.46%
Irina Glinova	United Russia	1,185	28.58%
Luiza Minyazeva	Communist Party	1,062	25.62%
Olga Pasko	United Russia	919	22.17%
Aleksandr Fetisov	United Russia	877	21.15%
Mikhail Strukov	A Just Russia — For Truth	687	16.57%
Yelena Kizhevatkina	Independent	626	15.10%
Ivan Bolshakov	A Just Russia — For Truth	610	14.71%
Roman Polosukhin	Independent	609	14.69%
Leyla Agarizayeva	Independent	529	12.76%
Fanil Valiyev	New People	517	12.47%
Vyacheslav Nizovtsev	Independent	506	12.20%
Aleksey Balmyshev	New People	389	9.38%
Mary Bur	New People	321	7.74%
Zukhra Balyayeva	New People	313	7.55%
Dmitry Butuzov	Independent	227	5.48%
Viktoria Kozlovskaya	Liberal Democratic Party	212	5.11%
Aleksandr Bandurin	Independent	167	4.03%
Aleksandr Kireyev	Independent	148	3.57%
Aleksey Khadykin	Liberal Democratic Party	156	3.76%
Oksana Khadykina	Liberal Democratic Party	137	3.30%
Total		4,146	100%

=== Meshchansky District ===
United Russia won all 10 seats in the Council of Deputies (up from 5) and flipped 3 seats held by Yabloko and two by Independents.

Summary of the 9-11 September 2022 Meshchansky District Council of Deputies election in District 1
Candidate	Party	Votes	%
Natalya Domracheva	United Russia	1,917	34.63%
Albert Iordanyan (incumbent)	United Russia	1,882	34.00%
Darya Starovoytova	United Russia	1,730	31.26%
Aleksandr Karakuts	United Russia	1,328	23.99%
Kristina Samsonenko	United Russia	1,217	21.99%
Aleksandr Zakuskin (incumbent)	Independent	1,156	20.89%
Alyona Samoshkina	New People	1,098	19.84%
Igor Panasenko (incumbent)	Independent	945	17.07%
Yegor Ignashov	Independent	876	15.83%
Ilya Myakinin	Yabloko	738	13.33%
Anatoly Bakin	New People	688	12.43%
Anatoly Klychkov	Yabloko	673	12.16%
Maksim Bekhtin	Communist Party	623	11.26%
Aleksey Pichugin	Communist Party	576	10.41%
Pavel Zhukov	New People	518	9.36%
Nikolay Nuzhdin-Belinsky	Communist Party	517	9.34%
Georgy Abanin	A Just Russia — For Truth	450	8.13%
Mikhail Moshkov	Liberal Democratic Party	443	8.00%
Aleksandr Dyagilev	New People	413	7.46%
Rafik Fattyakhetdinov	A Just Russia — For Truth	380	6.87%
Fyodor Andriyenko	Independent	302	5.46%
Total		5,535	100%

Summary of the 9-11 September 2022 Meshchansky District Council of Deputies election in District 2
Candidate	Party	Votes	%
Nadezhda Tolmacheva (incumbent)	United Russia	2,743	45.50%
Yelena Dmitriyeva	United Russia	2,294	38.05%
Aleksey Reteyum (incumbent)	United Russia	2,230	36.99%
Marina Demchenko	United Russia	2,105	34.91%
Aleksandr Bordik	United Russia	1,863	30.90%
Yelena Skorokhodova	A Just Russia — For Truth	1,857	30.80%
Aleksey Kolbeshkin	Liberal Democratic Party	990	16.42%
Ivan Klychkov	Yabloko	821	13.62%
Anton Boyev	Yabloko	773	12.82%
Ksenia Mynkina	New People	721	11.96%
Nikolay Polukeyev	Independent	627	10.40%
Vasily Orlenko	A Just Russia — For Truth	545	9.04%
Irina Borisova	Communist Party	530	8.79%
Ivan Belyayev	Independent	449	7.45%
Fyodor Chudin-Kurgan	Communist Party	432	7.17%
Sergey Starchuk	Communist Party	401	6.65%
Yury Bekhtin	Communist Party	365	6.05%
Yury Trusakov	Communist Party	338	5.61%
Irina Alyabyeva	Liberal Democratic Party	315	5.22%
Valery Makhankov	Liberal Democratic Party	286	4.74%
Total		6,029	100%

=== Presnensky District ===
United Russia flipped control the Council of Deputies from Independents winning 9 seats, while the renaming three went to Communist Party and 2 Independents.

Summary of the 9-11 September 2022 Presnensky District Council of Deputies election in District 1
Candidate	Party	Votes	%
Natalya Sklyarova	United Russia	1,855	37.28%
Roman Klimentyev	Communist Party	1,415	28.44%
Igor Stepanov	Independent	1,304	26.21%
Anatoly Yushin (incumbent)	New People	1,104	22.19%
Lyudmila Maliyeva	United Russia	1,031	20.72%
Artyom Akchurin	Liberal Democratic Party	992	19.94%
Viktoria Palgova (incumbent)	New People	971	19.51%
Mikhail Boltenkov	Communist Party	620	12.46%
Svetlana Velichko	Independent	565	11.35%
Aleksandr Mezentsev	New People	518	10.41%
Yelizaveta Pevcheva	A Just Russia — For Truth	393	7.90%
Andrey Smolyakov	A Just Russia — For Truth	298	5.99%
Konstantin Klimentyev	Independent	271	5.45%
Anton Mamsurov	A Just Russia — For Truth	262	5.27%
Total		4,976	100%

Summary of the 9-11 September 2022 Presnensky District Council of Deputies election in District 2
Candidate	Party	Votes	%
Anton Alekseyev (incumbent)	United Russia	2,116	40.57%
Dmitry Yumalin (incumbent)	United Russia	1,440	27.61%
Anna Budagyan	United Russia	1,235	23.68%
Yekaterina Iftodi	New People	1,074	20.59%
Konstantin Grechikhin	New People	1,031	19.77%
Marina Bogomolova	Communist Party	739	14.17%
Albert Yusupov	Communist Party	642	12.31%
Sergey Glubokov	A Just Russia — For Truth	589	11.29%
Aleksandr Zadoynov	Communist Party	541	10.37%
Natalya Kravchuk	Party of Russia's Rebirth	497	9.53%
Gurami Sanikidze	New People	447	8.57%
Maksim Ogradyuk	A Just Russia — For Truth	396	7.59%
Yury Bogatyrenko	Liberal Democratic Party	388	7.44%
Yelena Rybachenko	Liberal Democratic Party	382	7.32%
Aleksandr Gridnev	A Just Russia — For Truth	325	6.23%
Total		5,216	100%

Summary of the 9-11 September 2022 Presnensky District Council of Deputies election in District 3
Candidate	Party	Votes	%
Dmitry Yudin	United Russia	1,660	33.54%
Andrey Zarechnov	United Russia	1,587	32.06%
Ksenia Barbashina	United Russia	1,177	23.78%
Nikita Kulikov	Liberal Democratic Party	1,106	22.34%
Pavel Pupyrev	New People	857	17.31%
Yevgeny Dunilov	New People	807	16.30%
Gennady Babochkin	Communist Party	802	16.20%
Georgy Mikheyev	Communist Party	714	14.42%
Dmitry Demidov	Independent	683	13.80%
Sergey Mishin	A Just Russia — For Truth	590	11.92%
Vyacheslav Gazzayev	A Just Russia — For Truth	402	8.12%
Total		4,950	100%

Summary of the 9-11 September 2022 Presnensky District Council of Deputies election in District 4
Candidate	Party	Votes	%
Sergey Odintsov	United Russia	1,778	31.07%
Aleksey Chernykh	United Russia	1,772	30.96%
Svetlana Minka	Independent	1,497	26.16%
Golnaz Akhmetova (incumbent)	United Russia	1,446	25.27%
Natalia Shevchenko	Independent	831	14.52%
Marina Galkina	Liberal Democratic Party	792	13.84%
Yelizaveta Yakovats	A Just Russia — For Truth	684	11.95%
Dmitry Fokin	Communist Party	683	11.93%
Georgy Slyvus	New People	641	11.20%
Sergey Timofeyev	A Just Russia — For Truth	564	9.85%
Dmitry Shevkurov	Independent	445	7.78%
Violetta Kovresyeva	Communist Party	424	7.41%
Irina Plekhanova	A Just Russia — For Truth	722	7.37%
Total		5,723	100%

=== Tagansky District ===
United Russia retained control over the Council of Deputies, winning 8 seats out of 10.

Summary of the 9-11 September 2022 Tagansky District Council of Deputies election in District 1
Candidate	Party	Votes	%
Svetlana Goncharova	United Russia	4,492	37.97%
Ilya Sviridov (incumbent)	A Just Russia — For Truth	3,913	33.08%
Tatyana Troitskaya (incumbent)	United Russia	3,542	29.94%
Yelena Smirnova	United Russia	3,411	28.83%
Olga Cherezova (incumbent)	United Russia	3,315	28.02%
Leyla Dzhalilova	New People	2,432	20.56%
Natalia Abramova	A Just Russia — For Truth	1,968	16.64%
Nadezhda Salnikova	United Russia	1,794	15.16%
Anastasia Yemelyanova	A Just Russia — For Truth	1,588	13.42%
Maria Chuprina	Yabloko	1,568	13.25%
Vladimir Gorshkov-Kantakuzen	Yabloko	1,521	12.86%
Aleksandr Roshchin	Communist Party	1,172	9.91%
Valentina Lermontova	Communist Party	1,155	9.76%
Natalya Gorokhova	New People	1,134	9.59%
Olga Tygayeva	Communist Party	1,106	9.35%
Ilya Fedotov	Communist Party	987	8.34%
Yury Vaganov	Communist Party	950	8.03%
Aleksandr Agayan	Independent	858	7.25%
Tatyana Zhuravskaya	Liberal Democratic Party	794	6.71%
Mikhail Vorontsov	Independent	727	6.15%
Artyom Korobov	New People	725	6.13%
Andrey Zemlyannikov	New People	702	5.93%
David Kikava	A Just Russia — For Truth	595	5.03%
Viktoria Ovchinnikova	Independent	540	4.56%
Total		11,830	100%

Summary of the 9-11 September 2022 Tagansky District Council of Deputies election in District 2
Candidate	Party	Votes	%
Svetlana Bondareva (incumbent)	United Russia	4,782	39.90%
Tamara Gordzeyko (incumbent)	United Russia	4,121	34.38%
Karen Aperyan (incumbent)	United Russia	4,095	34.16%
Oleg Poddubnov	Communist Party	4,048	33.77%
Vladimir Kamenskikh	United Russia	3,918	32.69%
Aleksandr Zuyev (incumbent)	United Russia	3,513	29.31%
Ivan Maksimov	Communist Party	1,941	16.19%
Natalya Makarova (incumbent)	Yabloko	1,769	14.76%
Ivan Chukhnin	Communist Party	1,522	12.70%
Oleg Novikov	A Just Russia — For Truth	1,476	12.31%
Denis Vinogradov	A Just Russia — For Truth	1,255	10.47%
Vladislav Fetisov	Communist Party	1,202	10.03%
Galina Vasilyeva	A Just Russia — For Truth	1,159	9.67%
Taisia Afanasyeva	Independent	1,132	9.44%
Anatoly Kepchikov	New People	1,108	9.24%
Irina Gubanova	A Just Russia — For Truth	1,055	8.80%
Igor Pozdnyakov	A Just Russia — For Truth	871	7.27%
Yekaterina Nechayeva	Liberal Democratic Party	830	6.92%
Total		11,986	100%

=== Tverskoy District ===
United Russia flipped control over the Council of Deputies, winning 11 out of 12 seats (up from 1), while Yabloko lost its entire 10-seat delegation.

Summary of the 9-11 September 2022 Tverskoy District Council of Deputies election in District 1
Candidate	Party	Votes	%
Sergey Samsonov	United Russia	890	33.60%
Irina Simonova	United Russia	889	33.56%
Ivan Vlasenko	United Russia	766	28.92%
Mikhail Goncharenko	Independent	542	20.46%
Sergey Smirnov	Yabloko	522	19.71%
Nikita Gusev	New People	501	18.91%
Vitaly Davydov	Communist Party	342	12.91%
Aleksandr Zimin	Independent	285	10.76%
Aleksey Yefimov	New People	250	9.44%
Yaroslav Grinevsky	Communist Party	246	9.29%
Dmitry Tyurmin	New People	202	7.63%
Sergey Poteryayko	Communist Party	200	7.55%
Sergey Kochnov	A Just Russia — For Truth	145	5.47%
Sergey Zheleznov	Liberal Democratic Party	132	4.98%
Pavel Danilov	A Just Russia — For Truth	127	4.79%
Darina Leontyeva	A Just Russia — For Truth	110	4.15%
Total		2,649	100%

Summary of the 9-11 September 2022 Tverskoy District Council of Deputies election in District 2
Candidate	Party	Votes	%
Ketevan Kharaidze (incumbent)	Independent	862	27.77%
Yelena Shevtsova	United Russia	854	27.51%
Ayna Deniyeva	United Russia	660	21.26%
Igor Vorozhtsov	New People	640	20.62%
Yulianna Khetagurova	United Russia	592	19.07%
Marina Gretskaya (incumbent)	Independent	521	16.78%
Kirill Rudakov	Yabloko	394	12.69%
Olga Bocharova	Communist Party	373	12.02%
Konstantin Petrov	Independent	335	10.79%
Pyotr Cherny	Communist Party	318	10.24%
Vasily Krechetov	Communist Party	267	8.60%
Yevgeny Netesov	Liberal Democratic Party	264	8.51%
Maksim Ezau	New People	195	6.28%
Alisia Lukovskaya	A Just Russia — For Truth	167	5.38%
Dmitry Mishenkin	Independent	158	5.09%
Karen Bagdasarov	Communists of Russia	154	4.96%
Natalya Ivashova	Liberal Democratic Party	153	4.93%
Said Isayev	A Just Russia — For Truth	79	2.55%
Total		3,104	100%

Summary of the 9-11 September 2022 Tverskoy District Council of Deputies election in District 3
Candidate	Party	Votes	%
Vladimir Krzhesinsky	United Russia	1,197	37.95%
Pavel Malyshev	United Russia	979	31.04%
Nigyar Kozmina	United Russia	685	21.72%
Alina Fomicheva	Yabloko	608	19.28%
Olga Shlykova	New People	472	14.97%
Yury Zagrebnoy	A Just Russia — For Truth	451	14.30%
Aleksandr Nekrasov	Yabloko	436	13.82%
Ilya Makarov	Yabloko	406	12.87%
Maria Valdes Odriosola	A Just Russia — For Truth	349	11.07%
Lyudmila Nikolayeva	Communist Party	341	10.81%
Ivan Afonin	Liberal Democratic Party	269	8.53%
Sergey Makin	A Just Russia — For Truth	246	7.80%
Zhanna Lashchukhina	Communist Party	238	7.55%
Aleksandr Karev	Communists of Russia	229	7.26%
Dina Koganitskaya	Communist Party	223	7.07%
Irina Petukhova	New People	223	7.07%
yelena Oparina	Liberal Democratic Party	209	6.63%
Andrey Petrov	New People	207	6.56%
Total		3,154	100%

Summary of the 9-11 September 2022 Tverskoy District Council of Deputies election in District 4
Candidate	Party	Votes	%
Yelena Kuprova (incumbent)	United Russia	1,249	33.45%
Olga Kotyayeva	United Russia	1,145	30.66%
Yelena Kovaleva	United Russia	1,033	27.66%
Yakov Yakubovich (incumbent)	Independent	974	26.08%
Vera Vorobyeva	Independent	853	22.84%
Kirill Kirillov	Independent	791	21.18%
Sergey Shilovsky	Liberal Democratic Party	641	17.17%
Aleksandr Popov	Communist Party	387	10.36%
Dmitry Grigoryev	Communist Party	342	9.16%
Viktoria Zhuk	Communist Party	326	8.73%
Irina Pavlenko	A Just Russia — For Truth	248	6.64%
Svetlana Muranova	Independent	216	5.78%
Ivan Tersintsev	Independent	188	5.03%
Adam Abakarov	Independent	136	3.64%
Aleksandr Pavlenko	A Just Russia — For Truth	123	3.29%
Andrey Kuzmin	Liberal Democratic Party	118	3.16%
Vladimir Sushkov	Liberal Democratic Party	107	2.87%
Total		3,734	100%

=== Yakimanka District ===
United Russia flipped control over the Council of Deputies, winning 9 out of 10 seats (up from 1), while Yabloko retained a single seat from its 10-seat delegation.

Summary of the 9-11 September 2022 Yakimanka District Council of Deputies election in District 1
Candidate	Party	Votes	%
Dmitry Andreyev	United Russia	738	37.27%
Denis Nesterov	United Russia	709	35.81%
Denis Fomin-Nilov	United Russia	637	32.17%
Sergey Milenin	United Russia	634	32.02%
Svetlana Osiptsova	United Russia	630	31.82%
Darya Tsybulskaya	Yabloko	494	24.95%
Yekaterina Sedova	Yabloko	424	21.41%
Irina Kopkina	Yabloko	415	20.96%
Oksana Radionova	Yabloko	408	20.61%
Aleksandr Ryzhov	Yabloko	375	18.94%
Aleksandr Kisel	Communist Party	198	10.00%
Eduard Anashkin	Communist Party	191	9.65%
Aleksey Khanin	New People	183	9.24%
Dmitry Volchansky	A Just Russia — For Truth	165	8.33%
Viktoria Kashekova	Independent	160	8.08%
Yury Prostyakov	Communist Party	148	7.47%
Aleksandr Belyakov	Communist Party	141	7.12%
Nikita Ladygin	New People	118	5.96%
Anastasia Khatskevich	Urban Community Projects	118	5.96%
Pavel Aleksandrov	Urban Community Projects	116	5.86%
Aleksey Popov	Liberal Democratic Party	101	5.10%
Olga Petrova	Independent	98	4.95%
Yelena Timchenko	A Just Russia — For Truth	95	4.80%
Svetlana Lunina	Liberal Democratic Party	84	4.24%
Yevgeny Poletayev	A Just Russia — For Truth	83	4.19%
Anna Petrova	Urban Community Projects	82	4.14%
Denis Leontyev	New People	77	3.89%
Vsevolod Kolodka	Urban Community Projects	69	3.48%
Kristina Skryabina	Urban Community Projects	64	3.23%
Aleksandr Fedotov	Liberal Democratic Party	64	3.23%
Total		1,980	100%

Summary of the 9-11 September 2022 Yakimanka District Council of Deputies election in District 2
Candidate	Party	Votes	%
Svetlana Prokopenkova	United Russia	968	41.51%
Anton Azernikov	United Russia	804	34.48%
Alisa Belyakova	United Russia	688	29.50%
Vasily Dikarev (incumbent)	Yabloko	617	26.46%
Yelena Pavlova	United Russia	594	25.47%
Andrey Gordeyev (incumbent)	Yabloko	554	23.76%
Dmitry Koshlakov-Krestovsky	Liberal Democratic Party	520	22.30%
Vladimir Filippov	United Russia	506	21.70%
Irina Grinkevich	Yabloko	498	21.36%
Sergey Lomakin	A Just Russia — For Truth	457	19.60%
Sergey Izovsky	Liberal Democratic Party	383	16.42%
Dmitry Zakharov	A Just Russia — For Truth	208	8.92%
Sergey Dovgal	Communists of Russia	188	8.06%
Aleksandr Kornev	Independent	170	7.29%
Maksim Stychinsky	Urban Community Projects	146	6.26%
Lev Yudin	Communists of Russia	140	6.00%
Boris Yablokov	Urban Community Projects	139	5.96%
Vitaly Semenenko	New People	135	5.79%
Artyom Kiselev	New People	134	5.75%
Sergey Klimov	New People	121	5.19%
Yevgeny Davydenko	Liberal Democratic Party	119	5.10%
Igor Tikhonov	New People	116	4.97%
Darya Yegorova	Urban Community Projects	115	4.93%
Viktor Denisenko	Urban Community Projects	81	3.47%
Yegor Lugovoy	Liberal Democratic Party	76	3.26%
Ruslan Arbiyev	Urban Community Projects	71	3.04%
Dmitry Smetannikov	Liberal Democratic Party	68	2.92%
Konstantin Tsepov	Independent	68	2.92%
Total		2,332	100%

=== Zamoskvorechye District ===
United Russia retained control over the Council of Deputies, winning 8 out of 10 seats (up from 6), while Yabloko lost its entire 4-seat delegation. My Raion and A Just Russia – For Truth won one seat each.

Summary of the 9-11 September 2022 Zamoskvorechye District Council of Deputies election in District 1
Candidate	Party	Votes	%
Olga Goncharova	United Russia	1,447	32.37%
Denis Davydov (incumbent)	My Raion	1,309	29.28%
Anastasia Merkulova	United Russia	1,263	28.26%
Eduard Odinokov	United Russia	974	21.79%
Boris Smolsky	A Just Russia — For Truth	965	21.59%
Olga Zakharova	United Russia	910	20.36%
Yegor Tatsiy (incumbent)	Yabloko	855	19.13%
Ilya Stepanov	Yabloko	779	17.43%
Natalya Dremina	New People	730	16.33%
Lilia Manikhina	Yabloko	683	15.28%
Aleksandr Volchkov	New People	575	12.86%
Roman Klimentyev	Communist Party	509	11.39%
Kirill Guminsky	A Just Russia — For Truth	471	10.54%
Olesya Grushina	New People	380	8.50%
Konstantin Silkov	Communist Party	380	8.50%
Vadim Kvyatkovsky	Independent	354	7.92%
Lesya Nechiporuk	New People	349	7.81%
Vladimir Kuznetsov	Communist Party	336	7.52%
Tatyana Bibayeva	New People	331	7.40%
Igor Brumel	A Just Russia — For Truth	322	7.20%
Oleg Gorbachev	Communist Party	277	6.20%
Svetlana Gorina	Independent	272	6.09%
Yury Stepanov	Communist Party	250	5.59%
Nikolay Tsikhelashvili	A Just Russia — For Truth	203	4.54%
Yury Andriyenko	Independent	198	4.43%
Zhanna Verenich	Liberal Democratic Party	175	3.91%
Mikhail Suprunenko	Independent	171	3.83%
Natalia Kozareva	Liberal Democratic Party	168	3.76%
Total		4,470	100%

Summary of the 9-11 September 2022 Zamoskvorechye District Council of Deputies election in District 2
Candidate	Party	Votes	%
Nikolay Matveyev (incumbent)	United Russia	1,751	39.32%
Andrey Vostrikov (incumbent)	United Russia	1,709	38.38%
Oksana Mironova	United Russia	1,656	37.19%
Pavel Yemelyanov (incumbent)	United Russia	1,650	37.05%
Igor Molchanov	United Russia	1,614	36.25%
Vasily Khoroshilov	Yabloko	899	20.19%
Viktor Vasilyev	Yabloko	759	17.04%
Dmitry Gornostayev	Yabloko	752	16.89%
Vladislav Ivanov	Yabloko	692	15.54%
Ian Koynigan	Yabloko	632	14.19%
Vladimir Lyaskovsky	A Just Russia — For Truth	509	11.43%
Natalya Kirilina	Communist Party	473	10.62%
Sergey Nikonov	New People	460	10.33%
Mikhail Lukyanov	Communist Party	382	8.58%
Larisa Afanasyeva	Liberal Democratic Party	367	8.24%
Tatyana Gorbacheva	Communist Party	365	8.20%
Yelena Protasova	A Just Russia — For Truth	342	7.68%
Alla Minayeva	Communist Party	303	6.80%
Lora Matveyeva	Communist Party	249	5.59%
Valentina Perelygina	Liberal Democratic Party	229	5.14%
Marat Gibadulin	Communists of Russia	223	5.01%
Total		4,453	100%

== North-Western Administrative Okrug ==
=== Khoroshyovo-Mnyovniki District ===
United Russia won all but one of the 15 seats in the Council of Deputies, flipping two seats previously held by Communist Party and both seats held by Yabloko.

Summary of the 9-11 September 2022 Khoroshyovo-Mnyovniki District Council of Deputies election in District 1
Candidate	Party	Votes	%
Irina Belous (incumbent)	United Russia	4,588	41.58%
Igor Kolesov	United Russia	4,192	37.99%
Zagir Agamov	United Russia	3,602	32.64%
Irina Tsarkova	United Russia	3,226	29.24%
Aleksandr Lisenkov	Communist Party	3,059	27.72%
Yevgeny Selkin	United Russia	2,747	24.90%
Erik Lobakh	A Just Russia — For Truth	2,124	19.25%
Tatyana Logatskaya (incumbent)	Communist Party	1,965	17.81%
Ilya Sorokin	Yabloko	1,742	15.79%
Dmitry Koltunov	New People	1,329	12.04%
Viktor Nikitin	A Just Russia — For Truth	1,218	11.04%
Andrey Kolmakov	Communists of Russia	885	8.02%
Alina Lomovskikh	Independent	843	7.64%
Darya Lisyanskaya	Communists of Russia	799	7.24%
Yury Saprykin	Independent	777	7.04%
Vladimir Lisin	The Greens	698	6.33%
Total		11,034	100%

Summary of the 9-11 September 2022 Khoroshyovo-Mnyovniki District Council of Deputies election in District 2
Candidate	Party	Votes	%
Anna Zaytseva	United Russia	4,498	39.45%
Tatyana Ledovskaya	United Russia	3,870	33.94%
Marina Korotina	United Russia	3,592	31.50%
Nina Naumova (incumbent)	United Russia	2,895	25.39%
Tamara Shorina (incumbent)	United Russia	2,607	22.86%
Anna Maksimova	New People	2,549	22.35%
Sergey Borodulin	Communist Party	2,327	20.41%
Vladimir Sabri	New People	1,514	13.28%
Mikhail Bandurin	New People	1,475	12.94%
Fyodor Potapchenko	Communist Party	1,386	12.15%
Tatyana Belaya	A Just Russia — For Truth	1,350	11.84%
Tatyana Aksenova	Independent	1,330	11.66%
Marina Sladkova	Communist Party	1,070	9.38%
Konstantin Potapov	Independent	928	8.14%
Yelena Borovskaya	Communists of Russia	774	6.79%
Nina Troitskaya	Independent	738	6.47%
Valentina Nikitina	A Just Russia — For Truth	737	6.46%
Aleksey Bokhan	A Just Russia — For Truth	735	6.45%
Aleksandr Taryshkin	Communists of Russia	515	4.52%
Total		11,403	100%

Summary of the 9-11 September 2022 Khoroshyovo-Mnyovniki District Council of Deputies election in District 3
Candidate	Party	Votes	%
Anton Zhulin	United Russia	3,880	35.38%
Pavel Korolev (incumbent)	United Russia	3,779	34.46%
Mikhail Popkov (incumbent)	United Russia	3,194	29.12%
Andrey Zhitenev (incumbent)	United Russia	3,128	28.52%
Vladimir Ruban	United Russia	2,288	20.86%
Lyudmila Pokamestova	Communist Party	2,171	19.80%
Vladimir Panov	A Just Russia — For Truth	2,033	18.54%
Roman Baryshev	Yabloko	1,467	13.38%
Irina Andreyeva	Independent	1,280	11.67%
Andrey Senichev	New People	1,257	11.46%
Yekaterina Sazonova	New People	1,227	11.19%
Oleg Grebennikov	Independent	1,187	10.82%
Igor Lipin	A Just Russia — For Truth	1,108	10.10%
Dmitry Svetovidov	A Just Russia — For Truth	1,017	9.27%
Andrey Yurchuk	A Just Russia — For Truth	813	7.41%
Tatyana Gizo	A Just Russia — For Truth	782	7.13%
Anton Ponomarev	Communists of Russia	773	7.05%
Andrey Baryshev	The Greens	740	6.75%
Total		10,967	100%

=== Kurkino District ===
Group of Kurkino Independent deputies lost half of its 10 seats, however, Kurkino remained the only district in Moscow, where United Russia or My Raion failed to win a majority.

Summary of the 9-11 September 2022 Kurkino District Council of Deputies election in District 1
Candidate	Party	Votes	%
Vladislav Savelyev	Independent	931	26.01%
Lyudmila Polubatonova	My Raion	922	25.75%
Olga Lakhina	Independent	885	24.72%
Yuliana Kadantseva	My Raion	876	24.47%
Vitaly Fedotov (incumbent)	Independent	733	20.47%
Dmitry Grishchenko	Independent	731	20.42%
Sergey Bozhkov	A Just Russia — For Truth	714	19.94%
Vladislav Belyayev	My Raion	680	18.99%
Yan Galperin	A Just Russia — For Truth	660	18.44%
Aleksandr Levin	A Just Russia — For Truth	603	16.84%
Tatyana Orlova	Independent	530	14.80%
Pavel Solomakhin	My Raion	511	14.27%
Aleksandr Fedorov	Independent	453	12.65%
Andrey Kochkin	My Raion	430	12.01%
Vladimir Vorobyev	Independent	395	11.03%
Sergey Soldatov	New People	329	9.19%
Tatyana Fateyeva	Communists of Russia	329	9.19%
Artyom Razinkin	Independent	320	8.94%
Irina Korshunova	New People	298	8.32%
Total		3,580	100%

Summary of the 9-11 September 2022 Kurkino District Council of Deputies election in District 2
Candidate	Party	Votes	%
Olesya Sheina	My Raion	1,359	37.26%
Marina Dicheva	My Raion	1,035	28.38%
Dmitry Shumidub	Independent	999	27.39%
Anna Lukasik (incumbent)	Independent	985	27.01%
Yelena Sidelnikova (incumbent)	Independent	915	25.09%
Natalya Svergun (incumbent)	Independent	887	24.32%
Daniil Karpov	My Raion	878	24.07%
Irina Filyushina	My Raion	801	21.96%
Natalya Vasilevskaya	My Raion	723	19.82%
Inna Kovalenko	A Just Russia — For Truth	693	19.00%
Yevgeny Milashchenko	A Just Russia — For Truth	617	16.92%
Natalia Shcherbak	Independent	351	9.62%
Semyon Belousov	New People	296	8.12%
Lilia Karpenko	Independent	281	7.70%
Danil Zelenkov	Independent	256	7.02%
Vladimir Ozerov	New People	249	6.83%
Olga Krinochkina	A Just Russia — For Truth	227	6.22%
Inna Kitayeva	New People	217	5.95%
Yelizaveta Kovalenko	Independent	1,546	4.22%
Svetlana Aksenyuk	Independent	115	3.15%
Total		3,647	100%

=== Mitino District ===
United Russia retained control over the Council of Deputies, winning 10 seats, with the remaining two seats going to Communist Party and New People. Yabloko lost its single seat.

Summary of the 9-11 September 2022 Mitino District Council of Deputies election in District 1
Candidate	Party	Votes	%
Tatyana Smirnova (incumbent)	United Russia	4,082	38.78%
Alyona Volchikhina	United Russia	3,804	36.14%
Anatoly Dimov	Communist Party	3,141	29.84%
Vyacheslav Kuranov (incumbent)	United Russia	2,931	27.84%
Sergey Melnikov	Yabloko	1,468	13.95%
Denis Krylov	Liberal Democratic Party	1,311	12.45%
Vasily Kolganov	New People	1,238	11.76%
Timur Gasanov	New People	998	9.48%
Anastasia Kuzmenko	Liberal Democratic Party	801	7.61%
Ilya Denisov	Communists of Russia	739	7.02%
Total		10,527	100%

Summary of the 9-11 September 2022 Mitino District Council of Deputies election in District 2
Candidate	Party	Votes	%
Natalya Mukhina (incumbent)	United Russia	4,820	45.60%
Tatyana Cherednikova (incumbent)	United Russia	3,932	37.20%
Igor Kononov (incumbent)	United Russia	3,892	36.82%
Nikolay Kirgizov	New People	2,246	21.25%
Pyotr Zheleznyakov	A Just Russia — For Truth	1,683	15.92%
Natalya Yaresko	New People	1,193	11.29%
Vladimir Yasyulevich	Independent	1,079	10.21%
Total		10,571	100%

Summary of the 9-11 September 2022 Mitino District Council of Deputies election in District 3
Candidate	Party	Votes	%
Olga Kiseleva (incumbent)	United Russia	3,583	33.11%
Natalya Potseluyeva	New People	3,402	31.44%
Marina Sotnikova (incumbent)	United Russia	3,360	31.05%
Mikhail Ruda	Liberal Democratic Party	3,215	29.71%
Konstantin Kovalev	United Russia	2,392	22.11%
Vladimir Demidko	A Just Russia — For Truth	1,497	13.83%
Ivan Kobernik	New People	1,019	9.42%
Alina Ordak	The Greens	689	6.37%
Stepan Danilenko	Independent	602	5.56%
Yulia Potseluyeva	Independent	574	5.30%
Total		10,821	100%

Summary of the 9-11 September 2022 Mitino District Council of Deputies election in District 4
Candidate	Party	Votes	%
Vyacheslav Zhivilin (incumbent)	United Russia	4,935	43.67%
Natalya Chistyakova (incumbent)	United Russia	4,294	38.00%
Yury Anashkin (incumbent)	United Russia	3,336	29.52%
Aleksandr Baturin	Communist Party	1,523	13.48%
Svetlana Krivitskaya	Yabloko	1,284	11.36%
Pavel Dokukin	A Just Russia — For Truth	1,166	10.32%
Mikhail Lisov	New People	1,141	10.10%
Stanislav Shkayev	A Just Russia — For Truth	1,086	9.61%
Valery Denisenko	Yabloko	846	7.49%
Yelena Rozhnova	Independent	684	6.05%
Vladimir Lisin	Independent	644	5.70%
Arseny Badrak	Communists of Russia	460	4.07%
Total		11,301	100%

=== Pokrovskoye-Streshnevo District ===
United Russia retained control over the Council of Deputies, winning 11 seats, with the remaining seat going to Communist Party. Yabloko lost its single seat.

Summary of the 9-11 September 2022 Pokrovskoye-Streshnevo District Council of Deputies election in District 1
Candidate	Party	Votes	%
Yelena Volkova	United Russia	1,569	52.32%
Pavel Cherkasov (incumbent)	United Russia	1,265	42.18%
Irina Maksimyak	United Russia	1,209	40.31%
Yevgeny Galkin	A Just Russia — For Truth	521	17.37%
Svetlana Zhelantina	Yabloko	413	13.77%
Andrey Kopkin	Yabloko	369	12.30%
Aleksandr Zhuravlev	The Greens	268	8.94%
Sergey Bukovsky	New People	205	6.84%
Vladimir Solovyev	A Just Russia — For Truth	168	5.60%
Stanislav Abramov	The Greens	143	4.77%
Dmitry Yankovoy	New People	136	4.53%
Pyotr Inyakin	Independent	135	4.50%
Alina Salykina	The Greens	120	4.00%
Total		2,999	100%

Summary of the 9-11 September 2022 Pokrovskoye-Streshnevo District Council of Deputies election in District 2
Candidate	Party	Votes	%
Anna Komissarova (incumbent)	United Russia	1,136	39.00%
Svetlana Nadekhina	Communist Party	798	27.39%
Yulia Kochetova	United Russia	794	27.26%
Nikita Glushkov	Independent	783	26.88%
Nikita Yaroshenko (incumbent)	United Russia	714	24.51%
Dmitry Kozin	New People	379	13.01%
Vyacheslav Radchenko	Yabloko	350	12.02%
Galina Velichko	Yabloko	326	11.19%
Aleksandr Nikeyev	Communists of Russia	193	6.63%
Dmitry Romanov	Independent	179	6.14%
Yury Baklanov	Independent	143	4.91%
Total		2,913	100%

Summary of the 9-11 September 2022 Pokrovskoye-Streshnevo District Council of Deputies election in District 3
Candidate	Party	Votes	%
Marina Klimova (incumbent)	United Russia	1,566	51.75%
Vera Leonova	United Russia	1,160	38.33%
Natalya Chekaldina (incumbent)	United Russia	1,021	33.74%
Nikolay Samygin	Communist Party	660	21.81%
Kirill Lisovenko	Communist Party	495	16.36%
Guzal Cherekbasheva	New People	486	16.06%
Sergey Aganov	A Just Russia — For Truth	381	12.59%
Maksim Zavrazhen	The Greens	239	7.90%
Dmitry Marishkin	Communists of Russia	202	6.68%
Maksim Sarkisyan	The Greens	190	6.28%
Total		3,026	100%

Summary of the 9-11 September 2022 Pokrovskoye-Streshnevo District Council of Deputies election in District 4
Candidate	Party	Votes	%
Tatyana Bukhmina	United Russia	1,717	50.13%
Yury Silantyev	United Russia	1,323	38.63%
Nikolay Strakhov (incumbent)	United Russia	1,029	30.04%
Vladimir Kondratyev	A Just Russia — For Truth	964	28.15%
Kirill Karelin	Independent	484	14.13%
Alina Balyayeva	Yabloko	443	12.93%
Ksenia Rozhkova	Liberal Democratic Party	419	12.23%
Aleksandr Abushinov	Independent	245	7.15%
Total		3,425	100%

=== Severnoye Tushino District ===
United Russia retained control over the Council of Deputies, winning 12 seats, while 3 seats previously held by Yabloko were won by Communist Party, A Just Russia – For Truth and an independent.

Summary of the 9-11 September 2022 Severnoye Tushino District Council of Deputies election in District 1
Candidate	Party	Votes	%
Nikolay Ivannikov (incumbent)	United Russia	3,269	33.95%
Alla Kasatkina	United Russia	3,044	31.62%
Svetlana Komissarova (incumbent)	United Russia	2,851	29.61%
Dmitry Ibragimov	United Russia	2,389	24.81%
Yelena Serebrich	United Russia	2,285	23.73%
Tatyana Glazova	Independent	1,955	20.31%
Dmitry Zhukov	Independent	1,926	20.00%
Stanislav Tadey (incumbent)	Independent	1,848	19.19%
David Ulitsky	Independent	1,507	15.65%
Igor Yefremov	A Just Russia — For Truth	1,216	12.63%
Sergey Golokolenko	Communist Party	1,211	12.58%
Sergey Semenov	Independent	1,198	12.44%
Sergey Platonov	A Just Russia — For Truth	1,078	11.20%
Gadzhimurad Bagatyrov	New People	915	9.50%
Ivan Kolpakchi	Communist Party	739	7.68%
Vladimir Grishin	Communists of Russia	709	7.36%
Ruslan Gubanov	Communist Party	652	6.77%
Igor Garshin	Communists of Russia	641	6.66%
Aleksandr Fadeyev	Independent	551	5.72%
Total		9,628	100%

Summary of the 9-11 September 2022 Severnoye Tushino District Council of Deputies election in District 2
Candidate	Party	Votes	%
Anton Mikhalev	United Russia	3,722	38.03%
Irina Grachyova	United Russia	3,578	36.56%
Andrey Kruzhkov (incumbent)	United Russia	3,359	34.32%
Zhanna Gorbachyova	Communist Party	3,100	31.67%
Pavel Rybalsky (incumbent)	United Russia	3,038	31.04%
Stanislav Suyetin	United Russia	2,402	24.54%
Ksenia Vasilyeva	New People	1,654	16.90%
Vera Kolodina	A Just Russia — For Truth	1,179	12.05%
Natalya Gruzdova	Communist Party	1,100	11.24%
Oleg Kazmin	Communists of Russia	949	9.70%
Darya Bedash	A Just Russia — For Truth	786	8.03%
Yekaterina Glinova	Communists of Russia	742	7.58%
Anastasia Gromova	Communists of Russia	667	6.82%
Dmitry Demin	Communists of Russia	589	6.02%
Total		9,787	100%

Summary of the 9-11 September 2022 Severnoye Tushino District Council of Deputies election in District 3
Candidate	Party	Votes	%
Yelena Zharova (incumbent)	United Russia	3,481	35.19%
Andrey Gulko	A Just Russia — For Truth	3,075	31.09%
Natalya Shilkina	United Russia	2,998	30.31%
Vladimir Niskovskikh	United Russia	2,690	27.19%
Vera Morozova	Independent	2,585	26.13%
Anastasia Koshurnikova	United Russia	2,352	23.78%
Rinat Fattyakhetdinov	United Russia	2,310	23.35%
Andrey Prokofyev (incumbent)	Independent	2,046	20.68%
Vyacheslav Pyatikrestovsky	Independent	1,272	12.86%
Lada Dronova	Communist Party	1,226	12.39%
Yelena Byvsheva	Communist Party	1,215	12.28%
Boris Ivantsov	Communist Party	1,000	10.11%
Roman Tsarev	Communist Party	666	6.73%
Yaroslav Fedoseyev	Independent	650	6.57%
Nikolay Nikitin	Communist Party	642	6.49%
Darya Popova	Independent	633	6.40%
Natalia Bodyagina	Communists of Russia	606	6.13%
Vasily Nagaychenko	Communists of Russia	515	5.21%
Olga Danilova	Communists of Russia	481	4.86%
Yegor Ivanov	Communists of Russia	361	3.65%
Total		9,892	100%

=== Strogino District ===
After the number of seats in the Council of Deputies was reduced from 16 to 12 United Russia retained control over the Council, winning 11 mandates, while a single seat previously held by Yabloko flipped to My Raion.

Summary of the 9-11 September 2022 Strogino District Council of Deputies election in District 1
Candidate	Party	Votes	%
Natalya Tyurina	United Russia	3,883	39.66%
Yekaterina Tikhonova	My Raion	3,767	38.47%
Olga Andreyeva (incumbent)	United Russia	3,607	36.84%
Irina Kobtsova (incumbent)	United Russia	2,657	27.14%
Irina Kopkina (incumbent)	Yabloko	1,974	20.16%
Irina Novitskaya	A Just Russia — For Truth	1,474	15.05%
Aleksandr Askolsky	Liberal Democratic Party	1,133	11.57%
Yekaterina Nalivayko	A Just Russia — For Truth	1,094	11.17%
Aleksey Mironov	Independent	1,058	10.81%
Boris Lezhnev	New People	976	9.97%
Damir Ibgarimov	Independent	333	3.40%
Total		9,791	100%

Summary of the 9-11 September 2022 Strogino District Council of Deputies election in District 2
Candidate	Party	Votes	%
Yevgeny Anashkin (incumbent)	United Russia	3,928	41.80%
Tatyana Korochina (incumbent)	United Russia	3,463	36.85%
Dmitry Strutynsky (incumbent)	United Russia	2,862	30.46%
Olga Griyeva (incumbent)	United Russia	2,639	28.08%
Inna Gorislavtseva	A Just Russia — For Truth	2,217	23.59%
Dmitry Bolshakov	Liberal Democratic Party	1,947	20.72%
Andrey Manenkov	New People	1,613	17.17%
Aleksandr Kostin	A Just Russia — For Truth	1,176	12.51%
Maksim Kocherygin	Communists of Russia	1,053	11.21%
Total		9,397	100%

Summary of the 9-11 September 2022 Strogino District Council of Deputies election in District 3
Candidate	Party	Votes	%
Yevgeny Skudnov	United Russia	4,247	42.62%
Yevgeny Ternyak (incumbent)	United Russia	4,214	42.29%
Mikhail Ivanov (incumbent)	United Russia	4,061	40.75%
Roman Pitko (incumbent)	United Russia	3,267	32.78%
Nikolay Zykov	Communist Party	233	23.71%
Tatyana Avdeyeva	The Greens	2,117	21.24%
Anna Boykova	Communists of Russia	1,313	13.18%
Total		9,965	100%

=== Yuzhnoye Tushino District ===
United Russia retained control over the Council of Deputies with the reduced majority of 9 seats, while other three seats were won by candidates of Communist Party, Liberal Democratic Party and Communists of Russia (the only winning candidate of the party in Moscow).

Summary of the 9-11 September 2022 Yuzhnoye Tushino District Council of Deputies election in District 1
Candidate	Party	Votes	%
Svetlana Volovets (incumbent)	United Russia	3,064	42.32%
Viktor Roshchin	United Russia	2,620	36.19%
Yekaterina Dotsenko	United Russia	2,530	34.94%
Aleksandr Vlasov	Communist Party	1,585	21.89%
Kirill Semuchenkov	United Russia	1,539	21.26%
Nina Borisova (incumbent)	Independent	1,324	18.29%
Natalia Borisova	Independent	1,068	14.75%
Artyom Karpenko	A Just Russia — For Truth	693	9.57%
Anton Trubin	Communist Party	649	8.96%
Roman Kolotovkin	New People	612	8.45%
Maksim Vdovin	Communists of Russia	530	7.32%
Aleksandr Loboyko	A Just Russia — For Truth	510	7.04%
Andrey Konovalov	Independent	465	6.42%
Mikhail Melnik	Communists of Russia	419	5.79%
Andrey Kolmakov	Communists of Russia	372	5.14%
Rafik Aygnin	A Just Russia — For Truth	273	3.77%
Total		7,240	100%

Summary of the 9-11 September 2022 Yuzhnoye Tushino District Council of Deputies election in District 2
Candidate	Party	Votes	%
Aleksandr Volodin (incumbent)	United Russia	2,834	42.08%
Lyudmila Maslova (incumbent)	United Russia	2,758	40.95%
Aleksandr Vasilyev	Liberal Democratic Party	1,806	26.82%
Aleksey Frantsev	United Russia	1,764	26.19%
Aleksey Semenov	United Russia	1,604	23.82%
Sergey Salin	New People	1,299	19.29%
Ivan Zhigalov	Communist Party	783	11.63%
Olga Matveyeva	A Just Russia — For Truth	720	10.69%
Roman Mikhel	Communists of Russia	652	9.68%
Anna Deyneko	Independent	639	9.49%
Vladimir Grishin	Communists of Russia	556	8.26%
Total		6,735	100%

Summary of the 9-11 September 2022 Yuzhnoye Tushino District Council of Deputies election in District 3
Candidate	Party	Votes	%
Denis Budkin (incumbent)	United Russia	2,630	37.57%
Yekaterina Bakasheva	Communists of Russia	2,440	34.86%
Irina Vetchinnikova	United Russia	2,363	33.76%
Aleksey Obraztsov (incumbent)	United Russia	1,885	26.93%
Larisa Borisenko	United Russia	1,847	26.39%
Aleksey Balin	New People	1,593	22.76%
Anton Balandin	Communist Party	852	12.17%
Yekaterina Ryzhik	Independent	782	11.17%
Yevgeny Idzikovsky	New People	761	10.87%
Viktor Fedotov	A Just Russia — For Truth	633	9.04%
Oskar Khusnutdinov	New People	574	8.20%
Olga Smirnova	A Just Russia — For Truth	504	7.20%
Aleksey Koloskov	A Just Russia — For Truth	498	7.11%
Ilya Samitov	Communists of Russia	470	6.71%
Total		7,000	100%

== South-Eastern Administrative Okrug ==
=== Kapotnya District ===
United Russia retained control over the Council of Deputies but ceded one seat to an allied Independent.

Summary of the 9-11 September 2022 Kapotnya District Council of Deputies election in District 1
Candidate	Party	Votes	%
Irina Turmasova	United Russia	1,996	59.02%
Yulia Gubina	United Russia	1,881	55.62%
Yulia Guskova	United Russia	1,774	52.45%
Yury Kabanov (incumbent)	United Russia	1,730	51.15%
Aleksey Orlov (incumbent)	United Russia	1,701	50.30%
Gennady Roshchupkin	Liberal Democratic Party	495	14.64%
Yevgeny Afanasyev	New People	436	12.89%
Vladimir Galkin	Communist Party	422	12.48%
Roman Pirozhkov	Communist Party	361	10.67%
Total		3,382	100%

Summary of the 9-11 September 2022 Kapotnya District Council of Deputies election in District 2
Candidate	Party	Votes	%
Irina Ulyanova	United Russia	1,959	61.05%
Tatyana Zorya	United Russia	1,808	56.34%
Natalya Sitnikova (incumbent)	United Russia	1,757	54.75%
Irina Silayeva	United Russia	1,631	50.83%
Anna Danilova	Independent	1,271	39.61%
Viktor Velichko	A Just Russia — For Truth	414	12.90%
Semyon Rodin	Communist Party	349	10.88%
Marina Andrianova	Independent	305	9.50%
Sergey Yermilov	Communist Party	285	8.88%
Vitalia Kulikova	Independent	226	7.04%
Total		3,209	100%

=== Kuzminki District ===
United Russia retained control over the Council of Deputies but lost two seats to Liberal Democratic Party and A Just Russia – For Truth.

Summary of the 9-11 September 2022 Kuzminki District Council of Deputies election in District 1
Candidate	Party	Votes	%
Marina Volkova (incumbent)	United Russia	3,127	36.40%
Yelena Kirsanova (incumbent)	United Russia	2,878	33.50%
Larisa Malysheva	United Russia	2,701	31.44%
Aleksandr Druzhinin	United Russia	2,245	26.14%
Dmitry Portnov	Liberal Democratic Party	2,022	23.54%
Kristina Kardava	Liberal Democratic Party	1,670	19.44%
Vadim Dzudza (incumbent)	United Russia	1,500	17.46%
Yulia Panshina	Independent	1,103	12.84%
Yury Yevtushenkov	Communist Party	1,007	11.72%
Olga Izhenyakova	Independent	979	11.40%
Sergey Ivanov	Communist Party	923	10.75%
Artur Imangulov	Communist Party	820	9.55%
Ulyana Turusova	New People	754	8.78%
Vyacheslav Petrov	Communist Party	590	6.87%
Yegor Karpenko	A Just Russia — For Truth	556	6.47%
Maria Morozova	A Just Russia — For Truth	544	6.33%
Maksim Tkachenko	Communist Party	475	5.53%
Vadim Zheleznyakov	Independent	465	5.41%
Tatyana Sidorova	Independent	437	5.09%
Yekaterina Udovidchik	A Just Russia — For Truth	424	4.94%
Total		8,590	100%

Summary of the 9-11 September 2022 Kuzminki District Council of Deputies election in District 2
Candidate	Party	Votes	%
Aleksandra Polyanskaya (incumbent)	United Russia	3,371	38.34%
Yury Shelukhin (incumbent)	United Russia	2,881	32.76%
Vladimir Obozny	A Just Russia – For Truth	2,619	29.79%
Yelena Markova	United Russia	1,990	22.63%
Nikolay Shalashov	United Russia	1,912	21.74%
Khristian Rakovsky-Samoylov	United Russia	1,557	17.71%
Nikita Naumov	New People	1,451	16.50%
Aleksandr Gerasimov	Communist Party	1,160	13.19%
Mikhail Antimonov	Communist Party	930	10.58%
Irina Kovaleva	New People	918	10.44%
Maria Guzikova	Communist Party	880	10.01%
Maksim Vyrodov	Liberal Democratic Party	870	9.89%
Yekaterina Kondraticheva	Independent	834	9.48%
Aleksandr Paskanny	Communist Party	749	8.52%
Valery Limet	New People	738	8.39%
Sergey Andreyev	Independent	653	7.43%
Mikhail Gubsky	Independent	496	5.64%
Nikita Korneyev	A Just Russia — For Truth	473	5.38%
Vladislav Lychagin	A Just Russia — For Truth	381	4.33%
Vladislav Kupchenko	Independent	319	3.63%
Azat Garrybayev	A Just Russia — For Truth	248	2.82%
Akmal Vakhidov	Independent	189	2.15%
Total		8,793	100%

Summary of the 9-11 September 2022 Kuzminki District Council of Deputies election in District 3
Candidate	Party	Votes	%
Nadezhda Shestyreva	United Russia	3,403	38.19%
Lyudmila Polyakova (incumbent)	United Russia	2,835	31.82%
Anastasia Goshlya	United Russia	2,683	30.11%
Tatyana Gorelko	United Russia	2,458	27.59%
Alan Kalabekov (incumbent)	United Russia	2,380	26.71%
Dmitry Alekseyev	Communist Party	1,862	20.90%
Aleksey Gerasimov	Communist Party	1,617	18.15%
Dmitry Postnikov	Communist Party	1,203	13.50%
Yuris Aydashev	Independent	1,186	13.31%
Sergey Guba	Communist Party	1,156	12.97%
Stanislav Smirnov	Independent	919	10.31%
Natalia Khrustaleva	Communist Party	874	9.81%
Tatyana Titova	A Just Russia — For Truth	739	8.29%
Olga Smetanina	Independent	684	7.68%
Vadim Tarasov	A Just Russia — For Truth	666	7.47%
Olga Savitskaya	Independent	601	6.75%
Tatyana Filatova	A Just Russia — For Truth	448	5.03%
Viktoria Aleyeva	Independent	365	4.10%
Arsen Atayev	A Just Russia — For Truth	337	3.78%
Total		8,910	100%

=== Lefortovo District ===
United Russia retained control over the Council of Deputies, winning 12 seats (up from 11), while Communist Party lost its entire 3-member delegation.

Summary of the 9-11 September 2022 Lefortovo District Council of Deputies election in District 1
Candidate	Party	Votes	%
Svetlana Bykova	United Russia	2,787	43.63%
Yelena Kotomina (incumbent)	United Russia	2,784	43.58%
Aleksey Reuel	United Russia	2,503	39.18%
Vyacheslav Dushenko	A Just Russia – For Truth	2,472	38.70%
Marshall Savchuk	United Russia	2,412	37.76%
Vitaly Avdeyev	United Russia	1,574	24.64%
Fyodor Pashchenkov	Communist Party	1,230	19.25%
Anna Gurova	Communist Party	1,125	17.61%
Vasily Semenov	Communist Party	966	15.12%
Denis Gulyayev	Communist Party	858	13.43%
Vladimir Pakhomov (incumbent)	Independent	708	11.08%
Artyom Chebotarev	New People	696	10.90%
Aleksandr Tarasov	New People	514	8.05%
Yulia Saksina	New People	441	6.90%
Ivan Antonov	New People	382	5.98%
Natalya Novikova	A Just Russia — For Truth	346	5.42%
Maya Gurina	Communists of Russia	343	5.37%
Total		6,388	100%

Summary of the 9-11 September 2022 Lefortovo District Council of Deputies election in District 2
Candidate	Party	Votes	%
Olga Betyayeva (incumbent)	United Russia	2,322	42.36%
Yelena Ilyukhina (incumbent)	United Russia	2,204	40.21%
Nikolay Nuzhdin (incumbent)	United Russia	2,126	38.79%
Pavel Alshanets	United Russia	2,001	36.51%
Samson Sholademi	Independent	1,716	31.31%
Yulia Svistakova	Communist Party	956	17.44%
Maksim Kravchenko	New People	880	16.06%
Filipp Kuzin	Communist Party	715	13.05%
Viktor Mikhaylov	Independent	601	10.97%
Aleksandra Andreyeva	Independent	591	10.78%
Konstantin Ponomaryov	Liberal Democratic Party	575	10.49%
Adel Sultanov	Communist Party	522	9.52%
Vadim Tarasov	A Just Russia — For Truth	512	9.34%
Filipp Chomayev	United Russia	454	8.28%
Roman Silayev	Independent	407	7.43%
Total		5,481	100%

Summary of the 9-11 September 2022 Lefortovo District Council of Deputies election in District 3
Candidate	Party	Votes	%
Aleksey Vorotnikov	United Russia	2,232	38.89%
Aleksey Zakharov	United Russia	1,965	34.23%
Nadezhda Foshina	United Russia	1,744	30.38%
Mikhail Surkov (incumbent)	United Russia	1,651	28.76%
Darya Averkina	New People	1,502	26.17%
Andrey Chivikov	Communist Party	1,444	25.16%
Alla Krayko	Communist Party	1,073	18.69%
Tatyana Samiyeva	United Russia	1,048	18.26%
Stanislav Bokov	Independent	810	14.11%
Mikhail Sivornov	Communist Party	797	13.89%
Oleg Ovtsynov	Communist Party	760	13.24%
Viktor Karnaukhov	Liberal Democratic Party	708	12.33%
Marina Lapantayeva	Communist Party	670	11.67%
Tatyana Lytenkova	New People	590	10.28%
Lyubov Andreyeva	Communists of Russia	459	8.00%
Sergey Lazutkin	Independent	441	7.68%
Yury Shamray	Independent	349	6.08%
Total		5,740	100%

=== Lyublino District ===
United Russia retained control over the Council of Deputies but lost one seat to the Liberal Democratic Party.

Summary of the 9-11 September 2022 Lyublino District Council of Deputies election in District 1
Candidate	Party	Votes	%
Yaroslav Zhukov	United Russia	4,989	46.07%
Yelena Bakhtina	United Russia	4,756	43.92%
Viktor Loktionov (incumbent)	United Russia	4,302	39.73%
Ruslan Bagautdinov (incumbent)	United Russia	3,750	34.63%
Aleksandr Yakov (incumbent)	United Russia	3,658	33.78%
Sergey Moroz	Communist Party	1,848	17.07%
Yekaterina Selivanova	Communist Party	1,411	13.03%
Irina Prasolova	Communist Party	1,397	12.90%
Eduard Mamedov	Communist Party	1,254	11.58%
Darya Selivanova	Independent	1,238	11.43%
Yevgeny Nechepurenko	A Just Russia — For Truth	914	8.44%
Igor Pogosyan	Communist Party	891	8.23%
Lyubov Polikashina	Communists of Russia	829	7.66%
Ildar Shadayev	A Just Russia — For Truth	745	6.88%
Yevgeny Medvedev	Communists of Russia	738	6.82%
Total		10,828	100%

Summary of the 9-11 September 2022 Lyublino District Council of Deputies election in District 2
Candidate	Party	Votes	%
Marina Astashkina (incumbent)	United Russia	4,153	40.10%
Tatyana Bronzes (incumbent)	United Russia	4,058	39.18%
Nikolay Zyuzin (incumbent)	United Russia	3,532	34.10%
Natalya Chistyakova (incumbent)	United Russia	3,491	33.71%
Konstantin Ponomaryov	Liberal Democratic Party	3,312	31.98%
Aleksandr Achkasov (incumbent)	United Russia	3,312	31.98%
Yelena Gulicheva	Communist Party	1,780	17.19%
Aleksandr Kochetkov	Communist Party	1,373	13.26%
Nikolay Raytsev	Communist Party	1,242	11.99%
Sergey Suslov	Communist Party	1,191	11.50%
Zinaida Gulina	Communists of Russia	807	7.79%
Roman Salitsyn	Communists of Russia	776	7.49%
Total		10,357	100%

Summary of the 9-11 September 2022 Lyublino District Council of Deputies election in District 3
Candidate	Party	Votes	%
Tatyana Solovyeva	United Russia	3,612	38.28%
Yelizaveta Chirkova (incumbent)	United Russia	3,569	37.82%
Irina Didenko	United Russia	3,332	35.31%
Yury Andrianov (incumbent)	United Russia	2,922	30.97%
Viktor Surodin (incumbent)	United Russia	2,881	30.53%
Maria Bazhenova	New People	2,706	28.68%
Maksim Ostry	Communist Party	1,496	15.85%
Igor Alekseyev	Communist Party	1,481	15.70%
Svetlana Afanasyeva	A Just Russia — For Truth	1,466	15.54%
Marina Kalacheva	Independent	957	10.14%
Yevgenia Abroskina	Independent	920	9.75%
Shamil Gadzhimirzayev	New People	523	5.54%
Total		9,436	100%

Summary of the 9-11 September 2022 Lyublino District Council of Deputies election in District 4
Candidate	Party	Votes	%
Larisa Kutuzova (incumbent)	United Russia	4,623	45.65%
Dmitry Glotov (incumbent)	United Russia	4,252	41.98%
Ilya Khokhlov	United Russia	3,882	38.33%
Yevgeny Timonin (incumbent)	United Russia	3,215	31.74%
Kamran Mamedov (incumbent)	United Russia	2,988	29.50%
Maria Guseva	Independent	2,204	21.76%
Leonid Lesnichenko	Communist Party	1,799	17.76%
Aleksandr Kamzolov	Communist Party	1,625	16.04%
Anton Gripich	Communist Party	1,456	14.38%
Maksim Salimov	Communist Party	1,126	11.12%
Total		10,128	100%

=== Maryino District ===
United Russia retained control over the Council of Deputies, winning all 20 seats.

Summary of the 9-11 September 2022 Maryino District Council of Deputies election in District 1
Candidate	Party	Votes	%
Galina Andreyeva (incumbent)	United Russia	8,416	53.39%
Roman Abramov	United Russia	7,803	49.50%
Aleksandra Voronova	United Russia	6,407	40.64%
Yury Razudalov	United Russia	5,838	37.03%
Svetlana Pakush	United Russia	5,593	35.48%
Konstantin Korolev	Communists of Russia	1,937	12.29%
Sergey Smirnov	New People	1,782	11.30%
Nikolay Ivanin	New People	1,663	10.55%
Aleksandr Vlasov	Independent	1,500	9.52%
Valery Korolev	Independent	1,492	9.46%
Viktor Merkulov	Communists of Russia	1,151	7.30%
Total		15,764	100%

Summary of the 9-11 September 2022 Maryino District Council of Deputies election in District 2
Candidate	Party	Votes	%
Tamara Trunova (incumbent)	United Russia	6,934	48.92%
Olga Golitsyna (incumbent)	United Russia	6,797	47.95%
Nikita Glotov	United Russia	5,960	42.05%
Yana Sarbeyeva	United Russia	5,417	38.22%
Anastasia Savkina	United Russia	4,942	34.86%
Yelena Veretennikova	New People	2,462	17.37%
Tatyana Veretentseva	Independent	2,424	17.10%
Aleksey Vladykin	New People	2,231	15.74%
Yevgeny Biserov	A Just Russia — For Truth	1,727	12.18%
Dina Akhmedzhanova	Independent	555	3.92%
Rinat Aymaletdinov	Independent	501	3.53%
Rakhmana Gadzhiyeva	Independent	371	2.62%
Total		14,175	100%

Summary of the 9-11 September 2022 Maryino District Council of Deputies election in District 3
Candidate	Party	Votes	%
Irina Klyuchnikova (incumbent)	United Russia	6,766	48.58%
Anton Batalov (incumbent)	United Russia	6,430	46.17%
Natalya Meshcheryakova (incumbent)	United Russia	5,477	39.33%
Yevgeny Menshikov (incumbent)	United Russia	5,326	38.24%
Viktor Sotskov (incumbent)	United Russia	4,990	35.83%
Sergey Bersenev	Communist Party	2,237	16.06%
Aleksey Sharakhov	New People	2,137	15.34%
Anastasia Gurkova	New People	1,851	13.29%
Maria Shishkina	A Just Russia — For Truth	1,627	11.68%
Tatyana Gurkova	Communist Party	1,459	10.48%
Oleg Kozhushko	Communist Party	1,258	9.03%
Zinaida Gulina	Communists of Russia	1,037	7.45%
Total		13,927	100%

Summary of the 9-11 September 2022 Maryino District Council of Deputies election in District 4
Candidate	Party	Votes	%
Yulia Akimova	United Russia	6,578	45.70%
Olga Averchnikova	United Russia	6,248	43.40%
Eleonora Nikolova	United Russia	5,349	37.16%
Yelena Smirnova	United Russia	5,273	36.63%
Irina Galkina (incumbent)	United Russia	5,064	35.18%
Andrey Sivov	Communist Party	2,958	20.55%
Varvara Sletova	New People	2,471	17.17%
Yulia Khayretdinova	Independent	2,165	15.04%
Total		14,395	100%

=== Nekrasovka District ===
United Russia retained control over the Council of Deputies, winning 11 seats, while New People flipped a single seat previously held by Communist Party.

Summary of the 9-11 September 2022 Nekrasovka District Council of Deputies election in District 1
Candidate	Party	Votes	%
Aleksandr Artemyev (incumbent)	United Russia	4,590	60.36%
Anna Samburova	United Russia	3,725	48.98%
Irina Ukhabotina (incumbent)	United Russia	3,498	46.00%
Marina Ponomarenko (incumbent)	United Russia	3,495	45.96%
Dmitry Perevezentsev	Communist Party	876	11.52%
Nikita Shakhnazarov	Communist Party	707	9.30%
Ruslan Grebennikov	New People	685	9.01%
Artyom Gorbachev	Communist Party	645	8.48%
Marat Belyalov	Communist Party	602	7.92%
Aleksandr Kryuchkov	Liberal Democratic Party	486	6.39%
Vladimir Gavrikov	Communists of Russia	482	6.34%
Diana Karmanova	Liberal Democratic Party	454	5.97%
Stanislav Kruglikov-Kotovsky	Liberal Democratic Party	420	5.52%
Sergey Kukharets	A Just Russia — For Truth	373	4.90%
Total		7,605	100%

Summary of the 9-11 September 2022 Nekrasovka District Council of Deputies election in District 2
Candidate	Party	Votes	%
Olga Voskresenskaya	United Russia	3,947	48.96%
Maya Bulayeva	United Russia	3,849	47.75%
Galina Siskova	United Russia	3,040	37.71%
Violetta Voronina	United Russia	2,167	26.88%
Denis Filippenkov	Liberal Democratic Party	1,711	21.23%
Roman Merenkov	Independent	1,122	13.92%
Dmitry Mekhedov	Independent	989	12.27%
Andrey Stanovkin	Communist Party	746	9.25%
Sergey Antimonov	Communist Party	719	8.92%
Andrey Varenik	Communist Party	624	7.74%
Yulia Shompolova	Communist Party	559	6.93%
Maria Litvinova	New People	523	6.49%
Vitaly Lebedev	New People	442	5.48%
Dmitry Kokorin	A Just Russia — For Truth	399	4.95%
Dmitry Belchenko	Liberal Democratic Party	340	4.22%
Ruslan Syrazhetdinov	Independent	311	3.86%
Khanbava Akperov	Liberal Democratic Party	203	2.52%
Total		8,061	100%

Summary of the 9-11 September 2022 Nekrasovka District Council of Deputies election in District 3
Candidate	Party	Votes	%
Oleg Degtyarev (incumbent)	United Russia	3,094	48.42%
Olga Malyutina (incumbent)	United Russia	2,595	40.61%
Kirill Prochukhanov	New People	2,053	32.13%
Yelena Semenova (incumbent)	United Russia	2,051	32.10%
Natalya Lavrova	United Russia	1,636	25.60%
Yekaterina Bliznyuk	A Just Russia — For Truth	1,484	23.22%
Dmitry Shuvalov (incumbent)	Communist Party	800	12.52%
Aleksey Medvedev	Communist Party	763	11.94%
Viktor Ivanitsky	Communist Party	500	7.82%
Dmitry Yelbakiyev	Communist Party	474	7.42%
Lyudmila Alatyrtseva	A Just Russia — For Truth	461	7.21%
Anton Davydov	Liberal Democratic Party	438	6.85%
Svetlana Zhavyrkina	Communists of Russia	416	6.51%
Anton Shuvalov	Independent	278	4.35%
Total		6,390	100%

=== Nizhegorodsky District ===
United Russia retained control over the Council of Deputies, winning all 10 seats.

Summary of the 9-11 September 2022 Nizhegorodsky District Council of Deputies election in District 1
Candidate	Party	Votes	%
Yelena Ishkina	United Russia	2,204	49.05%
Vasily Finagin	United Russia	2,143	47.70%
Yelena Bondareva (incumbent)	United Russia	1,992	44.34%
Andrey Sitnikov (incumbent)	United Russia	1,910	42.51%
Natalia Pilipenko	United Russia	1,666	37.08%
Ivan Lobov	Communist Party	747	16.63%
Kirill Bedrin	Communist Party	580	12.91%
Anzhey Golembiovsky	Communist Party	463	10.30%
Mikhail Dyskin	New People	412	9.17%
Viktor Volkov	Independent	397	8.84%
Roman Aliyev	New People	393	8.75%
Nikita Zavada	Liberal Democratic Party	311	6.92%
Anna Nikishina	Communists of Russia	283	6.30%
Olga Volkova	Independent	279	6.21%
Dinara Nikishkina	New People	261	5.81%
Yulia Guzhvinskaya	Independent	234	5.21%
Total		4,493	100%

Summary of the 9-11 September 2022 Nizhegorodsky District Council of Deputies election in District 2
Candidate	Party	Votes	%
Natalya Zdobnova (incumbent)	United Russia	2,277	45.11%
Lyudmila Velikonskaya	United Russia	2,226	44.10%
Manvel Aperyan (incumbent)	United Russia	2,139	42.37%
Yulia Danilova	United Russia	2,098	41.56%
Anastasia Turovskaya	United Russia	1,759	34.85%
Andrey Repin	Liberal Democratic Party	1,033	20.46%
Natalia Ivleva	Independent	957	18.96%
Yelena Matveyeva	A Just Russia — For Truth	623	12.34%
Viktoria Leptyagina	A Just Russia — For Truth	539	10.68%
Total		5,048	100%

=== Pechatniki District ===
United Russia retained control over the Council of Deputies, winning 13 seats. Communist Party lost one of its two seats, while New People gained one.

Summary of the 9-11 September 2022 Pechatniki District Council of Deputies election in District 1
Candidate	Party	Votes	%
Denis Gordeyev	United Russia	3,009	48.59%
Aleksandra Dulova	United Russia	2,844	45.92%
Irina Lopatynskaya	United Russia	2,445	39.48%
Viktoria Shepeleva	United Russia	2,343	37.83%
Alla Kuznetsova	United Russia	1,839	29.69%
Leonid Polovnikov	Liberal Democratic Party	1,416	22.86%
Yegor Biryukov	Communist Party	766	12.37%
Aleksandra Lopoukhova	Independent	667	10.77%
Vyacheslav Yefimov	Independent	532	8.59%
Tatyana Tuchak	Independent	504	8.14%
Tatyana Tyutrina	Communist Party	500	8.07%
Anna Balykova	Independent	437	7.06%
Andrey Shchipilo	Communist Party	433	6.99%
Maksim Sotskov	New People	412	6.65%
Maria Tomenyuk	New People	409	6.60%
Konstantin Maryinsky	New People	405	6.54%
Samson Sholademi	Independent	369	5.96%
Yevgeny Orel	Communists of Russia	341	5.51%
Valeria Baydala	Communist Party	285	4.60%
Aleksandr Balashov	Communists of Russia	239	3.86%
Ruslan Abdullayev	New People	166	2.68%
Sirus Abaszade	Communist Party	156	2.52%
Ashot Abazyan	Independent	86	1.39%
Total		6,193	100%

Summary of the 9-11 September 2022 Pechatniki District Council of Deputies election in District 2
Candidate	Party	Votes	%
Anton Yegorov	United Russia	2,995	46.55%
Aleksandra Matveyeva (incumbent)	United Russia	2,687	41.76%
Aleksey Uryupin (incumbent)	United Russia	2,248	34.94%
Irina Kurbatova (incumbent)	United Russia	2,237	34.77%
Ilya Konovalov	Communist Party	1,947	30.26%
Viktoria Savchenkova	United Russia	1,874	29.13%
Natalya Brezhneva	Liberal Democratic Party	831	12.92%
Aleksandr Vlasov	Independent	829	12.88%
Igor Borisov	Communist Party	814	12.65%
Mubin Bilyalov	New People	739	11.49%
Margarita Cherepanova	Liberal Democratic Party	623	9.68%
Total		6,434	100%

Summary of the 9-11 September 2022 Pechatniki District Council of Deputies election in District 3
Candidate	Party	Votes	%
Nikolay Akimov (incumbent)	United Russia	3,151	47.30%
Nikolay Basov	United Russia	2,762	41.46%
Oleg Ananyin (incumbent)	United Russia	2,655	39.85%
Tatyana Pugach	United Russia	1,782	26.75%
Anton Malyshev	New People	1,707	25.62%
Darya Moskaltsova	Liberal Democratic Party	1,307	19.62%
Liana Iosebadze	United Russia	1,201	18.03%
Viktor Smetanyuk	New People	837	12.56%
Ivan Kireyev	New People	730	10.96%
Aleksandr Kopylov	A Just Russia — For Truth	726	10.90%
Vladislav Lyubochko	Communist Party	586	8.80%
Aleksey Kostin	Independent	562	8.44%
Dmitry Romanov	Liberal Democratic Party	502	7.54%
Nikita Sedykh	Communist Party	475	7.13%
Vakhtang Chkuaseli	A Just Russia — For Truth	311	4.67%
Total		6,662	100%

=== Ryazansky District ===
United Russia retained control over the Council of Deputies, winning all 10 seats.

Summary of the 9-11 September 2022 Ryazansky District Council of Deputies election in District 1
Candidate	Party	Votes	%
Valery Kharlamov	United Russia	6,681	54.63%
Anatoly Yevseyev (incumbent)	United Russia	5,883	48.10%
Marina Smelova (incumbent)	United Russia	5,363	43.85%
Aleksey Romanov (incumbent)	United Russia	5,075	41.50%
Ilya Sosnovsky (incumbent)	United Russia	4,650	38.02%
Vadim Aleksandrov	New People	2,220	18.15%
Aleksey Yegorov	Communist Party	1,998	16.34%
Yegor Kalinin	A Just Russia — For Truth	1,702	13.92%
Valery Sotnik	Communist Party	1,670	13.65%
Igor Katkov	Communist Party	1,572	12.85%
Total		12,230	100%

Summary of the 9-11 September 2022 Ryazansky District Council of Deputies election in District 2
Candidate	Party	Votes	%
Yelena Popova	United Russia	5,110	46.26%
Yelena Popova	United Russia	5,052	45.73%
Oleg Litovchenko	United Russia	4,385	39.69%
Larisa Alymova-Orlova (incumbent)	United Russia	4,237	38.35%
Nikolay Porodin (incumbent)	United Russia	4,129	37.38%
Sergey Serov	Communist Party	2,301	20.83%
Viktoria Samoylovich	New People	2,221	20.11%
Ivan Tulchevsky	Communist Party	1,564	14.16%
Total		11,047	100%

== South-Western Administrative Okrug ==
=== Akademichesky District ===
My Raion won the majority in the Council of Deputies winning 8 seats, while another 3 seats were won by allied United Russia (up from none). Communist Party won 1 seat from its previous 3, while Yabloko (5), Party of Growth (2) and PARNAS (1) all lost its entire delegations.

Summary of the 9-11 September 2022 Akademichesky District Council of Deputies election in District 1
Candidate	Party	Votes	%
Valentina Savitskaya	United Russia	2,315	37.15%
Irina Smirnova	My Raion	1,921	30.82%
Olga Melnikova	My Raion	1,538	24.68%
Sergey Kostyuchenko	My Raion	1,212	19.45%
Yegor Ryzhkov	Communist Party	1,148	18.42%
Irina Yefremova	Communist Party	989	15.87%
Mikhail Mitelman	Independent	968	15.53%
Yekaterina Pikalyova	New People	964	15.47%
Ivan Rashchenya	Yabloko	662	10.62%
Aleksandr Novigatsky	Independent	609	9.77%
Tatyana Chernomashentseva	Yabloko	515	8.26%
Ivan Butov	A Just Russia — For Truth	506	8.12%
Svetlana Kaneva	Communist Party	503	8.07%
Andrey Zorin	New People	430	6.90%
Kirill Gotskalo	Liberal Democratic Party	397	6.37%
Dmitry Dostovalov	New People	387	6.21%
Vladimir Vorobyev	Communists of Russia	380	6.10%
Sergey Kapchuk	Independent	334	5.36%
Olga Dubrovina	New People	331	5.31%
Ilya Kozlov	Communists of Russia	265	4.25%
Galina Gribkova	Independent	246	3.95%
Oleg Chernov	Independent	231	3.71%
Yevgenia Sosunova	Communists of Russia	206	3.31%
Stanisalv Petukhovsky	A Just Russia — For Truth	198	3.18%
Dmitry Ryabukha	Independent	145	2.33%
Alina Abazokova	Independent	111	1.78%
Edvard Mustafinov	Communists of Russia	110	1.77%
Sergey Ishutin	Independent	95	1.52%
Khalida Aliyeva	Independent	69	1.11%
Yusif Agadzhanov	Independent	56	0.90%
Total		6,232	100%

Summary of the 9-11 September 2022 Akademichesky District Council of Deputies election in District 2
Candidate	Party	Votes	%
Valentina Zarubina	United Russia	2,545	39.87%
Olga Sheynina	My Raion	2,445	36.58%
Olga Zorina	My Raion	1,675	26.24%
Darya Bagina	Communist Party	1,621	25.40%
Marina Chernogorsteva	My Raion	1,331	20.85%
Aleksandr Tsaregorodtsev	A Just Russia — For Truth	950	14.88%
Aleksandr Kondratenko	Communist Party	857	13.43%
Angelina Karpenko	Yabloko	781	12.24%
Igor Artemyev	Yabloko	709	11.11%
Yulia Maksimova	Yabloko	708	11.09%
Yekaterina Lyzhnikova	Communist Party	587	9.20%
Vladislav Demichev	Independent	478	7.49%
Aleksey Dmitrenko	Communist Party	458	7.18%
Oksana Aysina	A Just Russia — For Truth	439	6.88%
Denis Kucherenko	Liberal Democratic Party	408	6.39%
Diana Volkova	Communists of Russia	346	5.42%
Sergey Butenkov	Liberal Democratic Party	329	5.15%
Aleksandr Pantyukhin	Independent	329	5.15%
Aleksey Tarasov	Independent	204	3.20%
Yakov Simonov	Independent	200	3.13%
Tatyana Babina	Independent	187	2.93%
Ruslan Bogoutdinov	Communists of Russia	161	2.52%
Vladimir Zhuravsky	Independent	161	2.52%
Ivan Dolin	Independent	133	2.08%
Lev Smirnov	Communists of Russia	97	1.52%
Total		6,383	100%

Summary of the 9-11 September 2022 Akademichesky District Council of Deputies election in District 3
Candidate	Party	Votes	%
Svetlana Averyushkina	My Raion	1,800	30.85%
Yevgeny Novitsky	United Russia	1,624	27.84%
Yelena Fisun	My Raion	1,367	23.43%
Irina Rtishcheva	My Raion	1,335	22.88%
Maria Zhadan	Communist Party	1,274	21.84%
Sergey Korobkov	Yabloko	1,164	19.95%
Mikhail Monakhov	Liberal Democratic Party	997	17.09%
Georgy Pobedonostsev	Independent	818	14.02%
Artyom Brynsky	Communist Party	728	12.48%
Nikita Vanyov	Communist Party	659	11.30%
Anna Nadirova	Communist Party	609	10.44%
Anatoly Morozov	Independent	575	9.86%
Nazar Nedzhepov	Independent	435	7.46%
Denis Chazov	New People	419	7.18%
Natalia Zhuravskaya	New People	379	6.50%
Yury Dmitriyev	Independent	366	6.27%
Mikhail Tikhonov	A Just Russia — For Truth	327	5.61%
Oleg Lvov	Communists of Russia	277	4.75%
Yevgeny Malko	New People	246	4.22%
Nikolay Khudyakov	Communists of Russia	228	3.91%
Maria Korzhova	Independent	216	3.70%
Anna Kravchenko	Independent	198	3.39%
Yury Khodos	Independent	190	3.26%
Natalya Rybakova	Communists of Russia	174	2.98%
Svetlana Buzulukova	Independent	145	2.49%
Nikolay Melnikov	Independent	118	2.02%
Roman Chalko	Independent	95	1.63%
Total		5,834	100%

=== Cheryomushki District ===
My Raion won the majority in the Council of Deputies winning 9 seats, while another 3 seats were won by allied United Russia (up from none). Communist Party lost its entire 5-member delegation.

Summary of the 9-11 September 2022 Cheryomushki District Council of Deputies election in District 1
Candidate	Party	Votes	%
Oleg Mikhaylov	United Russia	2,679	41.83%
Andrei Solomatin	My Raion	1,935	30.22%
Aleksey Stepanyuk	My Raion	1,727	26.97%
Sergey Rasstrigin	My Raion	1,454	22.70%
Aleksandr Krassy	Communist Party	1,176	18.36%
Galina Nodinian	Communist Party	1,128	17.61%
Dmitry Vaganov	Communist Party	1,039	16.22%
Sergey Yelagin	Communist Party	909	14.19%
Sergey Chugurov	Liberal Democratic Party	726	11.34%
Yegor Repetey	New People	684	10.68%
Marina Krasikova	Communists of Russia	615	9.60%
Yevgeny Dmitriyev	A Just Russia — For Truth	564	8.81%
Aleksey Kashirsky	A Just Russia — For Truth	547	8.54%
Yashar Gasymov	Independent	502	7.84%
Nikolay Amelin	Independent	495	7.73%
Sergey Bogachev	Independent	476	7.43%
Anatoly Yeliseyenko	Communists of Russia	387	6.04%
Total		6,404	100%

Summary of the 9-11 September 2022 Cheryomushki District Council of Deputies election in District 2
Candidate	Party	Votes	%
Valentina Lavrikova (incumbent)	United Russia	2,967	42.03%
Yulia Nazarova (incumbent)	My Raion	2,747	38.91%
Denis Bespalov	My Raion	2,432	34.45%
Aleksandr Lazutkin	My Raion	2,226	31.53%
Aleksandr Russky	Independent	1,261	17.86%
Sergey Sinebryukhov	Communist Party	1,167	16.53%
Yelena Medvedeva	Communist Party	1,148	16.26%
Viktor Sobko	Independent	951	13.47%
Georgy Petrov	Communist Party	884	12.52%
Mikhail Silayev	Communist Party	841	11.91%
Dimitry Dzneladze	Independent	530	7.51%
Eduard Omelchenko	A Just Russia — For Truth	525	7.44%
Vladimir Oskin	Independent	460	6.52%
Oksana Tishkina	Communists of Russia	411	5.82%
Yevdokia Demyanova	Communists of Russia	387	5.48%
Aleksandr Gugelev	Communists of Russia	325	4.60%
Total		7,059	100%

Summary of the 9-11 September 2022 Cheryomushki District Council of Deputies election in District 3
Candidate	Party	Votes	%
Yelena Volgina	United Russia	2,979	45.09%
Andrey Olshevsky	My Raion	2,224	33.66%
Dania Krasilnikova	My Raion	2,116	32.03%
Marina Khegay	My Raion	1,876	28.39%
Aleksandr Usoltsev	New People	1,863	28.20%
Viktoria Rashina	Liberal Democratic Party	1,172	17.74%
Valentin Panferov	Communist Party	1,031	15.60%
Leonid Sadekov	Communist Party	943	14.27%
Sergey Rogachev	Communist Party	929	14.06%
Anna Solukova	Independent	741	11.22%
Anna Levina	Communists of Russia	599	9.07%
Natalia Filatova	Independent	576	8.72%
Yelena Fadeyeva	Liberal Democratic Party	368	5.57%
Tatyana Shvets	Communists of Russia	298	4.51%
Yelena Moskotina	Communists of Russia	289	4.37%
Irina Savoyskaya	Communists of Russia	216	3.27%
Total		6,607	100%

=== Gagarinsky District ===
My Raion won the majority in the Council of Deputies winning 5 seats, while another 4 seats were won by allied United Russia. Yabloko, who previously held all 12 seats on the Council, retained only a single seat.

Summary of the 9-11 September 2022 Gagarinsky District Council of Deputies election in District 1
Candidate	Party	Votes	%
Anastasia Mozgalyova	United Russia	925	29.15%
Tatyana Starkova	My Raion	765	24.11%
Maksim Chirkov	A Just Russia — For Truth	727	22.91%
Grigory Karamkalov	My Raion	678	21.37%
Tatyana Chernomashentseva	Independent	652	20.55%
Dmitry Shapalin	Independent	593	18.69%
Yekaterina Veselovskaya	Independent	541	17.05%
Sergey Gusev	Independent	538	16.96%
Yelena Mil	Independent	410	12.92%
Aleksandr Nikolayenko	Liberal Democratic Party	376	11.85%
Aleksandr Azheganov	A Just Russia — For Truth	263	8.29%
Mikhail Aptekar	Independent	224	7.06%
Nadezhda Lobova	Liberal Democratic Party	193	6.08%
Yury Akimov	Independent	147	4.63%
Sergey Zuyev	Independent	110	3.47%
Stanislav Vagner	Independent	79	2.49%
Akop Ayrumyants	Independent	67	2.11%
Pavel Churunov	Independent	64	2.02%
Ruslan Khaliulin	Independent	57	1.80%
Vladislav Demichev	Independent	54	1.70%
Total		3,173	100%

Summary of the 9-11 September 2022 Gagarinsky District Council of Deputies election in District 2
Candidate	Party	Votes	%
Pavel Konyshev	United Russia	954	28.09%
Viktoria Lisnik	My Raion	866	25.50%
Margarita Sharipova	Independent	688	20.26%
Anna Desyatova	Independent	672	19.79%
Yelena Melvil	My Raion	643	18.93%
Aleksandra Adamova	New People	630	18.55%
Mikhail Nagribetsky	Independent	577	16.99%
Irina Savina	New People	514	15.14%
Denis Kulakov	New People	490	14.43%
Artyom Langar (incumbent)	Independent	489	14.40%
Aleksandr Verin	Communist Party	293	8.63%
Aleksey Smirnov	Liberal Democratic Party	258	7.60%
Viktoria Parakhina	Independent	168	4.95%
Ksenia Sapogina	A Just Russia — For Truth	150	4.42%
Kristina Budnik	Independent	105	3.09%
Natalia Zykova	Independent	104	3.06%
Ivan Ryabov-Neftestroyevsky	Liberal Democratic Party	98	2.89%
Yury Anisimov	Independent	84	2.47%
Diana Zheleznova	Independent	81	2.39%
Maria Lagutina	Independent	59	1.74%
Ivan Ovchinnikov	Independent	57	1.68%
Yegor Kruglov	Independent	52	1.53%
Total		3,396	100%

Summary of the 9-11 September 2022 Gagarinsky District Council of Deputies election in District 3
Candidate	Party	Votes	%
Yelena Orlova	United Russia	1,445	42.08%
Aleksandr Potapov	My Raion	1,197	34.86%
Olesya Kuzmicheva	My Raion	1,038	30.23%
Yan Davidovich (incumbent)	Independent	938	27.32%
Yulia Maksimova	Independent	748	21.78%
Igor Artemyev	Independent	693	20.18%
Svetlana Zabelina	New People	471	13.72%
Denis Strelkov	Communist Party	313	9.11%
Viktoria Anisimova	Independent	219	6.38%
Leonid Zaytsev	Liberal Democratic Party	218	6.35%
Viktoria Yanko	Independent	177	5.15%
Denis Koshchuk	A Just Russia — For Truth	158	4.60%
Darya Rusakova	Independent	132	3.84%
Lyudmila Chudesnova	Independent	124	3.61%
Galina Surgovito	Independent	108	3.15%
Viktor Sobko	Independent	92	2.68%
Yaroslav Porfiryev	Independent	85	2.48%
Artur Dudnikov	Independent	80	2.33%
Total		3,434	100%

Summary of the 9-11 September 2022 Gagarinsky District Council of Deputies election in District 4
Candidate	Party	Votes	%
Dmitry Monakhov	United Russia	1,343	40.34%
Irina Martynyuk	My Raion	1,044	31.36%
Vladimir Shomin	Yabloko	1,003	30.13%
Irina Tuychiyeva	My Raion	988	29.68%
Viktoria Petrovskaya	Independent	882	26.49%
Aleksandrina Klyuykova	A Just Russia — For Truth	524	15.74%
Svetlana Barinova	Liberal Democratic Party	413	12.41%
Igor Kumanin	Independent	230	6.91%
Aleksandr Pantyukhin	Independent	214	6.43%
Yelena Gilvanova	Independent	198	5.95%
Artyom Khachaturyan	A Just Russia — For Truth	179	5.38%
Valentina Lambanina	Independent	171	5.14%
Pavel Mokhovikov	Independent	157	4.72%
Diana Musabayeva	Independent	87	2.61%
Total		3,329	100%

=== Konkovo District ===
My Raion won the majority in the Council of Deputies winning 12 seats, while other 3 seats were won by allied United Russia (down from 6). Yabloko, who previously held 6 seats on the Council, lost its entire delegation.

Summary of the 9-11 September 2022 Konkovo District Council of Deputies election in District 1
Candidate	Party	Votes	%
Marina Brundukova (incumbent)	United Russia	3,987	40.80%
Yelena Krasnokutskaya	My Raion	3,404	34.83%
Svetlana Shleina	My Raion	2,937	30.06%
Sergey Malakhov (incumbent)	My Raion	2,717	27.80%
Viktor Mikhaylov	My Raion	2,567	26.27%
Aleksandr Isavnin	Communist Party	1,841	18.84%
Dmitry Boldyrev (incumbent)	Yabloko	1,568	16.05%
Marina Zinovyeva (incumbent)	Yabloko	1,322	13.53%
Ivan Lukyanchenkov	Yabloko	1,066	10.91%
Alina Andreyeva	New People	968	9.91%
Olga Zaytseva	Communists of Russia	903	9.24%
Natalia Stepanova	Communist Party	896	9.17%
Ruslan Kozhanov	Liberal Democratic Party	715	7.32%
Aleksey Uretsky	A Just Russia — For Truth	621	6.35%
Maksim Duran	New People	609	6.23%
Kirill Gorlov	New People	588	6.02%
Mark Mordukhayev	Independent	552	5.65%
Svetlana Polyakova	Independent	517	5.29%
Sergey Ryabchenko	Communists of Russia	502	5.14%
Valentina Mukhametova	Communists of Russia	477	4.88%
Ilya Polevoy	New People	469	4.80%
Nikita Polevoy	Independent	455	4.66%
Igor Koba	New People	405	4.14%
Anastasia Zyumlina	Independent	403	4.12%
Natalia Orlova	Independent	373	3.82%
Vladimir Yaroshenko	Independent	298	3.05%
Yevgenia Segodina	Independent	281	2.88%
Total		9,772	100%

Summary of the 9-11 September 2022 Konkovo District Council of Deputies election in District 2
Candidate	Party	Votes	%
Aleksandr Bely	My Raion	3,633	37.54%
Svetlana Bitkova (incumbent)	United Russia	3,287	33.97%
Tatyana Yermolayeva	My Raion	3,095	31.98%
Ksenia Silivanova	My Raion	2,957	30.56%
Natalia Lebedeva	My Raion	2,226	23.00%
Maksim Volkov	Liberal Democratic Party	2,091	21.61%
Aleksey Volkov	Communists of the Capital	1,713	17.70%
Viktor Zelenin	Communist Party	989	10.22%
Vladimir Menshov	New People	945	9.77%
Denis Yakovlev	Independent	889	9.19%
Anastasia Zhukova	Communist Party	871	9.00%
Aleksandr Kalyadin	Independent	828	8.56%
Dmitry Frontov	Communist Party	794	8.21%
Natalya Miletenko	Communists of Russia	777	8.03%
Sergey Ryabinin	Communist Party	770	7.96%
Yevgeny Pliyev	Independent	688	7.11%
Andrey Lyubimov	Liberal Democratic Party	672	6.94%
Yevgeny Kurbatov	Independent	623	6.44%
Yelena Khaylova	Communists of Russia	451	4.66%
Andrey Igonkin	Communists of Russia	438	4.53%
Zhanna Litvinova	Communists of Russia	428	4.42%
Total		9,677	100%

Summary of the 9-11 September 2022 Konkovo District Council of Deputies election in District 3
Candidate	Party	Votes	%
Irina Borisova	My Raion	4,326	44.78%
Natalya Chizhova	United Russia	3,591	37.17%
Milana Nikogosova	My Raion	3,492	36.15%
Aleksey Selezov	My Raion	3,349	34.67%
Yury Menchits	My Raion	2,214	22.92%
Nikita Tokarev	Communist Party	1,717	17.77%
Dmitry Lukyanov	Communists of Russia	1,490	15.42%
Pyotr Myagkov	Communist Party	1,351	13.98%
Vyacheslav Lipchinsky	New People	1,006	10.41%
Irina Shelestova	New People	977	10.11%
Olga Ivanova	Communists of Russia	832	8.61%
Marina Kazarova	Independent	771	7.98%
Alyona Voronkova	Independent	705	7.30%
Semyon Semenchenko	Independent	702	7.27%
Denis Azarko	Communists of Russia	594	6.15%
Irina Matveyeva	Communists of Russia	517	5.35%
Maksim Vorozheykin	Independent	458	4.74%
Svetlana Tokareva	Independent	410	4.24%
Aleksey Kriksunov	Independent	344	3.56%
Aleksey Lysikhin	Independent	292	3.02%
Total		9,661	100%

=== Kotlovka District ===
United Russia retained control over the Council of Deputies but lost one seat to the Communist Party.

Summary of the 9-11 September 2022 Kotlovka District Council of Deputies election in District 1
Candidate	Party	Votes	%
Kirill Goyev	United Russia	2,594	40.57%
Olga Gordiyets	United Russia	2,276	35.60%
Aleksandr Gerasimov (incumbent)	United Russia	2,245	35.11%
Yelena Smyshlyayeva (incumbent)	United Russia	2,194	34.31%
Damir Gafurov	United Russia	1,899	29.70%
Andrey Petrov	Independent	1,244	19.46%
Inna Nikolayeva	Independent	1,032	16.14%
Sergey Buryakov	Independent	1,017	15.91%
Natalya Smoroda	Independent	922	14.42%
Pavel Andreyev	Communist Party	870	13.61%
Fyodor Demyanchuk	Independent	832	13.01%
Yekaterina Prosikova	New People	780	12.20%
Valentin Balash	New People	696	10.89%
Leonid Bespalov	Communist Party	537	8.40%
Mikhail Menshikov	Communist Party	516	8.07%
Margarita Volkova	Independent	459	7.18%
Irina Lobeyeva	Independent	324	5.07%
Aleksandr Sytnik	Communists of Russia	259	4.05%
Vladimir Zobnov	Communists of Russia	249	3.89%
Yury Stolyarov	Independent	247	3.86%
Galina Savicheva	Communists of Russia	221	3.46%
Aleksandr Nikolayev	Independent	212	3.32%
Alina Abazokova	Independent	208	3.25%
Alina Vardiyeva	Communists of Russia	194	3.03%
Yelena Merkulova	Independent	189	2.96%
Yevgeny Ovchinnikov	Communists of Russia	170	2.66%
Total		6,394	100%

Summary of the 9-11 September 2022 Kotlovka District Council of Deputies election in District 2
Candidate	Party	Votes	%
Aleksey Maslennikov (incumbent)	United Russia	2,469	39.25%
Irina Sazonova (incumbent)	United Russia	2,087	33.17%
Gennady Pchelnikov (incumbent)	United Russia	1,954	31.06%
Galina Kostetskaya	Communist Party	1,829	29.07%
Oleg Flegontov	United Russia	1,816	28.87%
Vladimir Vereshchagin (incumbent)	United Russia	1,679	26.69%
Viktoria Anastasova	Independent	1,020	16.21%
Vitaly Bykovsky	New People	976	15.51%
Aleksandr Nikitin	New People	607	9.65%
Andrey Zagaynov	Communist Party	583	9.27%
Aleksandr Grigorenko	Independent	575	9.14%
Yegor Baranov	Communist Party	534	8.49%
Dmitry Frolov	Independent	507	8.06%
Nikolay Tretyak	Communist Party	461	7.33%
Yelena Gorbacheva	Communists of Russia	405	6.44%
Ruslan Khaliulin	Independent	374	5.95%
Anna Ageyeva	Independent	369	5.87%
Margarita Karaseva	Communists of Russia	343	5.45%
Zoya Yakovenko	Communists of Russia	339	5.39%
Aleksandr Zhilyakov	Independent	241	3.83%
Sergey Korneyev	Communists of Russia	235	3.74%
Vadim Mineyev	Communists of Russia	209	3.32%
Total		6,291	100%

=== Lomonosovsky District ===
My Raion won the majority in the Council of Deputies winning 8 seats, while other 2 seats were won by allied United Russia. Yabloko, who previously held 6 seats on the Council, lost its entire delegation, as well as Communist Party which previously held a single seat.

Summary of the 9-11 September 2022 Lomonosovsky District Council of Deputies election in District 1
Candidate	Party	Votes	%
Marina Akatova	My Raion	3,237	39.53%
Yelena Tobina	United Russia	3,144	38.40%
Natalia Dovbenko	My Raion	2,628	32.10%
Andrey Morozov	My Raion	2,266	27.67%
Antonina Makarenko	My Raion	2,064	25.21%
Yury Stroganov	Communist Party	1,597	19.50%
Aleksey Kasyan	Yabloko	1,583	19.33%
Vladimir Kalinin (incumbent)	Yabloko	1,516	18.51%
Olga Shtatskaya (incumbent)	Yabloko	1,489	18.19%
Maria Bogdanova	Yabloko	1,409	17.21%
Mikhail Karpov	New People	1,254	15.32%
Sergey Shuvalov	New People	704	8.60%
Galina Goryacheva	Independent	633	7.73%
Tatyana Borisova	Independent	592	7.23%
Nikita Artyushin	Liberal Democratic Party	570	6.96%
Zoya Shargatova	The Greens	566	6.91%
Marina Rozova	Independent	561	6.85%
Lyubov Yefimova	Independent	503	6.14%
Kirill Gromov	Independent	485	5.92%
Venera Yarullina	Independent	469	5.73%
Galina Slezko	Independent	420	5.13%
Tatyana Kamushkina	Independent	404	4.93%
Elina Timofeyeva	Independent	352	4.30%
Igor Kondakov	Independent	334	4.08%
Sergey Shuvalov	Independent	303	3.70%
Aleksey Kalinin	Independent	294	3.59%
Total		8,188	100%

Summary of the 9-11 September 2022 Lomonosovsky District Council of Deputies election in District 2
Candidate	Party	Votes	%
Irina Bogdanova	My Raion	3,488	42.01%
Irina Baburina (incumbent)	My Raion	3,458	41.65%
Yulia Kuzemina (incumbent)	United Russia	2,988	35.99%
Yelena Trushina	My Raion	2,141	25.79%
Tamara Novikova	My Raion	2,091	25.18%
Vitaly Voytsekhovich	New People	1,883	22.68%
Olga Krylova	Yabloko	1,483	17.86%
Anastasia Kolesova	Independent	1,323	15.93%
Yevgeny Zykov	Communist Party	1,118	13.47%
Inga Bogdanova	Yabloko	976	11.75%
Alyona Litvinenko	Liberal Democratic Party	761	9.17%
Georgy Luchinkin	New People	588	7.08%
Yelena Knyazeva	Independent	570	6.86%
Sergey Kvetkin	Independent	555	6.68%
Dmitry Kondakov	Independent	543	6.54%
Sergey Minin	Independent	496	5.97%
Aleksandr Kobrinsky	Independent	478	5.76%
Igor Tarasenkov	Independent	429	5.17%
Anton Umnikov	Independent	400	4.82%
Mikhail Makhotkin	Independent	344	4.14%
Total		8,303	100%

=== Obruchevsky District ===
My Raion won the majority in the Council of Deputies winning 7 seats, while other 2 seats were won by allied United Russia (down from 10 seats). One seat flipped to the Communist Party.

Summary of the 9-11 September 2022 Obruchevsky District Council of Deputies election in District 1
Candidate	Party	Votes	%
Anna Belova	My Raion	3,155	45.72%
Vasily Smetlev (incumbent)	United Russia	2,811	40.74%
Zinaida Bufetova (incumbent)	My Raion	2,423	35.12%
Andrey Kopeykin	My Raion	2,376	34.43%
Aleksandr Dudkin	My Raion	1,777	25.75%
Roman Konovalov	New People	1,425	20.65%
Anatoly Titov	New People	1,227	17.78%
Pyotr Andreyenko	Communist Party	998	14.46%
Aleksandr Nekrasov	A Just Russia — For Truth	792	11.48%
Aleksandra Gartman	Independent	751	10.88%
Igor Miroshnichenko	Independent	438	6.35%
Vadim Vladimirenko	Independent	416	6.03%
Timofey Pryakhin	Independent	383	5.55%
Oleg Shibayev	Independent	373	5.41%
Roman Kryuchkov	Independent	333	4.83%
Vladimir Zaychenko	Independent	287	4.16%
Magomed Rasulov	A Just Russia — For Truth	286	4.14%
Ivan Kuznetsov	Independent	267	3.87%
Mikhail Yeremin	Independent	254	3.68%
Yury Lyapin	Independent	239	3.46%
Levon Azizyan	Independent	220	3.19%
Total		6,900	100%

Summary of the 9-11 September 2022 Obruchevsky District Council of Deputies election in District 2
Candidate	Party	Votes	%
Olga Vladimirova	My Raion	3,237	42.27%
Vladimir Romanov (incumbent)	United Russia	3,158	41.24%
Yelena Norenko (incumbent)	My Raion	2,835	37.02%
Kirill Lugovskoy	My Raion	2,605	34.02%
Roman Galenkin	Communist Party	2,196	28.68%
Andrey Besshtanko	My Raion	2,187	28.56%
Danil Dorchenkov	New People	1,609	21.01%
Sergey Makoveyev	New People	1,140	14.89%
Maksim Myslivchik	Liberal Democratic Party	779	10.17%
Svetlana Smolina	Independent	732	9.56%
Leonid Smekalov	Independent	672	8.78%
Anatoly Yevseyev	Independent	492	6.42%
Yelizaveta Zhuravleva	Independent	490	6.40%
Yury Grigoryan	Independent	430	5.62%
Anna Katysheva	Independent	382	4.99%
Vladimir Yaroshenko	Independent	354	4.62%
Maksim Kuzmichev	Independent	245	3.20%
David Dzhalagonia	Independent	198	2.59%
Diana Musabayeva	Independent	128	1.67%
Total		7,658	100%

=== Severnoye Butovo District ===
United Russia retained control over the Council of Deputies but lost one seat to the New People.

Summary of the 9-11 September 2022 Severnoye Butovo District Council of Deputies election in District 1
Candidate	Party	Votes	%
Irina Kolosova	United Russia	3,757	38.13%
Marina Koshkina	United Russia	3,486	35.38%
Aleksey Kislov	United Russia	3,190	32.38%
Nikolay Tutrin (incumbent)	United Russia	2,574	26.12%
Danil Petrov	New People	2,447	24.84%
Ruslan Lekov (incumbent)	United Russia	2,272	23.06%
Aleksandr Bogunov	Communist Party	1,502	15.24%
Aleksey Astakhov	Independent	1,191	12.09%
Dmitry Belousov	Independent	1,133	11.50%
Aleksandr Ivanov	Communist Party	1,095	11.11%
Sergey Smirnov	Communists of Russia	1,069	10.85%
Vadim Savkin	Communists of Russia	967	9.81%
Pavel Derbin	A Just Russia — For Truth	942	9.56%
Dmitry Lyubimov	A Just Russia — For Truth	852	8.65%
Vladislav Tarasov	Communists of Russia	692	7.02%
Zinaida Sosenkina	A Just Russia — For Truth	659	6.69%
Dmitry Danilenko	Independent	541	5.49%
Aleksandr Novikov	Independent	527	5.35%
Vladimir Baranov	Communists of Russia	496	5.03%
Vladimir Gribanov	Independent	496	5.03%
Alina Baranova	Communists of Russia	484	4.91%
Igor Lovyagin	Independent	345	3.50%
Vagiv Balakishiyev	Independent	265	2.69%
Total		9,853	100%

Summary of the 9-11 September 2022 Severnoye Butovo District Council of Deputies election in District 2
Candidate	Party	Votes	%
Vera Ilyukhina (incumbent)	United Russia	4,144	38.73%
Yelena Baranovskaya (incumbent)	United Russia	3,756	35.10%
Aleksey Kurbatov (incumbent)	United Russia	3,191	29.82%
Aleksandr Trost (incumbent)	United Russia	2,997	28.01%
Olga Lesayeva (incumbent)	United Russia	2,941	27.49%
Sofya Bezmenova	Independent	2,094	19.57%
Veronika Koneva	A Just Russia — For Truth	1,634	15.27%
Valery Kashin	A Just Russia — For Truth	1,303	12.18%
Vadim Samichev	Independent	1,228	11.48%
Alyona Pashina	Independent	1,171	10.94%
Yaroslav Sidorov	Communists of Russia	1,136	10.62%
Roksana Tumanova	A Just Russia — For Truth	1,038	9.70%
Vadim Shestakov	Independent	993	9.28%
Vladislav Volkov	Independent	652	6.09%
Darya Rusakova	Independent	514	4.80%
Yevgeny Movchan	Independent	494	4.62%
Damir Garayev	Independent	466	4.36%
Roman Dodonov	Independent	462	4.32%
Nail Bedretdinov	Independent	447	4.18%
Yevgeny Kuzmin	Independent	428	4.00%
Regina Smirnova	Independent	384	3.59%
Daniil Sukhorebrov	Independent	309	2.89%
Ilyas Shageyev	Independent	209	1.95%
Varta Khachaturyan	Independent	200	1.87%
Tadeush Hwang	Independent	184	1.72%
Total		10,700	100%

=== Tyoply Stan District ===
United Russia retained control over the Council of Deputies, winning all 12 seats.

Summary of the 9-11 September 2022 Tyoply Stan District Council of Deputies election in District 1
Candidate	Party	Votes	%
Yelena Gurova (incumbent)	United Russia	3,529	41.59%
Vera Poznyakova	United Russia	3,395	40.01%
Suren Balachinsky	United Russia	3,332	39.27%
Irina Dautova (incumbent)	United Russia	3,194	37.64%
Yegor Nasonov	A Just Russia — For Truth	1,967	23.18%
Aleksandr Yashin	A Just Russia — For Truth	1,473	17.36%
Viktoria Smetanina	Independent	1,458	17.18%
Svetlana Romanova	Independent	1,271	14.98%
Valery Sotnikov	Independent	1,072	12.63%
Dmitry Shmakov	Independent	909	10.71%
Total		8,485	100%

Summary of the 9-11 September 2022 Tyoply Stan District Council of Deputies election in District 2
Candidate	Party	Votes	%
Sergey Deniskin (incumbent)	United Russia	3,090	36.84%
Larisa Komyagina	United Russia	3,038	36.22%
Vladimir Zhukov (incumbent)	United Russia	3,008	35.87%
Irina Sakharova	United Russia	2,695	32.13%
Stanislav Yermakov	Independent	1,023	12.20%
Andrey Ageyev	Independent	1,003	11.96%
Sergey Novoselov	Independent	962	11.47%
Yelena Skoptsova	Independent	758	9.04%
Tatyana Andreyeva	Independent	751	8.95%
Vladimir Pugayev	Independent	706	8.42%
Valery Lamykin	Independent	703	8.38%
Zakhar Astafyev	Independent	699	8.33%
Aleksandr Levchenkov	Independent	628	7.49%
Sergey Antonov	Independent	482	5.75%
Sergey Ryazanov	Independent	412	4.91%
Pavel Smirnov	Independent	412	4.91%
Dmitry Faleyev	Independent	398	4.75%
Maksim Vorozheykin	Independent	372	4.44%
Aleksey Lukashev	Independent	286	3.41%
Total		8,397	100%

Summary of the 9-11 September 2022 Tyoply Stan District Council of Deputies election in District 3
Candidate	Party	Votes	%
Yelena Kuzmenko (incumbent)	United Russia	3,514	40.83%
Aram Ayrapetyan	United Russia	3,268	37.97%
Aleksey Smolyakov	United Russia	2,992	34.76%
Oleg Chernushevich (incumbent)	United Russia	2,913	33.84%
Yury Pozdneyev	Independent	1,220	14.17%
Yekaterina Amosova	New People	1,107	12.86%
Aleksandr Novikov	New People	987	11.47%
Yelena Fedorova	Independent	928	10.78%
Darya Petrova	Independent	821	9.54%
Aleksandr Bopp	New People	756	8.78%
Sergey Komarov	Independent	753	8.75%
Klavdia Golovina	Independent	741	8.61%
Sergey Shapovalov	Independent	673	7.82%
Darya Bezmaternykh	Independent	636	7.39%
Andrey Sobolev	Independent	611	7.10%
Vladimir Baranov	Independent	466	5.41%
Total		8,607	100%

=== Yasenevo District ===
United Russia retained control over the Council of Deputies but lost a single seat to New People.

Summary of the 9-11 September 2022 Yasenevo District Council of Deputies election in District 1
Candidate	Party	Votes	%
Irina Grishina (incumbent)	United Russia	4,794	39.97%
Yevgeny Dering (incumbent)	United Russia	4,647	38.75%
Nikolay Mansurov	United Russia	4,383	36.55%
Anton Nikolayev (incumbent)	United Russia	3,142	26.20%
Pyotr Tikhonov	Independent	1,669	13.92%
Yelena Medvedeva	Communist Party	1,575	13.13%
Anton Polosin	Communist Party	1,455	12.13%
Mikhail Silayev	Communist Party	1,395	11.63%
Aleksandr Filatov	Communists of Russia	1,303	10.86%
Pavel Solovey	Independent	1,276	10.64%
Svetlana Khlebushkina	Independent	1,265	10.55%
Ivan Butrinov	Independent	1,175	9.80%
Dimitry Ivanov	Independent	912	7.60%
Natalia Glukhareva	Communists of Russia	742	6.19%
Lilia Smirnova	Independent	600	5.00%
Maria Moiseyeva	Communists of Russia	574	4.79%
Sergey Antonov	Independent	565	4.71%
Larisa Serebryakova	Independent	561	4.68%
Igor Vasin	Independent	460	3.84%
Bekzot Rozaliyev	Communist Party	414	3.45%
Kristina Mosolova	Communists of Russia	389	3.24%
Yulia Yakupova	Independent	343	2.86%
Darya Rusakova	Independent	311	2.59%
Oleg Ustinovich	Independent	301	2.51%
Yegor Kruglov	Independent	264	2.20%
Kirill Solovyev	Independent	173	1.44%
Total		11,993	100%

Summary of the 9-11 September 2022 Yasenevo District Council of Deputies election in District 2
Candidate	Party	Votes	%
Maya Bucharskaya	United Russia	4,311	34.23%
Valery Dashko	United Russia	4,151	32.96%
Tatyana Dzhedzheya (incumbent)	United Russia	3,882	30.82%
Dmitry Fedorovsky (incumbent)	United Russia	3,397	26.97%
Irina Ilyicheva	Communist Party	2,377	18.87%
Natalya Komkova	Independent	2,116	16.80%
Margarita Ivanova	Communist Party	1,712	13.59%
Aleksey Zotov	Communist Party	1,553	12.33%
Nikolay Kodolov	Independent	1,439	11.43%
Andrey Tryanin	Communist Party	1,371	10.89%
Yevgeny Kamenev	Independent	1,187	9.42%
Denis Ippolitov	New People	1,112	8.83%
Danil Kunitsa	New People	1,008	8.00%
Svetlana Yefimova	Independent	814	6.46%
Vadim Petrov	Independent	807	6.41%
Boris Ledenev	Communists of Russia	689	5.47%
Kristina Iyerusalimova	Independent	649	5.15%
Yevgeny Pliyev	Independent	609	4.84%
Zurab Zurbayev	Independent	436	3.46%
Anastasia Kazmirova	Communists of Russia	410	3.26%
Irina Murashova	Communists of Russia	378	3.00%
Total		12,595	100%

Summary of the 9-11 September 2022 Yasenevo District Council of Deputies election in District 3
Candidate	Party	Votes	%
Olga Gorokhova (incumbent)	United Russia	4,860	41.72%
Oksana Ignatovskaya	United Russia	4,545	39.02%
Maksim Zharkov	New People	3,985	34.21%
Olga Shaina (incumbent)	United Russia	3,358	28.83%
Pyotr Yusov	Communist Party	3,319	28.49%
Aleksey Beloyedov	United Russia	2,189	18.79%
Sergey Kaptyug	Communist Party	1,548	13.29%
Nikita Baranovsky	New People	1,232	10.58%
Vladimir Golenev	Communist Party	1,162	9.98%
Oksana Vanina	Independent	943	8.10%
Sergey Lukyanov	Communists of Russia	823	7.07%
Aleksandr Shurin	Independent	686	5.89%
Nikita Borisov	Independent	660	5.67%
Sergey Demin	Independent	573	4.92%
Yelena Matyushina	Communists of Russia	539	4.63%
Zifa Yakubova	Communists of Russia	348	2.99%
Kirill Aintsev	Independent	302	2.59%
Aleksey Tkebuchava	Independent	196	1.68%
Total		11,648	100%

=== Yuzhnoye Butovo District ===
United Russia retained control over the Council of Deputies, winning all 12 seats.

Summary of the 9-11 September 2022 Yuzhnoye Butovo District Council of Deputies election in District 1
Candidate	Party	Votes	%
Larisa Zernichenko (incumbent)	United Russia	6,141	36.43%
Seda Beglyarova (incumbent)	United Russia	6,063	35.97%
Anna Postnikova	United Russia	5,816	34.51%
Iraida Merzlikina	United Russia	5,534	32.83%
Denis Kopyrin	New People	2,301	13.65%
Konstantin Shestakov	Liberal Democratic Party	2,201	13.06%
Lyudmila Pechenkina	Communist Party	2,071	12.29%
Nikita Gorshkov	Liberal Democratic Party	1,643	9.75%
Vladislav Vorobyev	Communist Party	1,642	9.74%
Kirill Stavrovsky	A Just Russia — For Truth	1,637	9.71%
Yegor Stepanov	Independent	1,530	9.08%
Valeria Alekseyeva	Independent	1,280	7.59%
Igor Bakhtinov	Independent	1,118	6.63%
Darya Avdeyeva	Independent	1,078	6.40%
Yelena Mikhaylova	Communists of Russia	989	5.87%
Alyona Appolonova	Independent	800	4.75%
Vadim Ovsyannikov	Independent	771	4.57%
Andrey Bobrov	Independent	758	4.50%
Alyona Titova	Independent	597	3.54%
Nikita Chemrov	Communists of Russia	468	2.78%
Anton Tomozov	Communists of Russia	420	2.49%
Svetlana Tabagua	Independent	325	1.93%
Total		16,855	100%

Summary of the 9-11 September 2022 Yuzhnoye Butovo District Council of Deputies election in District 2
Candidate	Party	Votes	%
Lyubov Yegorova	United Russia	7,558	44.89%
Yelena Osennyaya (incumbent)	United Russia	7,004	41.60%
Natalia Koginova	United Russia	6,480	38.49%
Aleksandr Matiyevich	United Russia	5,459	32.43%
Vladislav Nechayev	A Just Russia — For Truth	2,034	12.08%
Oksana Chemodeyeva	New People	1,687	10.02%
Olga Ivantsova	Independent	1,588	9.43%
Yelzaveta Arkhipenkova	Independent	1,509	8.96%
Dmitry Komarov	Liberal Democratic Party	1,430	8.49%
Vladimir Stepanov	Communists of Russia	1,380	8.20%
Olga Tomozova	Communists of Russia	1,180	7.01%
Ilnura Fayzullina	A Just Russia — For Truth	1,025	6.09%
Irina Sinitsyna	Independent	973	5.78%
Vadim Nikitayev	Liberal Democratic Party	917	5.45%
Sofya Kruglova	Communists of Russia	803	4.77%
Maria Nikitayeva	Communists of Russia	797	4.73%
Vadim Shvadchenko	Independent	669	3.97%
Vladimir Yaroshenko	Independent	636	3.78%
Yelena Shadchina	Independent	416	2.47%
Aleksey Sherikhov	Independent	398	2.36%
Ani Tabidze	Independent	251	1.49%
Total		16,835	100%

Summary of the 9-11 September 2022 Yuzhnoye Butovo District Council of Deputies election in District 3
Candidate	Party	Votes	%
Dmitry Gessler (incumbent)	United Russia	8,454	44.76%
Olga Timofeyeva (incumbent)	United Russia	7,128	37.74%
Pavel Golubtsov (incumbent)	United Russia	7,109	37.64%
Yekaterina Yakubina	United Russia	6,794	35.97%
Vsevolod Agafonov	Communist Party	2,465	13.05%
Aleksey Panov	Independent	1,867	9.89%
Maksim Shatrov	New People	1,745	9.24%
Vitaly Katayev	New People	1,484	7.86%
Sergey Noginov	Liberal Democratic Party	1,455	7.70%
Vitaly Kutovoy	Communist Party	1,377	7.29%
Mikhail Matveyev	Communist Party	1,280	6.78%
Artur Cherednichenko	A Just Russia — For Truth	1,166	6.17%
Sergey Roslov	Independent	1,140	6.04%
Polina Mashkovskaya	Independent	1,119	5.92%
Oksana Yelizarova	Communists of Russia	845	4.47%
Irina Bezborodko	Independent	808	4.28%
Aleksey Mosunov	Independent	782	4.14%
Valery Chudakov	Communists of Russia	16,317	6.45%
Oksana Oleneva	Independent	765	4.05%
Vladimir Saberov	Independent	622	3.29%
Yulia Pugacheva	Communists of Russia	614	3.25%
Rudolf Ambaryan	Communist Party	559	2.96%
Yelena Tikhonova	Independent	540	2.86%
Aleksandr Tomozov	Communists of Russia	338	1.79%
David Abashidze	Independent	247	1.31%
Total		18,887	100%

=== Zyuzino District ===
United Russia won 14 seats and flipped control over the Council of Deputies from Solidarnost-aligned Independents, led by Konstantinas Yankauskas, and Yabloko. One seat was won by the Communist Party.

Summary of the 9-11 September 2022 Zyuzino District Council of Deputies election in District 1
Candidate	Party	Votes	%
Olga Vysotskaya (incumbent)	United Russia	3,431	41.21%
Svetlana Zimina	United Russia	2,663	31.98%
Pavel Rukavitsyn	United Russia	2,510	30.15%
Viktoria Shatova	United Russia	2,473	29.70%
Valentina Yegorycheva	United Russia	1,972	23.68%
Yekaterina Zhimayeva	Liberal Democratic Party	1,862	22.36%
Boris Gurylev (incumbent)	Independent	1,646	19.77%
Maria Savenkova	Independent	1,523	18.29%
Denis Zheleznyakov	Independent	1,427	17.14%
Dmitry Maslennikov	Independent	1,027	12.33%
Maksim Poletkov	Communists of Russia	835	10.03%
Yelizaveta Shikova	Independent	644	7.73%
Valentin Shcherbakov (incumbent)	Independent	626	7.52%
Maria Lagutina	Independent	585	7.03%
Anastasia Nikolayenko	A Just Russia — For Truth	549	6.59%
Tatyana Gavrina	Communists of Russia	533	6.40%
Vladimir Fedorov	Communists of Russia	462	5.55%
Yulia Khayuts	New People	448	5.38%
Sergey Pudrin	Independent	434	5.21%
Nikolay Filimonov	Independent	416	5.00%
Oksana Fedorova	Communists of Russia	410	4.92%
Larisa Serebryakova	Independent	373	4.48%
Yulia Tinazova	Communists of Russia	333	4.00%
Daniil Myslev	Independent	268	3.22%
Maria Yaroshenko	Independent	248	2.98%
Total		8,326	100%

Summary of the 9-11 September 2022 Zyuzino District Council of Deputies election in District 2
Candidate	Party	Votes	%
Viktoria Vladimirova	United Russia	2,478	30.96%
Irina Derevyanko (incumbent)	United Russia	2,419	30.23%
Marina Zhdanova	United Russia	2,335	29.18%
Rimma Kamenova (incumbent)	United Russia	2,196	27.44%
Lilia Skorokhodova	United Russia	2,163	27.03%
Anton Gorokhov	Independent	1,766	22.07%
Vasily Pugachev	Independent	1,726	21.57%
Yelena Volkova	Independent	1,093	13.66%
Svetlana Volkova	Independent	1,035	12.93%
Ivan Logvenchev	Independent	1,030	12.87%
Aleksandr Belyayev	Communist Party	788	9.85%
Yevgeny Maksimovsky	Yabloko	675	8.43%
Akhmed Magomedov	Yabloko	665	8.31%
Alla Terekhova	Liberal Democratic Party	599	7.48%
Rufet Gadzhiyev	Communist Party	590	7.37%
Sergey Stepanov	Independent	513	6.41%
Tatyana Bondareva	Communists of Russia	491	6.14%
Aleksey Volkov	Independent	474	5.92%
Sergey Antonov	Independent	407	5.09%
Viktoria Krapivtseva	Independent	340	4.25%
Maria Lysova	Communists of Russia	335	4.19%
Marina Masyutina	Communists of Russia	332	4.15%
Aleksandra Strugacheva	Independent	318	3.97%
Irina Filippova	Communists of Russia	313	3.91%
Aleksey Tikhonov	Independent	302	3.77%
Yulia Yakupova	Independent	286	3.57%
Irina Volkova	Independent	263	3.29%
Nadezhda Golubeva	Independent	260	3.25%
Aleksandr Ustyugov	Communists of Russia	242	3.02%
Stanislav Tarasenko	Independent	159	1.99%
Total		8,003	100%

Summary of the 9-11 September 2022 Zyuzino District Council of Deputies election in District 3
Candidate	Party	Votes	%
Larisa Kolesnikova	United Russia	2,762	36.09%
Aleksandr Iskhakov	United Russia	2,708	35.38%
Yekaterina Razzakova	United Russia	2,167	28.31%
Olga Lapyko	United Russia	2,139	27.95%
Boris Izrailev	Communist Party	1,955	25.54%
Aleksandr Yakovlev	United Russia	1,777	23.22%
Natalya Chernykh	Independent	1,580	20.64%
Nikolay Nakhayev	Independent	1,288	16.83%
David Markaryan	Independent	1,136	14.84%
Nikita Petrov	Independent	804	10.50%
Oleg Bulayev	Communist Party	747	9.76%
Lilia Smirnova	Independent	667	8.71%
Roman Shuldeshov	Independent	617	8.06%
Galina Aleksanova	Communists of Russia	616	8.05%
Yulia Dobrovolskaya	Independent	581	7.59%
Mikhail Ivanov	Communists of Russia	559	7.30%
Tatyana Zamyatnina	Independent	558	7.29%
Nikolay Girya	Independent	510	6.66%
Alina Mikheyeva	Independent	475	6.21%
Yelena Yevgrafova	Communists of Russia	463	6.05%
Alla Matveycheva	Communists of Russia	415	5.42%
Artyom Sandakov	Communist Party	415	5.42%
Nadezhda Zvereva	Communists of Russia	403	5.27%
Aleksandr Ivankov	Communist Party	392	5.12%
Anastasia Palmina	Independent	255	3.33%
Total		7,654	100%

== Troitsky Administrative Okrug ==
=== Troitsk ===
United Russia won all 20 seats in the Council of Deputies, flipping a single seat previously held by an independent.

Summary of the 9-11 September 2022 Troitsk City Council of Deputies election in District 1
Candidate	Party	Votes	%
Natalia Verigina	United Russia	1,826	50.89%
Irina Savitskaya (incumbent)	United Russia	1,648	45.93%
Aleksandra Rakhmanova	United Russia	1,546	43.09%
Pavel Sokolov	United Russia	1,504	41.92%
Oksana Pavlova	United Russia	1,471	41.00%
Olga Krutko	Communist Party	663	18.48%
Yulia Sharova (incumbent)	Independent	632	17.61%
Irina Krandakova	Communist Party	627	17.47%
Ruslan Rakhimov	Communist Party	483	13.46%
Danila Yanshin	A Just Russia — For Truth	263	7.33%
Andrey Krivko	Independent	243	6.77%
Aleksandr Karakay	A Just Russia — For Truth	198	5.52%
Aleksandr Gerega	A Just Russia — For Truth	190	5.30%
Sabrina Chobanu	A Just Russia — For Truth	144	4.01%
Total		3,588	100%

Summary of the 9-11 September 2022 Troitsk City Council of Deputies election in District 2
Candidate	Party	Votes	%
Andrey Terekhin (incumbent)	United Russia	1,977	50.61%
Yulia Zyuzikova	United Russia	1,886	48.28%
Natalia Maltseva	United Russia	1,658	42.45%
Olga Antonova (incumbent)	United Russia	1,655	42.37%
Olga Mosolova	United Russia	1,373	35.15%
Yegor Pashkin	Independent	865	22.15%
Darya Lyogosteva	Communist Party	753	19.28%
Natalya Krandzel	Communist Party	747	19.12%
Arseny Shabanov	Yabloko	595	15.23%
Nadezhda Leontyeva	Liberal Democratic Party	546	13.98%
Nadezhda Shcherban	New People	364	9.32%
Elina Lebedeva	Independent	349	8.93%
Magomed Nuredinov	A Just Russia — For Truth	276	7.07%
Andrey Rul	A Just Russia — For Truth	227	5.81%
Denis Yasinsky	A Just Russia — For Truth	227	5.81%
Total		3,906	100%

Summary of the 9-11 September 2022 Troitsk City Council of Deputies election in District 3
Candidate	Party	Votes	%
Anatoly Shishonin	United Russia	2,005	48.45%
Tatyana Biryukova	United Russia	1,975	47.73%
Vladimir Klochkov (incumbent)	United Russia	1,889	45.65%
Maksim Pushkov (incumbent)	United Russia	1,864	45.05%
Inna Grishchuk	United Russia	1,805	43.62%
Irina Kostyleva	Independent	1,382	33.40%
Polina Rozynka	Independent	1,134	27.40%
Olga Fastovskaya	Independent	1,031	24.92%
Sergey Nikonorov	A Just Russia — For Truth	625	15.10%
Vladislav Koropets	A Just Russia — For Truth	272	6.57%
Daniil Teplyakov	Independent	263	6.36%
Aleksandr Akatyev	Independent	222	5.36%
Savely Bely	Liberal Democratic Party	209	5.05%
Total		4,138	100%

Summary of the 9-11 September 2022 Troitsk City Council of Deputies election in District 4
Candidate	Party	Votes	%
Andrey Vorobyev	United Russia	2,100	49.01%
Vladimir Blank (incumbent)	United Russia	2,055	47.96%
Oleg Karavichev (incumbent)	United Russia	1,884	43.97%
Yelena Khaustova	United Russia	1,880	43.87%
Aleksey Yertsev	United Russia	1,837	42.87%
Aleksandr Akhramenko	Independent	985	22.99%
Inna Klassen	Communist Party	892	20.82%
Larisa Lugovenko	Communist Party	838	19.56%
Dmitry Prudnikov	Communist Party	814	19.00%
Oleg Pyzhov	Independent	686	16.01%
Natalya Koroleva	A Just Russia — For Truth	455	10.62%
Vitaly Pozdnyakov	A Just Russia — For Truth	398	9.29%
Aleksey Androsov	Independent	335	7.82%
Olga Shirmanova	Liberal Democratic Party	282	6.58%
David Shushtakashvili	Independent	158	3.69%
Total		4,285	100%

== Zelenogradsky Administrative Okrug ==
=== Kryukovo District ===
United Russia retained control over the Council of Deputies with 9 seats, ceding a single seat to the allied My Raion organisation.

Summary of the 9-11 September 2022 Kryukovo District Council of Deputies election in District 1
Candidate	Party	Votes	%
Anatoly Vashchilin (incumbent)	United Russia	6,247	45.01%
Tatyana Smirnova (incumbent)	United Russia	4,999	36.02%
Aleksandr Mikhin	United Russia	4,781	34.45%
Sergey Ovsyannikov (incumbent)	United Russia	4,539	32.71%
Artur Shevello (incumbent)	United Russia	4,057	29.23%
Mikhail Grachev	Communist Party	2,447	17.63%
Andrey Kurochkin	Communist Party	2,105	15.17%
Aleksey Nukrayev	New People	1,939	13.97%
Yulia Kazakova	Liberal Democratic Party	1,588	11.44%
Nadezhda Marchenko	Communist Party	1,406	10.13%
Andrey Leontyev	Communist Party	1,325	9.55%
Aleksandr Netesin	New People	1,210	8.72%
Leonid Kartavtsev	New People	1,130	8.14%
Aleksandra Rasskazova	Communist Party	965	6.95%
Anna Sanches	A Just Russia — For Truth	961	6.92%
Sergey Patrikeyev	Communists of Russia	391	2.82%
Yevgeny Kazachkin	Communists of Russia	370	2.67%
Aleksandr Kologayev	Communists of Russia	326	2.35%
Total		13,878	100%

Summary of the 9-11 September 2022 Kryukovo District Council of Deputies election in District 2
Candidate	Party	Votes	%
Boris Yemelyanov	United Russia	6,178	43.16%
Irina Artemyeva	United Russia	5,810	40.59%
Natalya Fedotova (incumbent)	United Russia	5,173	36.14%
Denis Uvarkin (incumbent)	United Russia	4,236	29.59%
Ivan Potapov	My Raion	4,118	28.77%
Aleksandr Treshchetkin	New People	2,551	17.82%
Sergey Sorokin	Communist Party	2,108	14.73%
Aleksandr Redin	Communist Party	2,065	14.43%
Pavel Mikhaylov	New People	1,870	13.06%
Dmitry Gvaskov	New People	1,770	12.37%
Natalya Selyuk	Communist Party	1,676	11.71%
Yevgeny Arkhipov	Communist Party	1,453	10.15%
Maria Revenko	Communist Party	907	6.34%
Anna Dushatina	Communists of Russia	715	5.00%
Nikita Savutsky	Communists of Russia	397	2.77%
Nikita Sinadsky	Communists of Russia	353	2.47%
Total		14,314	100%

=== Matushkino District ===
United Russia retained control over the Council of Deputies with 7 seats, ceding 3 seats to the allied My Raion organisation.

Summary of the 9-11 September 2022 Matushkino District Council of Deputies election in District 1
Candidate	Party	Votes	%
Svetlana Bystrova	United Russia	2,556	45.59%
Andrey Buchkin	United Russia	2,275	40.57%
Yury Yudakhin	My Raion	2,049	36.54%
Yulia Glukhovshchenko	My Raion	2,023	36.08%
Yekaterina Safokhina	United Russia	1,857	33.12%
Aleksandr Venediktov	Communist Party	1,007	17.96%
Irina Vinogradova	Communist Party	849	15.14%
Ilya Minakov	New People	781	13.93%
Maksim Yezhov	A Just Russia — For Truth	628	11.20%
Yekaterina Zavidova	Communist Party	609	10.86%
Yevgeny Dolzhkevich	Communist Party	590	10.52%
Alyona Vinogradova	Communists of Russia	504	8.99%
Viktoria Leonidova	Communist Party	441	7.87%
Daniil Maksimenko	Liberal Democratic Party	408	7.28%
Lyudmila Grengolm	Communists of Russia	250	4.46%
Nadezhda Kesareva	Communists of Russia	222	3.96%
Total		5,607	100%

Summary of the 9-11 September 2022 Matushkino District Council of Deputies election in District 2
Candidate	Party	Votes	%
Svetlana Doronicheva (incumbent)	United Russia	2,594	49.21%
Yelena Ovchinnikova (incumbent)	United Russia	2,215	42.02%
Stanislav Sadovnikov (incumbent)	United Russia	2,029	38.49%
Anatoly Kuznetsov (incumbent)	My Raion	1,941	36.82%
Alisa Shakurova	United Russia	1,826	34.64%
Svetlana Polyakova	New People	1,138	21.59%
Sergey Bakunichev	Independent	795	15.08%
Dmitry Fedosov	Communist Party	627	11.90%
Aleksandr Zakharov	Communist Party	622	11.80%
Nadezhda Titarenko	A Just Russia — For Truth	591	11.21%
Yelena Golovanikhina	A Just Russia — For Truth	406	7.70%
Ivan Nesterenko	Communist Party	382	7.25%
Mikhail Kotyakhov	Liberal Democratic Party	373	7.08%
Rinat Zheledinov	Communists of Russia	324	6.15%
Aleksandr Romashkin	Communist Party	316	6.00%
Kristina Irugova	Communists of Russia	257	4.88%
Total		5,271	100%

=== Savyolki District ===
United Russia retained control over the Council of Deputies with 8 seats, ceding 2 seats to the allied My Raion organisation.

Summary of the 9-11 September 2022 Savyolki District Council of Deputies election in District 1
Candidate	Party	Votes	%
Oleg Larin (incumbent)	United Russia	2,105	45.22%
Olga Kuznetsova (incumbent)	My Raion	2,011	43.20%
Irina Yudakhina (incumbent)	United Russia	1,925	41.35%
Marina Solovyeva	United Russia	1,919	41.22%
Inna Varfolomeyeva	My Raion	1,828	39.27%
Dmitry Belyakov	A Just Russia — For Truth	806	17.31%
Irina Kiseleva	Communist Party	611	13.13%
Andrey Golyshev	Communist Party	566	12.16%
Pavel Khvostik	New People	564	12.12%
Dmitry Pilyugin	Communist Party	453	9.73%
Yegor Bazulin	Liberal Democratic Party	346	7.43%
Nikita Golovanov	A Just Russia — For Truth	343	7.37%
Vladislav Filin	A Just Russia — For Truth	223	4.79%
Yelena Lvova	Communists of Russia	219	4.70%
Ivan Raychev	Independent	213	4.58%
Yekaterina Lutay	Communists of Russia	199	4.27%
Pavel Bashkatov	Communists of Russia	189	4.06%
Ksenia Sokolova	Communists of Russia	156	3.35%
Dmitry Yerlykov	Communists of Russia	112	2.41%
Total		4,655	100%

Summary of the 9-11 September 2022 Savyolki District Council of Deputies election in District 2
Candidate	Party	Votes	%
Andrey Kursakov (incumbent)	United Russia	1,440	34.78%
Yekaterina Lobanova (incumbent)	United Russia	1,413	34.13%
Alla Silchenkova (incumbent)	United Russia	1,358	32.80%
Maria Stepanova (incumbent)	United Russia	1,334	32.22%
Aleksandr Lebedev	United Russia	1,133	27.37%
Pyotr Zhizhin	Independent	848	20.48%
Yury Antropov	New People	800	19.32%
Andrey Zhukov	Communist Party	554	13.38%
Andrey Shulgin	Independent	501	12.10%
Vladimir Kiyashko	Communist Party	493	11.91%
Sergey Kalyamin	Communist Party	480	11.59%
Gevorik Arutyunyan	New People	381	9.20%
Dmitry Solovyev	Communists of Russia	321	7.75%
Danil Karpov	Independent	309	7.46%
Yelena Bernova	Communists of Russia	308	7.44%
Stanislav Chuprun	Communist Party	293	7.08%
Viktoria Tokareva	A Just Russia — For Truth	241	5.82%
Natalya Kondratyeva	Communists of Russia	188	4.54%
Galina Loseva	Communists of Russia	182	4.40%
Dmitry Zhurzhalin	Communists of Russia	177	4.28%
Rafael Melik-Ovsepyan	A Just Russia — For Truth	154	3.72%
Total		4,140	100%

=== Silino District ===
United Russia retained control over the Council of Deputies with 7 seats, ceding 3 seats to the allied My Raion organisation.

Summary of the 9-11 September 2022 Silino District Council of Deputies election in District 1
Candidate	Party	Votes	%
Yekaterina Kiseleva	United Russia	2,028	42.05%
Leyla Biryukova	My Raion	1,991	41.28%
Anna Yasinova (incumbent)	United Russia	1,864	38.65%
Zhanna Kuznetsova (incumbent)	United Russia	1,837	38.09%
Irina Fomicheva	My Raion	1,418	29.40%
Vladimir Kozin	New People	848	17.58%
Yevgeny Gusev	Communist Party	829	17.19%
Svetlana Nevezhina	A Just Russia — For Truth	771	15.99%
Kirill Yelizarov	Communist Party	599	12.42%
Aleksandr Orlenko	Communist Party	585	12.13%
Marina Dadyko	Independent	493	10.22%
Zoya Mikhaylova	Communists of Russia	449	9.31%
Total		4,823	100%

Summary of the 9-11 September 2022 Silino District Council of Deputies election in District 2
Candidate	Party	Votes	%
Olga Budanova (incumbent)	United Russia	2,303	46.05%
Nadezhda Chelyuskina	United Russia	1,894	37.87%
Irina Runushkina (incumbent)	United Russia	1,803	36.05%
Irina Korkishko	United Russia	1,761	35.21%
Roman Dermansky	My Raion	1,735	34.69%
Oleg Kutuzov	Communist Party	1,042	20.84%
Yevdokia Yelizarova	Communist Party	832	16.64%
Aleksey Krupenenkov	Communist Party	701	14.02%
Roman Taranin	Communist Party	586	11.72%
Yekaterina Korchagina	Communists of Russia	573	11.46%
Oksana Ovcharuk	Communist Party	508	10.16%
Aleksandr Kuleshov	Communists of Russia	360	7.20%
Total		5,001	100%

=== Staroye Kryukovo District ===
United Russia retained control over the Council of Deputies with 8 seats, ceding 2 seats to the allied My Raion organisation.

Summary of the 9-11 September 2022 Staroye Kryukovo District Council of Deputies election in District 1
Candidate	Party	Votes	%
Andrey Slesarev (incumbent)	United Russia	1,718	39.64%
Svetlana Kulak (incumbent)	United Russia	1,680	38.76%
Nikolay Kulin (incumbent)	United Russia	1,537	35.46%
Tatyana Moroz	United Russia	1,443	33.29%
Konkordia Druzhinina	My Raion	1,394	32.16%
Vladimir Golovachev	Communist Party	697	16.08%
Vitaly Yepifanov	New People	577	13.31%
Natalia Stebunova	Communist Party	560	12.92%
Yevgeny Yurin	Communist Party	474	10.94%
Ksenia Zubchenko	Communists of Russia	409	9.44%
Aleksandr Aksenov	Communist Party	365	8.42%
Anna Vishnyakova	Communist Party	345	7.96%
Vera Abankina	Independent	309	7.13%
Dmitry Bulantsov	Independent	304	7.01%
Tatyana Pakhomova	Communists of Russia	219	5.05%
Irina Petrova	Communists of Russia	172	3.97%
Total		4,334	100%

Summary of the 9-11 September 2022 Staroye Kryukovo District Council of Deputies election in District 2
Candidate	Party	Votes	%
Irina Kharitonova	United Russia	1,751	42.19%
Margarita Golovanova (incumbent)	United Russia	1,699	40.94%
Yelena Prokofyeva	United Russia	1,617	38.96%
Vladimir Mokhte (incumbent)	United Russia	1,296	31.23%
Ilyas Yakupov	My Raion	1,199	28.89%
Andrey Borshchenko	New People	926	22.31%
Sergey Filatov	New People	858	20.67%
Anna Tokareva	Communist Party	670	16.14%
Nikita Tonkikh	Communist Party	570	13.73%
Oleg Abaimov	Communists of Russia	547	13.18%
Artyom Lyovin	Communist Party	527	12.70%
Maksim Chuvakhin	Liberal Democratic Party	420	10.12%
Total		4,150	100%
