= Krasnoselsk =

Krasnoselsk may refer to:

- Krasnoselsk, Russia, name of several rural localities in Russia
- Krasnoselsk, former name of Chambarak, Armenia
- Krasnoselsk, former name of Qara Nuru, Azerbaijan

== See also ==
- Krasnoselsky (disambiguation)
