= Krasnoselsk, Russia =

Krasnoselsk (Russian: Красносе́льск) is the name of several rural localities in Russia:

- Krasnoselsk, Altai Republic, a selo in Choysky District of the Altai Republic
- Krasnoselsk, Ulyanovsk Oblast, a settlement in Novospassky District of Ulyanovsk Oblast
