= Krasnoselsky =

Krasnoselsky (masculine), Krasnoselskaya (feminine), or Krasnoselskoye (neuter) may refer to:

- Mark Krasnosel'skii (1920–1997), Russian/Ukrainian mathematician
- Vadim Krasnoselsky (born 1970), Transnistrian politician
- Krasnoselsky District, several districts in Russia
- Krasnoselsky (inhabited locality) (Krasnoselskaya, Krasnoselskoye), several inhabited localities in Russia
- Krasnoselskaya, a station of the Moscow Metro, Moscow, Russia

== See also ==
- Krasnoselsk (disambiguation)
- Krasnoye Selo (inhabited locality)
