= Krasnoselsk, Altai Republic =

Krasnoselsk Красносельск
- Village
- Location within Altai Republic Location within Russia
- Coordinates: 51°48′N 86°47′E
- Country: Russia
- Region: Altai Republic
- District: Choysky District
- Time zone: UTC+7:00

Krasnoselsk (Russian: Красносельск) is a rural locality (a selo) in Ynyrginskoye Rural Settlement of Choysky District, the Altai Republic, Russia. The population was 228 as of 2016. There are 7 streets.

== Geography ==
Krasnoselsk is located 39 km southeast of Choya (the district's administrative centre) by road. Ynyrga is the nearest rural locality.

== Ethnicity ==
The village is inhabited by Altaians, Kazakhs.
