= Krasnoselsky District =

Location of Moscow in Russia

Location of Saint Petersburg in Russia

Location of Kostroma Oblast in Russia

Krasnoselsky District is the name of several administrative and municipal districts in Russia.

- Krasnoselsky District, Moscow, a district in Central Administrative Okrug of the federal city of Moscow
- Krasnoselsky District, Saint Petersburg, an administrative district of the federal city of St. Petersburg
- Krasnoselsky District, Kostroma Oblast, an administrative and municipal district of Kostroma Oblast

== See also ==
- Krasnoselsky (disambiguation)
- Krasnoye Selo (inhabited locality)
