= Balashov constituency =

Russian legislative constituency

Balashov single-member constituency
- Constituency of the Russian State Duma

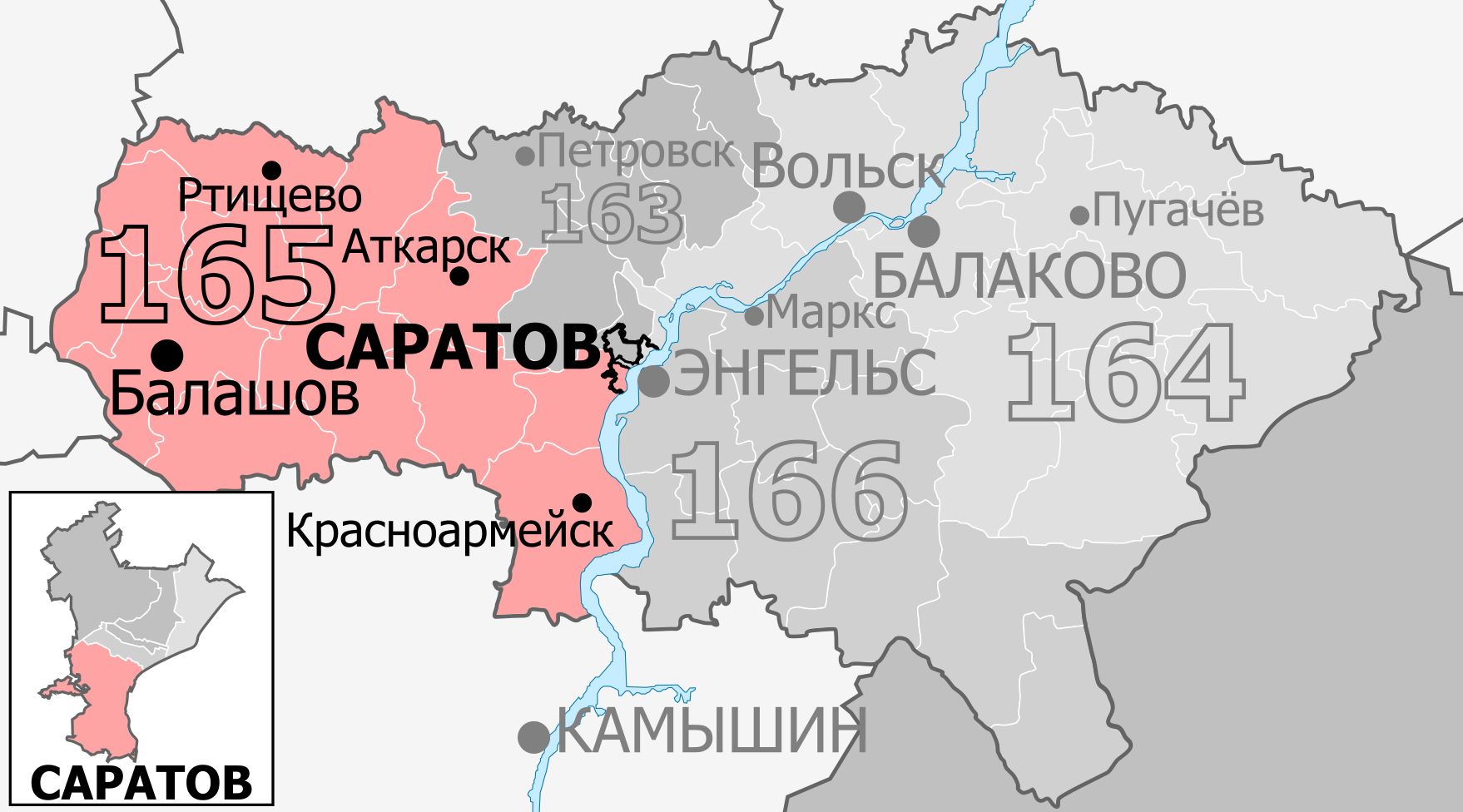
- Constituency boundaries since 2016
- Deputy: Nikolay Pankov; United Russia
- Federal subject: Saratov Oblast
- Districts: Saratov (Zavodskoy), Arkadaksky, Atkarsky, Balashovsky, Gagarinsky (Note: part of Saratov) (Aleksandrovka, Avdeyevka, Babanovka, Bagayevka, Belenky, Berezina Rechka, Burki Station, Burkin Buyerak, Bykovka, Central Farmstead of the "15th Anniversary of the October" sovkhoz, Formosovo, Goryuchka Station, Ivanovsky, Kalashnikov, Khmelevka, Khmelevsky, Kokurino, Kolotov Buyerak, Konstantinovka, Kozlakovka, Krasny Oktyabr, Krasny Tekstilshchik, Krutets, Makhino, Malaya Rybka, Mayak, Mikhaylovka, Novoaleksandrovka, Peschany Umet, Popovka, Pudovkino, Reynik, Rybushka, Sbrodovka, Selkhoztekhnika, Sergiyevsky, Shiroky Buyerak, Sininkiye, Sosnovka, Teplichny, Treshchikha, Verkhny Kurdyum, Vlasovsky, Vlasovsky Station, Vodnik, Vyazovka Yeremeyevka, Yeseyevka, Yurlovka, Yuryevka, Zlobovka) Yekaterinovsky, Kalininsky, Krasnoarmeysky, Lysogorsky, Romanovsky, Rtishchevsky, Samoylovsky, Turkovsky
- Voters: 422,722 (2026)

The Balashov constituency (No.166 (Note: No.156 in 1993–1995, No.157 in 1995–2007, No.165 in 2016–2026)) is a Russian legislative constituency in Saratov Oblast. The constituency covers southern Saratov, its suburbs as well as mostly rural western Saratov Oblast, including the towns Balashov, Atkarsk, Krasnoarmeysk and Rtishchevo.

The constituency has been represented since 2026 by United Russia deputy Nikolay Pankov, five-term State Duma member and former aide to Vyacheslav Volodin, who won the open seat, succeeding one-term United Russia incumbent Andrey Vorobiev.

== Boundaries ==
1993–2007: Arkadaksky District, Atkarsky District, Balashovsky District, Baltaysky District, Bazarno-Karabulaksky District, Kalininsky District, Krasnoarmeysky District, Lysogorsky District, Novoburassky District, Petrovsky District, Romanovsky District, Rtishchevsky District, Samoylovsky District, Svetly, Tatishchevsky District, Turkovsky District, Yekaterinovsky District
The constituency covered predominantly rural western Saratov Oblast, including Saratov exurbs, agroindustrial towns Balashov, Atkarsk and Rtishchevo, small manufacturing towns Krasnoarmeysk and Petrovsk.

2016–present: Arkadaksky District, Atkarsky District, Balashovsky District, Gagarinsky District (Aleksandrovka, Avdeyevka, Babanovka, Bagayevka, Belenky, Berezina Rechka, Burki Station, Burkin Buyerak, Bykovka, Central Farmstead of the "15th Anniversary of the October" sovkhoz, Formosovo, Goryuchka Station, Ivanovsky, Kalashnikov, Khmelevka, Khmelevsky, Kokurino, Kolotov Buyerak, Konstantinovka, Kozlakovka, Krasny Oktyabr, Krasny Tekstilshchik, Krutets, Makhino, Malaya Rybka, Mayak, Mikhaylovka, Novoaleksandrovka, Peschany Umet, Popovka, Pudovkino, Reynik, Rybushka, Sbrodovka, Selkhoztekhnika, Sergiyevsky, Shiroky Buyerak, Sininkiye, Sosnovka, Teplichny, Treshchikha, Verkhny Kurdyum, Vlasovsky, Vlasovsky Station, Vodnik, Vyazovka Yeremeyevka, Yeseyevka, Yurlovka, Yuryevka, Zlobovka), Kalininsky District, Krasnoarmeysky District, Lysogorsky District, Romanovsky District, Rtishchevsky District, Samoylovsky District, Saratov (Zavodskoy), Turkovsky District, Yekaterinovsky District
The constituency was re-created for the 2016 election and retained most of its former territory, losing north-central Saratov Oblast to Saratov constituency. This seat gained Zavodskoy City District of Saratov from Saratov constituency as well as the city south-western suburbs from Engels constituency.

== Members elected ==
Election	Member	Party
1993	Andrey Dorovskikh	Liberal Democratic Party
1995	Zoya Oykina	Communist Party
1999	Oleg Korgunov	Our Home – Russia
2003	Pyotr Kamshilov	United Russia
2007	Proportional representation - no elections by constituency	
2011	Proportional representation - no elections by constituency	
2016	Mikhail Isayev (Note: appointed acting Mayor of Saratov in October 2017)	United Russia
2018	Yevgeny Primakov Jr. (Note: appointed Head of Rossotrudnichestvo in June 2020)	United Russia
2021	Andrey Vorobiev	United Russia
2026	Nikolay Pankov	United Russia

== Election results ==
=== 1993 ===
Summary of the 12 December 1993 Russian legislative election in the Balashov constituency
Candidate	Party	Votes	%
Andrey Dorovskikh	Liberal Democratic Party	87,621	28.27%
Konstantin Kondratyev	Yavlinsky—Boldyrev—Lukin	83,810	27.04%
Vladimir Isayev	Independent	62,131	20.04%
against all		55,183	17.80%
Total		309,977	100%

=== 1995 ===
Summary of the 17 December 1995 Russian legislative election in the Balashov constituency
Candidate	Party	Votes	%
Zoya Oykina	Communist Party	112,381	33.21%
Valery Davydov	Bloc '89	55,505	16.40%
Andrey Dorovskikh (incumbent)	Liberal Democratic Party	34,583	10.22%
Nikolay Sukhoy	Agrarian Party of Russia	31,396	9.28%
Valery Kurnayev	Our Home – Russia	27,391	8.09%
Viktor Ukhanyov	Communists and Working Russia - for the Soviet Union	17,912	5.29%
Renat Bayguzin	Independent	7,761	2.29%
Sergey Mukhtarov	Russian Lawyers' Association	6,584	1.94%
Vitaly Yegorov	Forward, Russia!	6,262	1.85%
Vladimir Laptev	Beer Lovers Party	3,580	1.06%
Aleksandr Timoshok	Social Democrats	2,781	0.82%
against all		27,231	8.05%
Total		338,375	100%

=== 1999 ===
Summary of the 19 December 1999 Russian legislative election in the Balashov constituency
Candidate	Party	Votes	%
Oleg Korgunov	Our Home – Russia	147,998	42.93%
Vyacheslav Mikhaylov	Communist Party	108,574	31.49%
Aleksey Bezrukikh	Andrei Nikolayev and Svyatoslav Fyodorov Bloc	24,476	7.10%
Zoya Oykina (incumbent)	Russian Socialist Party	12,611	3.66%
Nikolay Lukin	Independent	11,050	3.21%
against all		33,057	9.59%
Total		344,747	100%

=== 2003 ===
Summary of the 7 December 2003 Russian legislative election in the Balashov constituency
Candidate	Party	Votes	%
Pyotr Kamshilov	United Russia	126,339	42.22%
Viktor Volkov	Communist Party	55,338	18.49%
Oleg Korgunov (incumbent)	People's Party	43,056	14.39%
Aleksandr Vetrov	Union of Right Forces	24,118	8.06%
Vladimir Skachek	Liberal Democratic Party	7,249	2.42%
Nadezhda Nesterova	United Russian Party Rus'	3,738	1.25%
Sergey Bolganov	Independent	2,439	0.82%
Spartak Stepanov	Party of Russia's Rebirth-Russian Party of Life	2,190	0.73%
Valery Seryapin	Independent	1,286	0.43%
against all		28,565	9.55%
Total		299,254	100%

=== 2016 ===
Summary of the 18 September 2016 Russian legislative election in the Balashov constituency
Candidate	Party	Votes	%
Mikhail Isayev	United Russia	163,931	53.71%
Olga Alimova	Communist Party	42,839	14.04%
Svetlana Martynova	Liberal Democratic Party	31,727	10.40%
Galina Platoshina	A Just Russia	27,791	9.11%
Yury Gavrilichev	Communists of Russia	12,448	4.08%
Vyacheslav Shcherbakov	Rodina	7,383	2.42%
Ilya Kozlyakov	Yabloko	5,500	1.80%
Anna Kupets	The Greens	4,826	1.58%
Dmitry Ignatyev	People's Freedom Party	4,149	1.36%

=== 2018 ===
Summary of the 9 September 2018 Russian by-election in the Balashov constituency
Candidate	Party	Votes	%
Yevgeny Primakov	United Russia	104,227	65.15%
Yelena Shanina	Communists of Russia	18,481	11.55%
Stanislav Denisenko	Liberal Democratic Party	11,575	7.24%
Nadezhda Skvortsova	A Just Russia	9,722	6.08%
Yelena Chervyakova	Party of Pensioners	6,505	4.07%
Ilya Kozlyakov	Yabloko	2,312	1.45%
Sergey Slepchenko	Independent	1,590	0.99%
Total		159,985	100%

=== 2021 ===
Summary of the 17-19 September 2021 Russian legislative election in the Balashov constituency
Candidate	Party	Votes	%
Andrey Vorobiev	United Russia	121,326	52.50%
Nikolay Bondarenko	Communist Party	67,352	29.14%
Dmitry Arkhipov	Communists of Russia	7,861	3.40%
Oleg Meshcheryakov	Liberal Democratic Party	6,851	2.96%
Sergey Gromyko	Party of Pensioners	6,382	2.76%
Aleksandr Fedorchenko	A Just Russia — For Truth	6,364	2.75%
Vladimir Morozov	New People	4,409	1.91%
Sergey Demin	Rodina	2,604	1.13%
Ilya Kozlyakov	Yabloko	1,404	0.61%
Total		231,098	100%

=== 2026 ===
Summary of the 18-20 September 2026 Russian legislative election in the Balashov constituency
Candidate	Party	Votes	%
Nikolay Pankov	United Russia	184,230	65.35%
Vladimir Yesipov	Communist Party	52,584	18.65%
Yaroslav Yevgeyuk	A Just Russia	15,545	5.51%
Sergey Lityak	Liberal Democratic Party	12,789	4.54%
Aleksandr Vantsov	Rodina	11,094	3.94%
Vsevolod Khatsenko	New People	3,846	1.36%
Kirill Rumyantsev	Yabloko	846	0.30%
Total		281,907	100%
