= Saratov constituency =

Russian legislative constituency

Saratov single-member constituency
- Constituency of the Russian State Duma

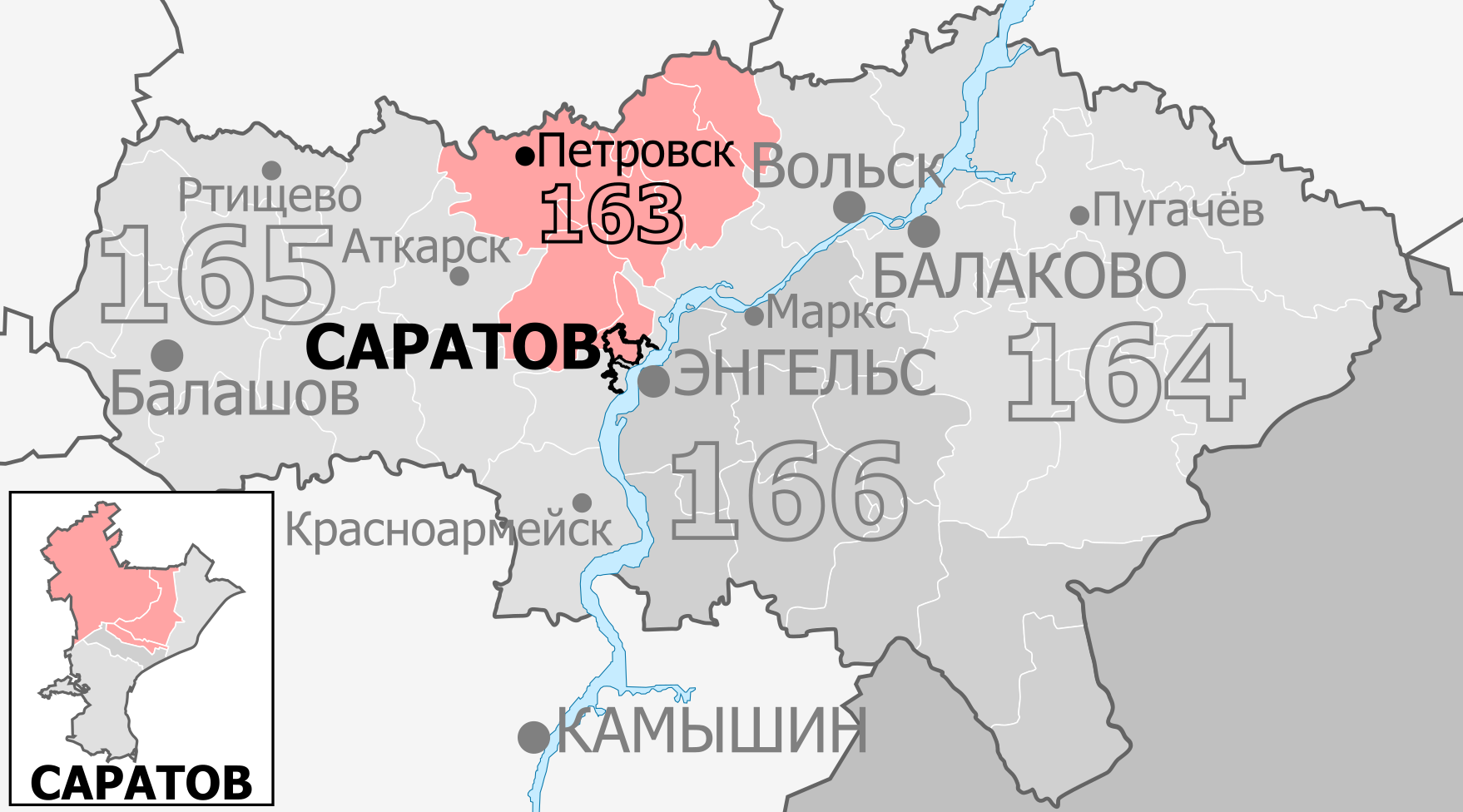
- Constituency boundaries since 2016
- Deputy: Vyacheslav Volodin; United Russia
- Federal subject: Saratov Oblast
- Districts: Bazarno-Karabulaksky, Baltaysky, Gagarinsky (Note: part of Saratov) (Atamanovka, Bartolomeyevsky, Doktorovka, Dubki, Ferma, Gotovitsky, Kamensky, Kleshchyovka, Kurdyum, Kurdyum Station, Ilyinovka, Malaya Skatovka, Novaya Lipovka, Polyakov, Raskovo, Raslovka 1st, Shevyryovka, Sokolovy, Storozhevka, Svintsovka, Trud, Zelyonkino, Zorinsky, Zorinsky Station), Novoburassky, Petrovsky, Saratov (Frunzensky, Kirovsky, Leninsky), Svetly, Tatishchevsky
- Voters: 473,070 (2026)

The Saratov constituency (No.164 (Note: No.157 in 1993–1995, No.158 in 1995–2007, No.163 in 2016–2026)) is a Russian legislative constituency in Saratov Oblast. The constituency covers northern and central Saratov, including the city centre, its western suburbs as well as rural north-central Saratov Oblast.

The constituency has been represented since 2021 by United Russia deputy Vyacheslav Volodin, Chairman of the State Duma since 2016 and six-term State Duma member, who won the open seat, succeeding three-term Communist incumbent Olga Alimova, who sought re-election in Engels constituency.

== Boundaries ==
1993–2007: Saratov (Frunzensky, Kirovsky, Leninsky, Zavodskoy)
The constituency covered most of Saratov, including central part of the city.

2016–present: Bazarno-Karabulaksky District, Baltaysky District, Gagarinsky District (Atamanovka, Bartolomeyevsky, Doktorovka, Dubki, Ferma, Gotovitsky, Kamensky, Kleshchyovka, Kurdyum, Kurdyum Station, Ilyinovka, Malaya Skatovka, Novaya Lipovka, Polyakov, Raskovo, Raslovka 1st, Shevyryovka, Sokolovy, Storozhevka, Svintsovka, Trud, Zelyonkino, Zorinsky, Zorinsky Station), Novoburassky District, Petrovsky District, Saratov (Frunzensky, Kirovsky, Leninsky), Svetly, Tatishchevsky District
The constituency was re-created for the 2016 election and retained most of its former territory, losing Zavodskoy City District to Balashov constituency. This seat instead took northern Saratov suburbs from Engels constituency as well as rural north-central Saratov Oblast from Balashov constituency.

== Members elected ==
Election	Member	Party
1993	Anatoly Gordeyev	Independent
1995	Boris Gromov	My Fatherland
1999	Valery Rashkin	Communist Party
2003	Vladislav Tretiak	Independent
2007	Proportional representation - no election by constituency	
2011	Proportional representation - no election by constituency	
2016	Oleg Grishchenko (Note: died in office in 2017)	United Russia
2018	Olga Alimova	Communist Party
2021	Vyacheslav Volodin	United Russia
2026	Vyacheslav Volodin	United Russia

== Election results ==
=== 1993 ===
Summary of the 12 December 1993 Russian legislative election in the Saratov constituency
Candidate	Party	Votes	%
Anatoly Gordeyev	Independent	47,664	17.95%
Yevgeny Motorny	Choice of Russia	38,162	12.37%
Mikhail Zaytsev	Independent	33,832	12.74%
Viktor Fedotov	Civic Union	26,426	9.95%
Aleksandr Nikitin	Yavlinsky–Boldyrev–Lukin	13,792	5.19%
Vladimir Kayl	Independent	11,373	4.28%
Pyotr Kamshilov	Independent	7,345	2.77%
Valentin Gubkin	Independent	6,168	2.32%
against all		57,418	21.63%
Total		265,487	100%

=== 1995 ===
Summary of the 17 December 1995 Russian legislative election in the Saratov constituency
Candidate	Party	Votes	%
Boris Gromov	My Fatherland	94,860	29.09%
Anatoly Gordeyev (incumbent)	Communist Party	86,524	26.54%
Mikhail Chugunov	Liberal Democratic Party	26,070	8.00%
Andrey Rossoshansky	Our Home – Russia	24,487	7.51%
Yevgeny Motorny	Forward, Russia!	24,075	7.38%
Aleksandr Miroshin	Independent	10,533	3.23%
Vladimir Vlaskin	Derzhava	10,128	3.11%
Valentina Fomina	Russian Lawyers' Association	7,945	2.44%
Dmitry Oleynik	Congress of Russian Communities	4,510	1.38%
Yury Usynin	Independent	2,417	0.74%
Lev Ilyukhin	Social Democrats	1,902	0.58%
Valery Sturov	Independent	1,514	0.46%
Dmitry Sorokin	Independent	1,171	0.36%
against all		22,818	7.00%
Total		326,049	100%

=== 1999 ===
Summary of the 19 December 1999 Russian legislative election in the Saratov constituency
Candidate	Party	Votes	%
Valery Rashkin	Communist Party	102,061	31.66%
Vyacheslav Maltsev	Fatherland – All Russia	47,652	14.78%
Arkady Yevstafyev	Independent	35,747	11.09%
Mikhail Yakovlev	Unity	23,965	7.43%
Vladimir Rodionov	Independent	21,829	6.77%
Yury Usynin	Our Home – Russia	17,786	5.52%
Nikolay Razin	Independent	6,497	2.02%
Valentin Lubnin	Andrei Nikolayev and Svyatoslav Fyodorov Bloc	5,645	1.75%
Oleg Proskurin	Independent	2,664	0.83%
Roman Torgashin	Peace, Labour, May	2,549	0.79%
Vyacheslav Mineyev	Independent	2,057	0.64%
Spartak Tonakyan	Independent	2,040	0.63%
Aleksandr Paradiz	Independent	1,118	0.35%
against all		44,323	13.75%
Total		322,332	100%

=== 2003 ===
Summary of the 7 December 2003 Russian legislative election in the Saratov constituency
Candidate	Party	Votes	%
Vladislav Tretiak	Independent	68,096	24.97%
Valery Rashkin (incumbent)	Communist Party	56,601	20.76%
Aleksey Poleshchikov	Independent	48,465	17.77%
Vyacheslav Maltsev	Independent	35,828	13.14%
Dmitry Udalov	Independent	11,482	4.21%
Oleg Kuznetsov	Russian Pensioners' Party-Party of Social Justice	5,779	2.12%
Vladimir Yuzhakov	Union of Right Forces	5,111	1.87%
Aleksey Chernyshov	Liberal Democratic Party	4,188	1.54%
Aleksandr Timoshok	Party of Russia's Rebirth-Russian Party of Life	1,760	0.65%
Svetlana Oleynik	Independent	1,501	0.55%
Lev Ilyukhin	Social Democratic Party	1,011	0.37%
Viktor Oshkin	Independent	830	0.30%
Anatoly Volkov	Independent	779	0.29%
Ruslan Miroshnichenko	Russian Party of Labour	620	0.23%
against all		26,640	9.55%
Total		272,701	100%

=== 2016 ===
Summary of the 18 September 2016 Russian legislative election in the Saratov constituency
Candidate	Party	Votes	%
Oleg Grishchenko	United Russia	171,851	53.08%
Aleksandr Anidalov	Communist Party	40,390	12.47%
Anton Ishchenko	Liberal Democratic Party	34,507	10.66%
Pavel Mironov	A Just Russia	24,328	7.51%
Viktor Safyanov	Communists of Russia	12,938	3.99%
Dmitry Khanenko	Party of Growth	12,161	3.76%
Dmitry Konnychev	Yabloko	11,847	3.66%
Aleksandr Frolov	Greens	6,346	1.96%
Aleksandr Ledkov	People's Freedom Party	4,171	1.29%

=== 2018 ===
Summary of the 9 September 2018 Russian by-election in the Saratov constituency
Candidate	Party	Votes	%
Olga Alimova	Communist Party	35,400	45.35%
Dmitry Pyanykh	Liberal Democratic Party	12,499	16.01%
Svetlana Berezina	A Just Russia	10,101	12.94%
Aleksandr Kargopolov	Party of Pensioners	7,934	10.16%
Aleksandr Grishantsov	Communists of Russia	5,310	6.80%
Ksenia Sverdlova	Yabloko	4,110	5.27%

=== 2021 ===
Summary of the 17-19 September 2021 Russian legislative election in the Saratov constituency
Candidate	Party	Votes	%
Vyacheslav Volodin	United Russia	173,322	72.11%
Aleksandr Anidalov	Communist Party	38,534	16.03%
Dmitry Pyanykh	Liberal Democratic Party	5,987	2.49%
Aleksey Yemelyanov	A Just Russia — For Truth	5,478	2.28%
Aleksandr Grishantsov	Communists of Russia	4,260	1.77%
Yevgeny Savinov	New People	3,498	1.46%
Aleksey Linev	Party of Pensioners	2,848	1.18%
Dmitry Konnychev	Yabloko	1,977	0.82%
Sergey Arzamastsev	Rodina	1,569	0.65%
Total		240,362	100%

=== 2026 ===
Summary of the 18-20 September 2026 Russian legislative election in the Saratov constituency
Candidate	Party	Votes	%
Vyacheslav Volodin (incumbent)	United Russia	241,615	82.84%
Denis Bulanov	Communist Party	30,243	10.37%
Nikita Grigoryevsky	Liberal Democratic Party	8,597	2.95%
Angelina Revina	A Just Russia	5,167	1.77%
Dilrabo Normanova	New People	2,504	0.86%
Sergey Lyubtsov	Yabloko	1,286	0.44%
Andrey Kornev	Rodina	1,211	0.42%
Total		291,654	100%
