= Balakovo constituency =

Russian legislative constituency

Balakovo single-member constituency
- Constituency of the Russian State Duma

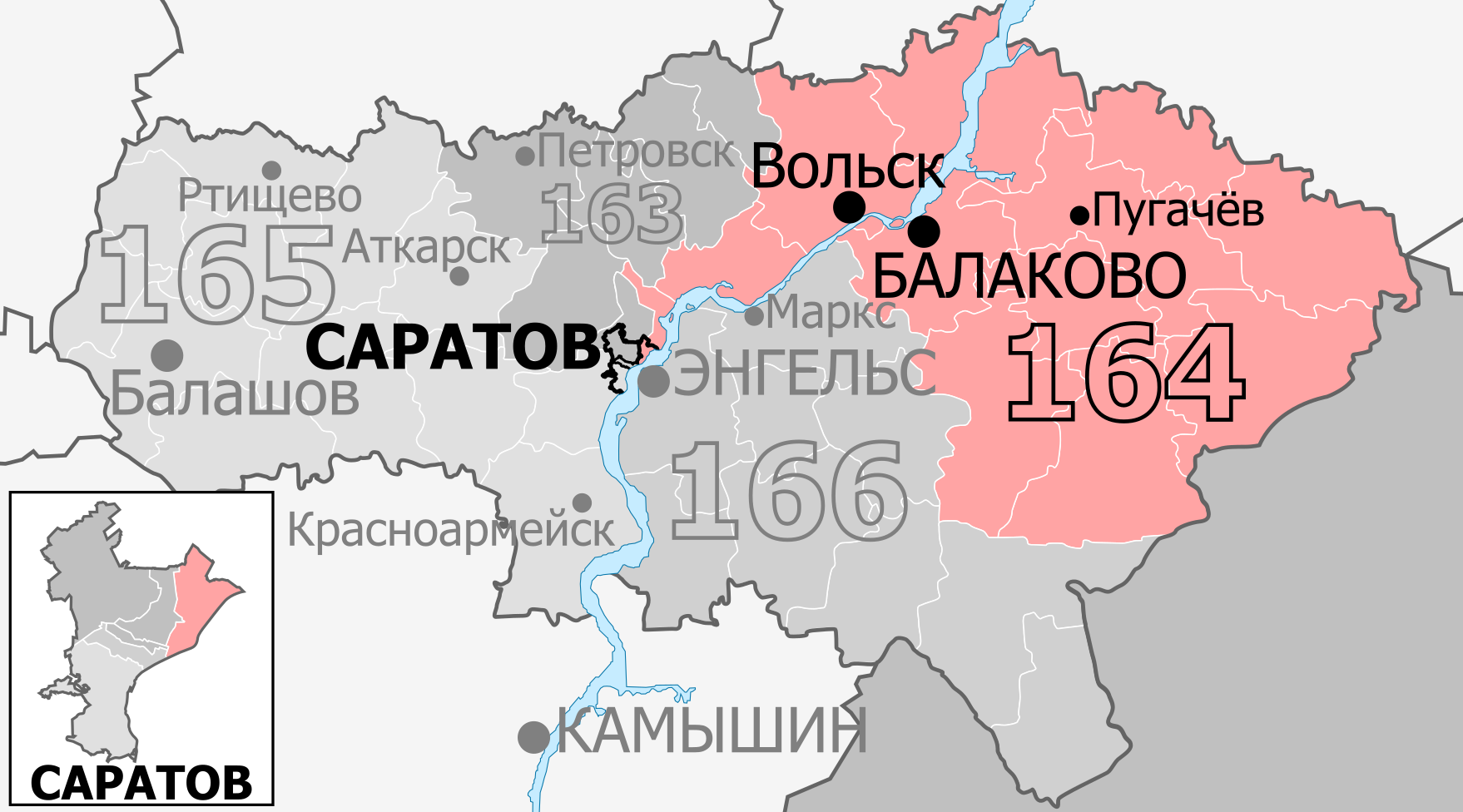
- Constituency boundaries since 2016
- Deputy: Antonina Galyashkina; United Russia
- Federal subject: Saratov Oblast
- Districts: Saratov (Volzhsky), ZATO Mikhaylovsky, ZATO Shikhany, Balakosvky, Dergachyovsky, Dukhovnitsky, Gagarinsky (Note: part of Saratov) (Bokovka, Dolgy Buyerak, Kozlovka, Mergichyovka, Novoguselsky, Pristannoye, Raslovka, Saburovka, Shevyryovka, Tarkhany, Ust-Kurdyum, Volnovka, Vyazovka), Ivanteyevsky, Khvalynsky, Krasnopartizansky, Ozinsky, Perelyubsky, Pugachyovsky, Volsky, Voskresensky, Yershovsky
- Voters: 463,344 (2026)

The Balakovo constituency (No.165 (Note: No.155 in 1993-1995, No.156 in 1995-2007, No.164 in 2016–2026)) is a Russian legislative constituency in Saratov Oblast. The constituency stretches from eastern Saratov and its suburbs to largely rural eastern Saratov Oblast, including the cities Balakovo, Pugachyov and Volsk.

The constituency has been represented since 2026 by United Russia deputy Antonina Galyashkina, former Member of Saratov Oblast Duma and Head of Ozinsky District, who won the open seat after four-term United Russia incumbent Nikolay Pankov successfully sought re-election in the Balashov constituency.

== Boundaries ==
1993–1995: Alexandrovo-Gaysky District, Balakovsky District, Dergachyovsky District, Dukhovnitsky District, Ivanteyevsky District, Khvalynsky District, Krasnopartizansky District, Novouzensky District, Ozinsky District, Perelyubsky District, Pitersky District, Pugachyovsky District, Shikhany, Volsky District, Voskresensky District, Yershovsky District
The constituency covered the entirety of western Saratov Oblast, including industrial city of Balakovo, where Balakovo Nuclear Power Plant and Saratov Hydroelectric Station are situated, as well as agroindustrial towns Khvalynsk, Pugachyov and Volsk.

2016–present: Balakovsky District, Dergachyovsky District, Dukhovnitsky District, Gagarinsky District (Bokovka, Dolgy Buyerak, Kozlovka, Mergichyovka, Novoguselsky, Pristannoye, Raslovka, Saburovka, Shevyryovka, Tarkhany, Ust-Kurdyum, Volnovka, Vyazovka), Ivanteyevsky District, Khvalynsky District, Krasnopartizansky District, Mikhaylovsky, Ozinsky District, Perelyubsky District, Pugachyovsky District, Saratov (Volzhsky), Shikhany, Volsky District, Voskresensky District, Yershovsky District
The constituency was re-created for the 2016 election and retained most of its territory, losing south-eastern corner of Saratov Oblast to Engels constituency. This seat instead was pushed to gained eastern Saratov and its suburbs from the former Engels constituency.

== Members elected ==
Election	Member	Party
1993	Aleksandr Sergeyenkov	Independent
1995	Aleksandr Maksakov (Note: died in November 1997)	Communist Party
1998	Nikolay Sukhoy	Independent
1999	Nikolay Sukhoy	Fatherland – All Russia
2003	Vyacheslav Volodin	United Russia
2007	Proportional representation - no election by constituency	
2011	Proportional representation - no election by constituency	
2016	Nikolay Pankov	United Russia
2021	Nikolay Pankov	United Russia
2026	Antonina Galyashkina	United Russia

== Election results ==
=== 1993 ===
Summary of the 12 December 1993 Russian legislative election in the Balakovo constituency
Candidate	Party	Votes	%
Aleksandr Sergeyenkov	Independent	56,285	18.09%
Aleksey Ulyankin	Independent	56,129	18.04%
Aleksandr Bogdanov	Independent	50,583	16.25%
Yelena Sergun	Yavlinsky–Boldyrev–Lukin	39,594	12.72%
Vladimir Uglev	Independent	25,523	8.20%
against all		56,150	18.04%
Total		311,219	100%

=== 1995 ===
Summary of the 17 December 1995 Russian legislative election in the Balakovo constituency
Candidate	Party	Votes	%
Aleksandr Maksakov	Communist Party	97,030	25.79%
Dmitry Matveyev	Liberal Democratic Party	80,869	21.49%
Viktor Anpilov	Communists and Working Russia - for the Soviet Union	38,864	10.33%
Aleksandr Tsaryov	Agrarian Party	32,182	8.55%
Igor Nikiforov	Our Home – Russia	19,178	5.10%
Igor Yevtushevsky	Forward, Russia!	18,311	4.87%
Aleksandr Sergyeenkov (incumbent)	Independent	16,707	4.44%
Vladimir Solovyov	Independent	12,658	3.36%
Pyotr Novikov	Independent	10,934	2.91%
Aleksandr Kiselyov	Social Democrats	10,282	2.73%
Yury Sulantyev	Independent	5,701	1.52%
against all		28,746	7.64%
Total		376,232	100%

=== 1998 ===
Summary of the 29 March 1998 Russian by-election in the Balakovo single-member constituency
Candidate	Party	Votes	%
Nikolay Sukhoy	Independent	171,696	70.48%
Sergey Fedyushin	Independent	19,201	7.88%
Vladimir Kuzmin	Independent	10,133	4.15%
Viktor Zachetnov	Independent	10,077	4.13%
against all		24,505	10.05%
Total		243,610	100%

=== 1999 ===
Summary of the 19 December 1999 Russian legislative election in the Balakovo constituency
Candidate	Party	Votes	%
Nikolay Sukhoy (incumbent)	Fatherland – All Russia	144,352	38.99%
Gennady Gamayunov	Communist Party	78,061	21.09%
Anatoly Kalashnikov	Stalin Bloc – For the USSR	31,141	8.41%
Galina Startseva	Yabloko	24,663	6.66%
Sergey Semyonov	Independent	22,347	6.04%
Lyudmila Paderina	Communists and Workers of Russia - for the Soviet Union	16,068	4.34%
against all		47,586	12.85%
Total		370,193	100%

=== 2003 ===
Summary of the 7 December 2003 Russian legislative election in the Balakovo constituency
Candidate	Party	Votes	%
Vyacheslav Volodin	United Russia	283,613	81.75%
Olga Alimova	Communist Party	32,692	9.42%
Aleksandr Tagunov	Liberal Democratic Party	4,228	1.22%
Vladimir Smirnov	Union of Right Forces	4,013	1.16%
Ivan Bolshakov	Yabloko	2,575	0.74%
Yury Graf	Independent	1,015	0.29%
Natalya Karaman	Development of Enterprise	862	0.25%
Vyacheslav Smirnov	United Russian Party Rus'	683	0.20%
Yevgeny Chirkov	Independent	483	0.14%
against all		13,401	3.86%
Total		347,112	100%

=== 2016 ===
Summary of the 18 September 2016 Russian legislative election in the Balakovo constituency
Candidate	Party	Votes	%
Nikolay Pankov	United Russia	187,489	65.79%
Sergey Ashikhmin	Liberal Democratic Party	24,488	8.59%
Olga Lubkova	Communist Party	22,446	7.88%
Mikhail Dementyev	A Just Russia	11,870	4.17%
Aleksandr German	Communists of Russia	9,318	3.27%
Vladimir Deryabin	Party of Growth	6,020	2.11%
Aleksandr Yermishin	Yabloko	4,292	1.51%
Roman Maltsev	People's Freedom Party	3,755	1.32%
Natalia Frolova	Civilian Power	3,018	1.06%
Gleb Terekhin	Rodina	2,491	0.87%
Alisa Trishchanovich	The Greens	2,052	0.72%
Maksim Smirnov	Civic Platform	1,559	0.55%
Total		284,987	100%

=== 2021 ===
Summary of the 17-19 September 2021 Russian legislative election in the Balakovo constituency
Candidate	Party	Votes	%
Nikolay Pankov (incumbent)	United Russia	182,223	63.07%
Vladimir Yesipov	Communist Party	38,794	13.43%
Svetlana Berezina	A Just Russia — For Truth	18,094	6.26%
Aleksandra Gryakova	Communists of Russia	14,404	4.99%
Andrey Zobnin	New People	10,115	3.50%
Natalya Karaman	Yabloko	7,140	2.47%
Maksim Ramich	Liberal Democratic Party	6,772	2.34%
Aleksandr Urmanbayev	Rodina	2,783	0.96%
Total		288,933	100%

=== 2026 ===
Summary of the 18-20 September 2026 Russian legislative election in the Balakovo constituency
Candidate	Party	Votes	%
Antonina Galyashkina	United Russia	180,712	57.51%
Aleksandr Anidalov	Communist Party	66,646	21.21%
Maksim Ramich	Liberal Democratic Party	25,505	8.12%
Olga Bondareva	A Just Russia	24,899	7.92%
Aleksandr Grishantsov	Communists of Russia	6,581	2.09%
Sergey Demin	Rodina	3,541	1.13%
Ilya Kuznetsov	New People	3,449	1.10%
Aleksandr Gayevoy	Yabloko	1,755	0.56%
Total		314,222	100%
