= Tatishchevo =

Tatischevo may refer to:

- Tatishchevo (inhabited locality), several inhabited localities in Russia
- Tatishchevo (airbase), a military airbase in Saratov Oblast, Russia
