= Dukhovnitsky =

Dukhovnitsky (masculine), Dukhovnitskaya (feminine), or Dukhovnitskoye (neuter) may refer to:

- Dukhovnitsky District, a district of Saratov Oblast, Russia
- Dukhovnitskoye, an urban locality (a work settlement) in Dukhovnitsky District of Saratov Oblast, Russia
