= Roslyakovo =

Roslyakovo (Russian: Росляково) is the name of several rural localities in Russia:

- Roslyakovo, Saratov Oblast, a village in Dukhovnitsky District of Saratov Oblast
- Roslyakovo, Vologda Oblast, a village in Glushkovsky Selsoviet of Belozersky District in Vologda Oblast
- Roslyakovo, Yaroslavl Oblast, a village in Lyutovsky Rural Okrug of Yaroslavsky District in Yaroslavl Oblast
- Roslyakovo, Murmansk Oblast, a former urban-type settlement under the administrative jurisdiction of the closed administrative-territorial formation of Severomorsk in Murmansk Oblast; merged into the city of Murmansk in January 2015
