= Tatishchevo (inhabited locality) =

Tatishchevo (Russian: Татищево) is the name of several inhabited localities in Russia.

Urban localities

- Tatishchevo, Saratov Oblast, a work settlement in Tatishchevsky District of Saratov Oblast

Rural localities

- Tatishchevo, Bryansk Oblast, a village in Baklansky Selsoviet of Pochepsky District of Bryansk Oblast
- Tatishchevo, Chelyabinsk Oblast, a selo in Velikopetrovsky Selsoviet of Kartalinsky District of Chelyabinsk Oblast
- Tatishchevo, Ivanovo Oblast, a village in Privolzhsky District of Ivanovo Oblast
- Tatishchevo, Lipetsk Oblast, a village in Petelinsky Selsoviet of Chaplyginsky District of Lipetsk Oblast
- Tatishchevo, Kulikovskoye Rural Settlement, Dmitrovsky District, Moscow Oblast, a settlement in Kulikovskoye Rural Settlement of Dmitrovsky District of Moscow Oblast
- Tatishchevo, Dmitrov, Dmitrovsky District, Moscow Oblast, a village under the administrative jurisdiction of the Town of Dmitrov in Dmitrovsky District of Moscow Oblast
- Tatishchevo, Istrinsky District, Moscow Oblast, a village in Kostrovskoye Rural Settlement of Istrinsky District of Moscow Oblast
- Tatishchevo, Naro-Fominsky District, Moscow Oblast, a village in Volchenkovskoye Rural Settlement of Naro-Fominsky District of Moscow Oblast
- Tatishchevo, Solnechnogorsky District, Moscow Oblast, a village in Krivtsovskoye Rural Settlement of Solnechnogorsky District of Moscow Oblast
- Tatishchevo, Volokolamsky District, Moscow Oblast, a village in Chismenskoye Rural Settlement of Volokolamsky District of Moscow Oblast
- Tatishchevo, Orenburg Oblast, a selo in Tatishchevsky Selsoviet of Perevolotsky District of Orenburg Oblast
- Tatishchevo, Pskov Oblast, a village in Ostrovsky District of Pskov Oblast
- Tatishchevo, Tula Oblast, a village in Dorobinsky Rural Okrug of Tyoplo-Ogaryovsky District of Tula Oblast
- Tatishchevo, Kimrsky District, Tver Oblast, a village in Goritskoye Rural Settlement of Kimrsky District of Tver Oblast
- Tatishchevo, Oleninsky District, Tver Oblast, a village in Kholmetskoye Rural Settlement of Oleninsky District of Tver Oblast
