= Dergachi =

Dergachi may refer to:

- Derhachi, a town in Kharkiv Oblast, Ukraine
- Dergachi, Russia, name of several inhabited localities in Russia
