= Dergachi, Russia =

Dergachi (Russian: Дергачи) is the name of several inhabited localities in Russia.

Urban localities

- Dergachi, Saratov Oblast, a work settlement in Dergachyovsky District of Saratov Oblast

Rural localities

- Dergachi, Kirov Oblast, a village in Russko-Tureksky Rural Okrug of Urzhumsky District of Kirov Oblast
- Dergachi, Samara Oblast, a selo in Krasnoarmeysky District of Samara Oblast
- Dergachi, Tver Oblast, a village in Ploskoshskoye Rural Settlement of Toropetsky District of Tver Oblast
