= Turkovsky =

Turkovsky (masculine), Turkovskaya (feminine), or Turkovskoye (neuter) may refer to:

- Turkovsky District, a district of Saratov Oblast, Russia
- Turkovsky (rural locality), a rural locality (a khutor) in Krasnodar Krai, Russia
