= Andrey Vorobiev =

Russian politician

- Андрей Воробьёв
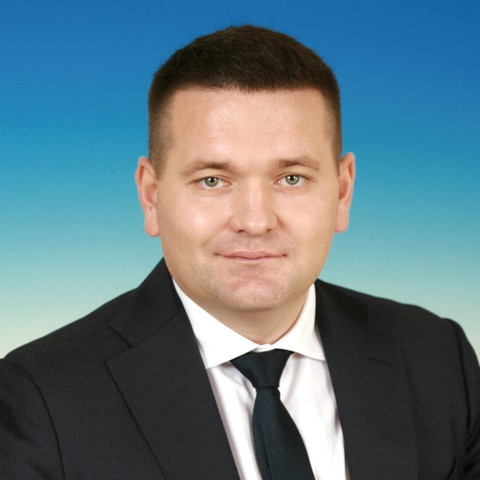
- official portrait, circa 2021

Deputy of the State Duma for
- Incumbent
- Assumed office 12 October 2021
- Preceded by: Yevgeny Primakov Jr.
- Constituency: Balashov (No. 165)

Personal details
- Born: 24 July 1985 (age 41) Engels, Saratov Oblast, Russian SFSR, Soviet Union
- Party: United Russia
- Education: Russian University of Cooperation

Andrey Victorovich Vorobiev (Russian: Андрей Викторович Воробьёв; born 24 July 1985, in Loshchinnyy, Engelssky District) is a Russian political figure and a deputy of the 8th State Duma.

From 2008 to 2017, he worked as the commercial director of several enterprises, such as Middle Volga Investment Group LLC, Agroalliance LLC, Middle Volga Service Company-Engineering LLC. In 2013, he was elected deputy of the Engels City Council of Deputies of Engels. In 2016, he was elected for the Assembly of Deputies of Engels. From 2017 to 2021, he was the deputy of the Saratov Oblast Duma of the 4th convocation. Since September 2021, he has served as deputy of the 8th State Duma.

== Sanctions ==
He was sanctioned by the UK government in 2022 in relation to the Russo-Ukrainian War.
