= Turki (urban-type settlement) =

Turki Турки
- Urban-type settlement
- Interactive map of Turki
- Location of Turki Turki (Saratov Oblast)
- Coordinates: 51.9818°N 43.2712°E
- Country: Russia
- Federal subject: Saratov Oblast
- Administrative district: Turkovsky District
- Founded: 1723

Population (2010 Census)
  - Total: 6,122
  - Estimate (2021): 5,272 (−13.9%)
- Time zone: UTC+4 (MSK+1)
- Postal code: 412070
- OKTMO ID: 63647151051

Turki (Russian: Турки́) is an urban locality (an urban-type settlement) in Turkovsky District of Saratov Oblast, Russia. Population: 6,122 (2010 census); 6,872 (2002 census); 7,418 (1989 Soviet census).
