= Novye Burasy =

Novye Burasy Новые Бурасы
- Urban-type settlement
- Interactive map of Novye Burasy
- Location of Novye Burasy Novye Burasy (Saratov Oblast)
- Coordinates: 52.1296°N 46.0772°E
- Country: Russia
- Federal subject: Saratov Oblast
- Administrative district: Novoburassky District
- Founded: 1777

Population (2010 Census)
  - Total: 5,870
  - Estimate (2026): 5,590 (−4.8%)
- Time zone: UTC+4 (MSK+1)
- Postal code: 412580
- OKTMO ID: 63629151051

Novye Burasy (Russian: Но́вые Бура́сы) is an urban locality (an urban-type settlement) in Novoburassky District of Saratov Oblast, Russia. Population: 5,870 (2010 census); 6,517 (2002 census); 5,857 (1989 Soviet census).
