= Perelyub =

Rural locality in Saratov Oblast, Russia

Coordinates: 51°51′35″N 50°21′06″E

Perelyub (Russian: Перелюб) is a rural locality (a selo) and the administrative center of Perelyubsky District, Saratov Oblast, Russia. Population: 4,774 (2010 census); 5,591 (2002 census); 5,161 (1989 Soviet census).
