= Baltay =

Rural locality in Baltaysky District, Saratov Oblast, Russia

Coordinates: 52°28′N 46°38′E

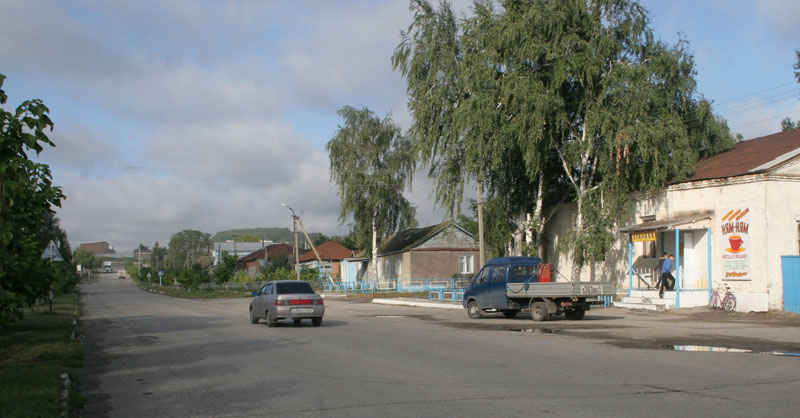
A street in Baltay

Baltay (Russian: Балта́й) is a rural locality and the administrative center of Baltaysky District of Saratov Oblast, Russia. Population: 3,873 (2010 census); 3,989 (2002 census); 3,275 (1989 Soviet census).
