= Vladislav Tretiak =

Russian ice hockey player (born 1952)

Vladislav Tretiak MP MSM
- Hockey Hall of Fame, 1989
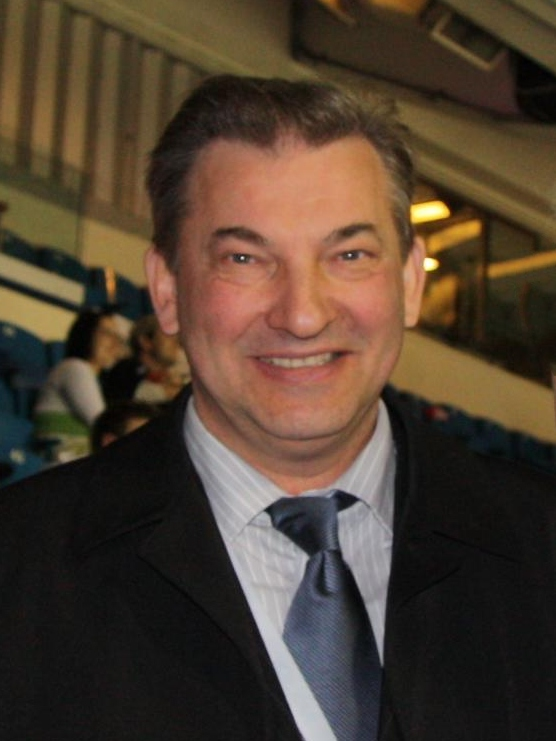
- Tretiak in 2008
- Born: 25 April 1952 (age 74) Orudyevo, Russian SFSR, Soviet Union
- Height: 6 ft 0 in (183 cm)
- Weight: 201 lb (91 kg; 14 st 5 lb)
- Position: Goaltender
- Caught: Left
- Played for: CSKA Moscow
- National team: Soviet Union
- NHL draft: 138th overall, 1983; Montreal Canadiens
- Playing career: 1968–1984
Medal record
Men's ice hockey
Representing Soviet Union
Olympic Games
Gold medal – first place	1972 Sapporo
Gold medal – first place	1976 Innsbruck
Gold medal – first place	1984 Sarajevo
Silver medal – second place	1980 Lake Placid
World Championships
Gold medal – first place	1970 Sweden
Gold medal – first place	1971 Switzerland
Gold medal – first place	1973 Soviet Union
Gold medal – first place	1974 Finland
Gold medal – first place	1975 West Germany
Gold medal – first place	1978 Czechoslovakia
Gold medal – first place	1979 Soviet Union
Gold medal – first place	1981 Sweden
Gold medal – first place	1982 Finland
Gold medal – first place	1983 West Germany
Silver medal – second place	1972 Czechoslovakia
Silver medal – second place	1976 Poland
Bronze medal – third place	1977 Austria
Canada Cup
Gold medal – first place	1981 Canada
European Junior Championships
Gold medal – first place	1969 West Germany
Gold medal – first place	1970 Switzerland
Gold medal – first place	1971 Czechoslovakia
Silver medal – second place	1968 Finland

Member of the State Duma for Ulyanovsk Oblast
- Incumbent
- Assumed office 5 October 2016
- Preceded by: constituency re-established
- Constituency: Radishchevo (No. 188)

Member of the State Duma (Party List Seat)
- In office 24 December 2007 – 5 October 2016

Member of the State Duma for Saratov Oblast
- In office 29 December 2003 – 24 December 2007
- Preceded by: Valery Rashkin
- Succeeded by: constituencies abolished
- Constituency: Saratov (No. 158)

Personal details
- Party: United Russia
- Spouse: Tatiana Tretiak (m. 1972)
- Children: 2
- Education: Smolensk State Institute of Physical Culture; Lenin Military-Political Academy

Vladislav Aleksandrovich Tretiak MP MSM (Russian: Владислав Александрович Третьяк, IPA: [trʲɪˈtʲjak]; born 25 April 1952) is a Russian former goaltender for the Soviet Union national ice hockey team. He was inducted into the inaugural class of the International Ice Hockey Federation (IIHF) Hall of Fame in 1997. Considered to be one of the greatest goaltenders in the history of the sport, he was voted one of six players to the IIHF Centennial All-Star Team in a poll conducted by a group of 56 experts from 16 countries. Tretiak is the current president of the Ice Hockey Federation of Russia and was the general manager of the Russian 2010 Winter Olympic team.

== Early years ==
Tretiak grew up in the USSR. His parents are from Dmitrovsky District. His father served 37 years as a military pilot, and his mother was a physical education teacher. Although he initially followed his brother as a swimmer, as a child Tretiak excelled at many sports, and is remembered for his ambition to master all of them. However, like many children of his generation, he loved hockey, and at age 11 entered the Children and Youth Sports School of the Central Sports Club of the Army (known by its abbreviation CSKA). His first trainer was Mike Jaure. He began playing goaltender when he saw that no one else had the desire or courage to play the position.

== International playing career ==
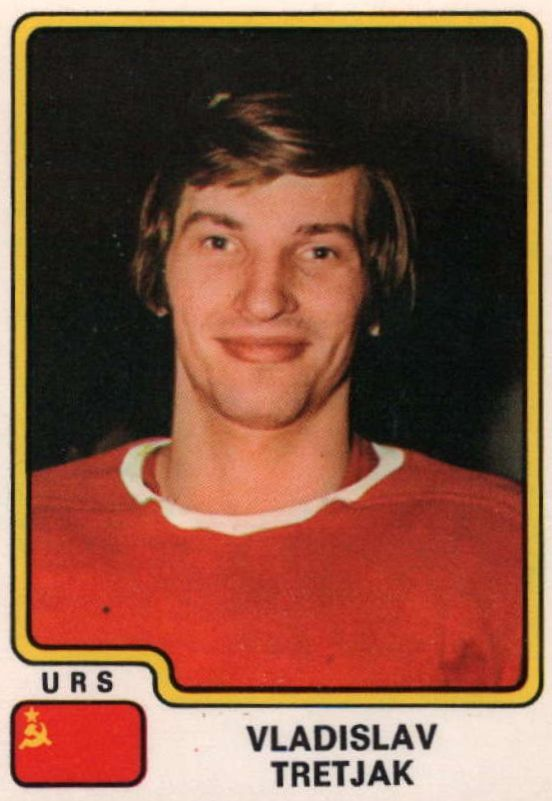
Tretiak on a 1979 card

Although Tretiak did not play his first hockey game until the age of eleven (1963), he was well known in the USSR by 1971 (aged 19), when he was named to the Soviet Ice Hockey League's First All-Star Team, while playing for the powerhouse Red Army team, CSKA Moscow. He also played well in the 1972 Winter Olympics, in which the Soviets took the gold medal.

Tretiak became internationally famous after his outstanding performance in the Summit Series in 1972, when he helped surprise the world, including the Canadian team, en route to a narrow loss to the Canadians. Canadian scouts seriously underestimated his goaltending ability prior to the series; they witnessed him let in eight goals on a particular night, not knowing that he had been married the previous evening. Tretiak played every game in the Series, while Canada used the goaltender tandem of Tony Esposito and Ken Dryden. Tretiak has since become good friends with one of the Canadian players, Dennis Hull who said "I told Tretiak that he's become famous for letting in [Henderson's] goal...I said to him that 'if you had stopped it, you'd probably be a cab driver in Moscow today.' "

During the 1976 Super Series, Tretiak put on a dominant performance against the Montreal Canadiens, holding them to a 3–3 tie despite his team being outshot 38–13.

Tretiak went on to star for the Soviet Union, helping them win gold medals in the 1976 Winter Olympics, and again in the 1984 Winter Olympics and the 1981 Canada Cup. Tretiak also back-stopped the Soviets to ten IIHF World Championships victories and nine in the IIHF European Championships.

In the 1980 Winter Olympics, the USSR team loss to team USA in a medal round game, where Tretiak was controversially pulled after letting in two goals in the first period. The Soviet team won silver, as they had the second-highest number of points in the tournament..

The Montreal Canadiens subsequently chose Tretiak in the 1983 NHL entry draft, but the Soviet government did not let him leave.

Though he was only 32 in 1984 and still capable of playing top-level hockey, Tretiak retired. It is said that he wanted to spend more time with his family and asked the national team coach Viktor Tikhonov for a training regime, in which he could live at home and come to the training camp before games. Since the rest of the team spent most of their time away from home in the training camp, Tikhonov refused. This move by Tikhonov contributed to Tretiak's decision to retire.

== Post-retirement ==
Tretiak retired in 1984, following a 2–0 victory over Czechoslovakia. He was awarded Order of the Red Banner of Labour (1984). In 1987 Tretiak wrote an autobiography, Tretiak, The Legend. He was named to the Hockey Hall of Fame in 1989, the first Soviet player to be honored.

In 1990, Mike Keenan hired Tretiak as a goaltender coach for the Chicago Blackhawks, which allowed him to coach goaltenders including Ed Belfour, Dominik Hašek, and Jocelyn Thibault. Under Tretiak's guidance, Belfour won two Vezina Trophies and two Jennings Trophies. Belfour and Hašek (serving as the backup in Chicago, who was later traded to the Buffalo Sabres and enjoyed his greatest success there) would eventually be named to the Hockey Hall of Fame. Keenan was so impressed with Tretiak's abilities in practice that he suggested the 38-year-old might still be able to play in the NHL. Tretiak said that coaching was the next best thing to playing in the NHL. After leaving the Blackhawks, Belfour wore uniform number 20 as a tribute to Tretiak. Numerous other goalies, including Evgeni Nabokov, also wore number 20 as a tribute to Tretiak.

In 2000, he was voted 'Best Russian Hockey Player' of the 20th century.

Tretiak was elected to the State Duma as a member of the United Russia party in December 2003, representing the Saratov constituency. He is chairman of the State Duma Committee on Physical Culture, Sport, and Youth.

He continued to work for the Chicago Blackhawks until the start of 2006–07 season. On 25 April 2006, his 54th birthday, Tretiak was elected head of the Russian Ice Hockey Federation. He obtained 93 out of the possible 96 votes, with the remaining three voters abstaining. A few days later, on 28 April, the Governor General of Canada, Michaëlle Jean, awarded Tretiak the Meritorious Service Medal in a ceremony at Rideau Hall. Tretiak earned the award for, among other things, his founding of the Friends of Canada organization to foster good relations between Canada and Russia. He was the first Russian to be conferred this honor.

He also ran a goalie school at the Canlan Ice Sports in Toronto, Ontario. Called the Vladislav Tretiak Elite School of Goaltending, it was considered one of the most physically punishing goaltending schools in the world, and students could be refused admittance if not in top physical condition. He also ran a goalie school in Montreal during the 1990s where he trained many famous NHL goaltenders including Jose Theodore and Martin Brodeur. Tretiak also ran a goalie hockey camp in Detroit Lakes, Minnesota in the early 2000s.

On 28 March 2007, Tretiak went to Ottawa to discuss with Canadian officials the possibilities of holding another Summit Series during the summer of 2007, which would be 35 years after the initial event. Russian Prime Minister Mikhail Fradkov had also discussed with Canadian prime minister Stephen Harper about the possibilities of holding another event. In the end, a series was held in September 2007 between the national junior teams of Canada and Russia.

On 21 December 2012, he voted in favor of the "Dima Yakovlev Law" in the State Duma. This legislation bars the adoption of Russian children by U.S. citizens. The legislation was the response to the Magnitsky bill, whose purpose was punishing Russian officials responsible for the death of Russian tax lawyer Sergei Magnitsky in a Moscow prison in 2009 and also to grant permanent normal trade relations status to Russia.

Tretiak was the final torchbearer in the 2014 Winter Olympics in Sochi, Russia and lit the Olympic Flame during the opening ceremony along with Irina Rodnina.

== Personal ==
Tretiak married his wife Tatiana (born 1950) on 23 August 1972, six weeks after they met. Their first son, Dmitri, was born the following year and their daughter, Irina, was born 3 years later. Tatiana is qualified as a Russian literature teacher, although she no longer works. Tretiak is a devout Russian Orthodox Christian.

Tretiak was sanctioned financially by the United Kingdom government in 2022, in relation to the Russo-Ukrainian War. Canada also implemented sanctions in 2024.

== Career statistics ==
=== Soviet League ===
Season	Team	League	GP	W	L	T	MIN	GA	SO	GAA
1968–69	CSKA Moscow	Soviet	3	—	—	—	—	2	—	0.67
1969–70	CSKA Moscow	Soviet	34	—	—	—	—	76	—	2.24
1970–71	CSKA Moscow	Soviet	40	—	—	—	—	82	—	2.03
1971–72	CSKA Moscow	Soviet	30	—	—	—	—	78	—	2.60
1972–73	CSKA Moscow	Soviet	30	—	—	—	—	80	—	2.67
1973–74	CSKA Moscow	Soviet	27	—	—	—	—	94	—	3.48
1974–75	CSKA Moscow	Soviet	35	—	—	—	—	104	—	2.97
1975–76	CSKA Moscow	Soviet	33	—	—	—	—	100	—	3.03
1976–77	CSKA Moscow	Soviet	35	—	—	—	—	98	—	2.80
1977–78	CSKA Moscow	Soviet	29	—	—	—	—	72	—	2.48
1978–79	CSKA Moscow	Soviet	40	—	—	—	—	111	—	2.78
1979–80	CSKA Moscow	Soviet	36	—	—	—	—	85	—	2.36
1980–81	CSKA Moscow	Soviet	18	—	—	—	—	32	—	1.78
1981–82	CSKA Moscow	Soviet	41	34	4	3	2295	65	6	1.70
1982–83	CSKA Moscow	Soviet	29	25	3	1	1641	40	6	1.46
1983–84	CSKA Moscow	Soviet	22	22	0	0	1267	40	4	1.89
Soviet totals			482	—	—	—	—	1158	—	2.31

=== International statistics ===
Year	Team	Event	GP	W	L	T	MIN	GA	SO	GAA
1968	Soviet Union	EJC	1	—	—	—	20	1	0	3.00
1969	Soviet Union	EJC	2	—	—	—	—	—	—	—
1970	Soviet Union	EJC	2	—	—	—	—	—	—	—
1970	Soviet Union	WC	6	—	—	—	215	4	—	1.12
1971	Soviet Union	EJC	3	—	—	—	180	5	—	1.67
1971	Soviet Union	WC	5	—	—	—	241	6	—	1.49
1972	Soviet Union	Oly	3	3	0	0	180	7	0	2.33
1972	Soviet Union	WC	8	—	—	—	430	15	—	2.09
1972	Soviet Union	SS	8	—	—	—	480	31	—	3.87
1973	Soviet Union	WC	7	—	—	—	420	14	—	2.00
1974	Soviet Union	WC	8	—	—	—	440	12	—	1.64
1974	Soviet Union	SS	7	—	—	—	420	25	—	3.57
1975	Soviet Union	WC	8	—	—	—	449	18	—	2.41
1976	Soviet Union	Oly	5	5	0	0	300	11	0	2.20
1976	Soviet Union	WC	10	—	—	—	577	19	—	1.98
1976	Soviet Union	CC	5	—	—	—	300	14	—	2.80
1977	Soviet Union	WC	9	—	—	—	482	17	—	2.12
1978	Soviet Union	WC	8	—	—	—	480	21	—	2.63
1979	Soviet Union	WC	7	—	—	—	407	12	—	1.77
1980	Soviet Union	Oly	4	3	0	0	160	8	0	3.00
1981	Soviet Union	WC	7	—	—	—	420	13	—	1.86
1981	Soviet Union	CC	6	—	—	—	360	8	—	1.33
1982	Soviet Union	WC	8	—	—	—	464	19	—	2.46
1983	Soviet Union	WC	7	—	—	—	420	4	—	0.57
1984	Soviet Union	Oly	6	6	0	0	360	4	2	0.67
Oly totals			18	17	0	0	1000	30	2	1.80
WC totals			98	—	—	—	5445	174	—	1.92

Olympic stats from Olympedia

=== Super Series statistics ===
The Super Series were exhibition games between an NHL team and Soviet teams (usually a club from the Soviet Championship League). Tretiak competed in three such series.

Year	Team	Event	GP	W	L	T	MIN	GA	GAA	SO
1975–76	CSKA Moscow	Super-S	4	2	1	1	240	12	3.00	0
1980	CSKA Moscow	Super-S	5	3	2	0	300	18	3.60	0
1983	Soviet Union	Super-S	4			0	240	4	1.00

== Records and honours ==
- First All-Star in the Soviet League consecutively each year from 1971 until 1984. In those fourteen years, Tretiak won thirteen league titles with CSKA Moscow, and was named MVP of the league five times
- In 1978, Tretiak was awarded the Order of Lenin
- First player born and trained outside North America to be inducted into the Hockey Hall of Fame
- Inducted into the inaugural class of the IIHF Hall of Fame in 1997
- Order For Merit to the Fatherland 3rd (2012) and 4th (2002) class (Russian Federation)
- Order of Honour (Russian Federation)
- Order of the Red Banner of Labour (USSR)
- Order of Friendship of Peoples (USSR)
- Order of the Badge of Honour (USSR)
- Medal "For Labour Valour" (USSR)
- Jubilee Medal "60 Years of the Armed Forces of the USSR" (USSR)
- In the 2014 Winter Olympics in Sochi, Russia, he was given the honor of being the lighter of the Olympic Cauldron along with Irina Rodnina.
- Meritorious Service Medal (Canada)

== Support for other sports ==
Tretiak has supported the bid for bandy to be recognized as an Olympic sport.

Awards and achievements
Preceded by Valeri Kharlamov	Soviet MVP; 1974, 1975, 1976	Succeeded by Helmut Balderis
Preceded by Sergei Makarov	Soviet MVP; 1981	Succeeded by Viacheslav Fetisov
Preceded by Viacheslav Fetisov	Soviet MVP; 1983	Succeeded by Nikolai Drozdetsky
Olympic Games
Preceded by Callum Airlie, Jordan Duckitt, Desiree Henry, Katie Kirk, Cameron MacRitchie, Aidan Reynolds, and Adelle Tracey	Final Olympic torchbearer Sochi 2014; With: Irina Rodnina	Succeeded by Vanderlei Cordeiro de Lima
Preceded by Catriona Le May Doan, Steve Nash, Nancy Greene and Wayne Gretzky	Final Winter Olympic torchbearer Sochi 2014; With: Irina Rodnina	Succeeded by Yuna Kim
