= Yevgeny Primakov Jr. =

Russian journalist, TV host, politician and diplomat (born 1976)

- Евгений Примаков-младший
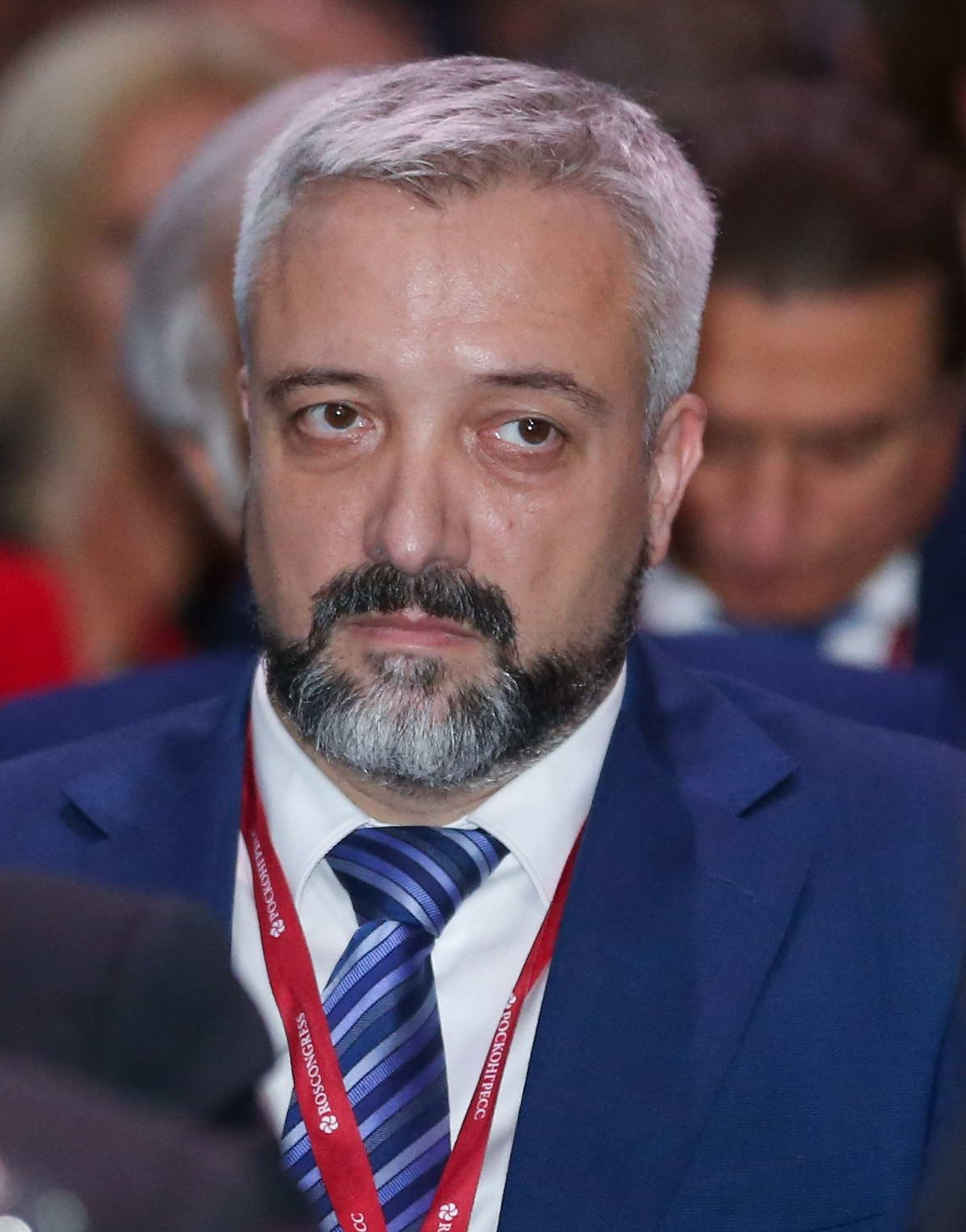
- Primakov in 2019

Head of the Rossotrudnichestvo
- Incumbent
- Assumed office 25 June 2020
- President: Vladimir Putin
- Preceded by: Eleonora Mitrofanova

Member of the State Duma for Saratov Oblast
- In office 25 September 2018 – 8 July 2020
- Preceded by: Mikhail Isayev
- Succeeded by: Andrey Vorobiev
- Constituency: Balashov (No. 165)

Personal details
- Born: 29 April 1976 (age 50) Moscow, RSFSR, USSR
- Party: United Russia
- Relatives: Yevgeny Primakov Sr. (grandfather)
- Education: Russian State University for the Humanities
- Occupation: Journalist, politician

Yevgeny Alexandrovich Primakov (Russian: Евгений Александрович Примаков), known as Yevgeny Primakov Jr. (Russian: Евгений Примаков-младший, born 29 April 1976) is a Russian journalist, TV host, politician and diplomat serving as Head of the Federal Agency for the Commonwealth of Independent States, Compatriots Living Abroad and International Humanitarian Cooperation since 25 June 2020. He previously was the Member of the State Duma from 2018 to 2020. In the media, he is known by the pseudonym Yevgeny Sandro.

He is a grandson of Yevgeny Primakov, former Russian Foreign Minister and Prime Minister.

== Early life ==
Yevgeny Primakov Jr. was born on 29 April 1976, in Moscow in the family of Alexander Primakov, who was a son of Yevgeny Primakov, a Soviet and Russian spy and politician. When he was five years old, his father died.

In 1999, he graduated from the history and Philology Department of the Russian State University for the Humanities with a degree in history.

== Career ==
=== Journalistic career (2000–2017) ===
For some time, Primakov worked in radio Echo of Moscow, in TASS, in the magazine Kommersant-Money, published in the Obshchaya Gazeta newspaper.

He has worked in television since 2002. Initially, he worked on the TVS channel as a military correspondent of the "News" and "Results" programs. He was among the journalists of the TV channel covering the Iraq War and worked as a correspondent in Israel and Iraq.

In May 2003, he left TVS and started working for NTV. He made stories for the programs "Today", "Country and the World" and "Profession is Reporter". From 2003 to 2005, he worked most often in Moscow, rarely–special forces in the Middle East. He covered the terrorist attack at the "Wings" rock festival in July 2003. While working at NTV as a correspondent he worked on business trips in Israel, Palestine, Afghanistan, Pakistan, Libya and Iraq. During his missions to Israel and Palestine, he covered the terrorist acts of Palestinian extremist organizations in Israeli cities.

From 2005 to 2007 he was the Chief of the Middle East Bureau of NTV. In his reports, he covered the 2006 Lebanon War in the war zone and in Israel. Also during the work on NTV he covered the events in the Gaza Strip (Gaza–Israel conflict) and on the West Bank. Repeatedly worked in a combat zone. For the organization of the evacuation of Russian citizens from the Gaza strip in the summer of 2007 during the coup carried out by Hamas, he was awarded the medal of the EMERCOM and UNHCR "Member of the Emergency Humanitarian Operation". He resigned from NTV in June 2007.

From autumn 2007 to October 2011, he was a correspondent of the Directorate of information programs of Channel One Russia (TV programs: "News", "Time", and "Other News"). From April 2008 to January 2011, he was the head of the Channel One bureau in Israel. In particular, as an employee of the TV company he worked on business trips in Libya during the Battle of Tripoli in the summer of 2011.

From 2011 to 2014 he worked in the office of the United Nations High Commissioner for Refugees in Turkey and Jordan.

From March 2015, he was the author and host of the program "International Review" on TV channel Russia 24.

=== Political career (2017–2020) ===
On March 20, 2017, Primakov was approved as a member of the Civic Chamber from 2017 to 2020 by the presidential quota.

In May 2017, he became an adviser to the Chairman of the State Duma Vyacheslav Volodin on international issues and humanitarian projects.

In 2018, he was a trustee of the Russian presidential candidate Vladimir Putin.

==== State Duma (2018–2020) ====
In April 2018, Primakov announced his participation in the United Russia primary election for the State Duma by-election in the Balashov constituency. Primakov won the primary on June 4, gaining 72.3% of the vote. He was elected to the State Duma on 9 September 2018 on a Single Electoral Day. He was a member of the State Duma Committee on International Affairs.

On 25 June 2020, he resigned due to being appointed in a diplomatic position.

=== Diplomatic career (2020–present) ===
On 25 June 2020, he was appointed as head of the Federal Agency for the Commonwealth of Independent States, Compatriots Living Abroad and International Humanitarian Cooperation (Rossotrudnichestvo).

On 20 May 2021, he accepted the offer to lead the Program committee of the international youth Forum Russia — Africa : whats next? on MGIMO base.

In April 2022, the Moscow Times reported that Primakov had stated that the Z and V military symbols as used by the Russian military during the 2022 Russian invasion of Ukraine were "symbols of the very liberation of Ukraine from the obvious evil of terrorists and bandits".

On 25 February 2023, the European Union imposed sanctions against Primakov as head of the Federal Agency for the Commonwealth of Independent States, Compatriots Living Abroad and International Humanitarian Cooperation (Rossotrudnichestvo), which seeks to consolidating public perception of the occupied Ukrainian territories as Russian, and for manifesting support for Russia's war of aggression against Ukraine.

On 12 February 2025, Russian President Vladimir Putin awarded the Order of Honor to Yevgeny Primakov.

== Personal life ==
Primakov is married and has four children.
