= Alexander Strelyukhin =

Russian politician

- Александр Стрелюхин
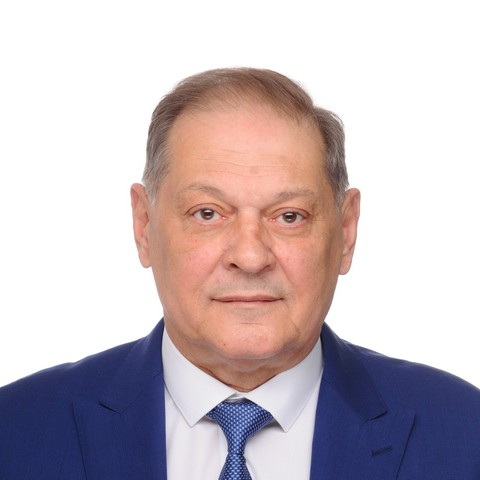

Member of the State Duma for Saratov Oblast
- Incumbent
- Assumed office 12 October 2021
- Preceded by: Vasily Maksimov
- Constituency: Engels (No. 166)

Head of the Engelssky District
- In office 2017–2021

Personal details
- Born: 4 July 1958 (age 68) Engels, Saratov Oblast, Russian SFSR, USSR
- Party: United Russia
- Education: Yuri Gagarin State Technical University of Saratov

Alexander Mikhailovich Strelyukhin (Russian: Александр Михайлович Стрелюхин; 4 July 1958, Engels, Saratov Oblast) is a Russian political figure, deputy of the 8th State Duma.

In 1980, Strelyukhin started working as an engineer of the glass-making department of the All-Union Scientific Research Institute of Technical and Special Construction Glass. From 1981 to 1998, he held various positions as foreman, chief engineer at various local industrial enterprises. In 1998, he was appointed the First Deputy Minister of Housing and Communal Services of the Saratov Oblast. From 2001 to 2005, he was the Deputy head of the Engels municipality for industry, energy, transport and communications. In 2006–2007, Strelyukhin was the acting Head of the Marks municipality. In 2017, he was elected Head of the Engelssky District. Since September 2021, he has served as deputy of the 8th State Duma.
