= Dergachi, Saratov Oblast =

Dergachi Дергачи
- Urban-type settlement
- Interactive map of Dergachi
- Location of Dergachi Dergachi (Saratov Oblast)
- Coordinates: 51.2353°N 48.7695°E
- Country: Russia
- Federal subject: Saratov Oblast
- Administrative district: Dergachyovsky District

Population (2010 Census)
  - Total: 8,276
  - Estimate (2021): 7,406 (−10.5%)
- Time zone: UTC+4 (MSK+1)
- Postal code: 413440–413443
- OKTMO ID: 63613151051

Dergachi (Russian: Дергачи) is an urban locality (an urban-type settlement) in Dergachyovsky District of Saratov Oblast, Russia. Population: 8,276 (2010 census); 9,642 (2002 census); 10,343 (1989 Soviet census).
