= Sokolovy =

Sokolovy Соколовый
- Urban-type settlement
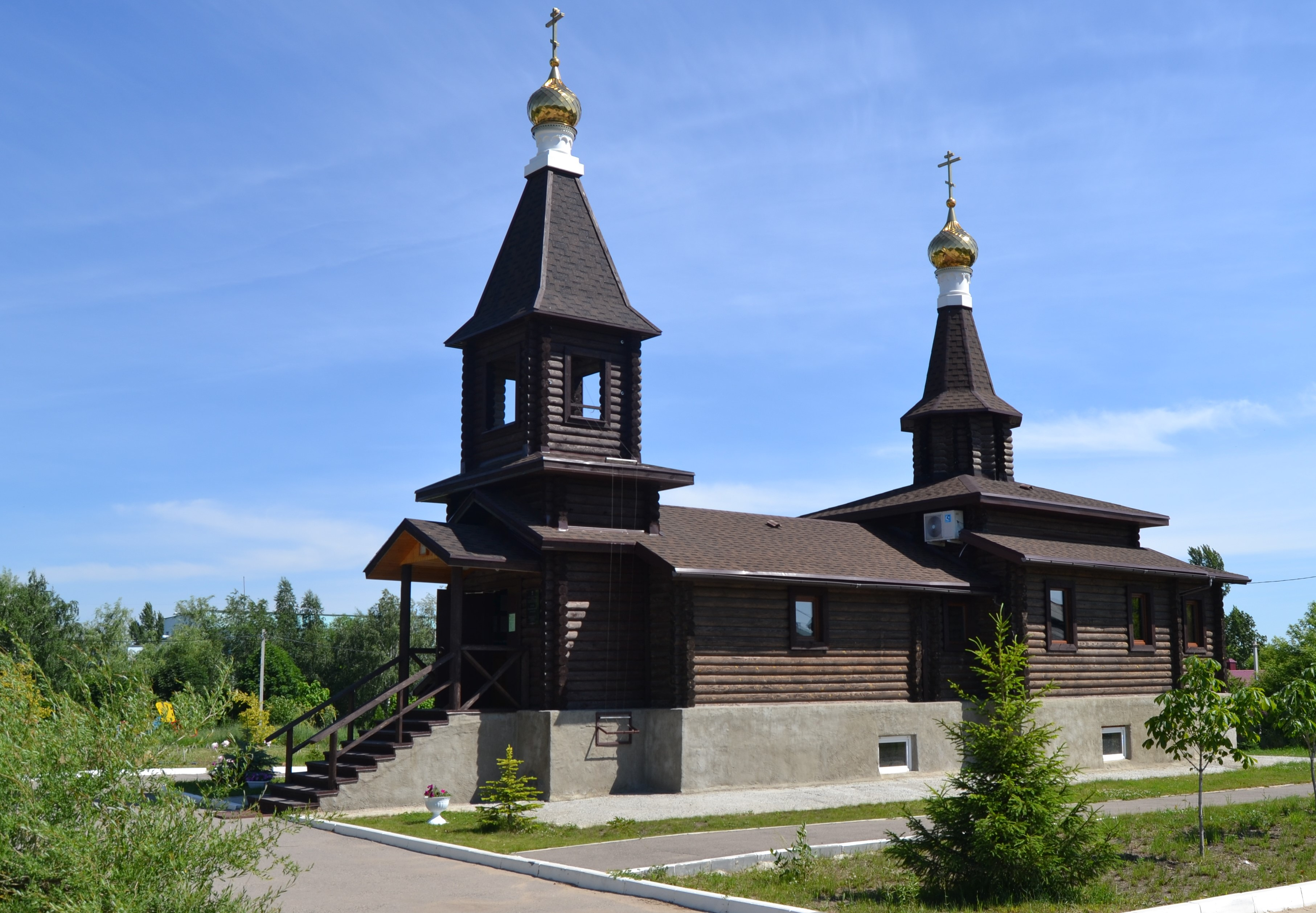
- Church of the Transfiguration of the Lord
- Interactive map of Sokolovy
- Location of Sokolovy Sokolovy (Saratov Oblast)
- Coordinates: 51.5701°N 45.8308°E
- Country: Russia
- Federal subject: Saratov Oblast
- Administrative district: Saratovsky District

Population (2010 Census)
  - Total: 6,009
  - Estimate (2021): 4,937 (−17.8%)
- Time zone: UTC+4 (MSK+1)
- Postal code: 410501
- OKTMO ID: 63643158051

Sokolovy (Russian: Соколовый) is an urban locality (an urban-type settlement) in Saratovsky District of Saratov Oblast, Russia. Population: 6,009 (2010 census); 6,229 (2002 census);
