= Perelyubsky District =

Perelyubsky District Перелюбский район
- District
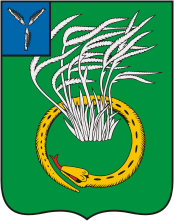
- Coat of arms
- Location of Perelyubsky District in Saratov Oblast
- Coordinates: 51°51′N 50°21′E
- Country: Russia
- Federal subject: Saratov Oblast
- Established: July 23, 1928
- Administrative center: Perelyub

Area
  - Total: 3,700 km^{2} (1,400 sq mi)

Population (2010 Census)
  - Total: 14,747
  - Density: 4.0/km^{2} (10/sq mi)
  - Urban: 0%
  - Rural: 100%

Administrative structure
  - Inhabited localities: 46 rural localities

Municipal structure
  - Municipally incorporated as: Perelyubsky Municipal District
  - Municipal divisions: 0 urban settlements, 12 rural settlements
- Time zone: UTC+4 (MSK+1)
- OKTMO ID: 63634000
- Website: http://perelyub.sarmo.ru/

Perelyubsky District (Russian: Перелюбский райо́н) is an administrative and municipal district (raion), one of the thirty-eight in Saratov Oblast, Russia. It is located in the east of the oblast. The area of the district is 3,700 square kilometers (1,400 sq mi). Its administrative center is the rural locality (a selo) of Perelyub. Population: 14,747 (2010 Census); 19,280 (2002 Census); 18,131 (1989 Soviet census). The population of Perelyub accounts for 32.4% of the district's total population.
