= Nikolay Pankov =

Russian politician (born 1965)

- Николай Панков
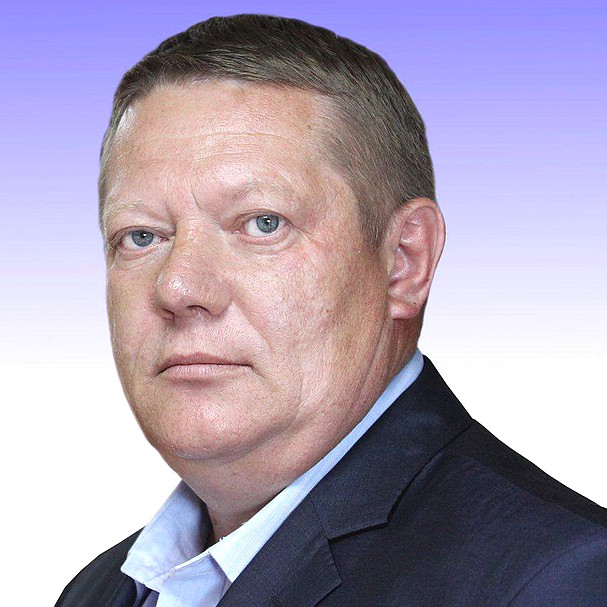

Member of the State Duma for Saratov Oblast
- Incumbent
- Assumed office 5 October 2016
- Preceded by: constituency re-established
- Constituency: Balakovo (No. 164)

Member of the State Duma (Party List Seat)
- In office 24 December 2007 – 5 October 2016

Personal details
- Born: 5 January 1965 (age 61) Kavlei, Ardatovsky District, Nizhny Novgorod Oblast, Russian SFSR Soviet Union
- Party: United Russia
- Education: Saratov State Vavilov Agrarian University

Nikolay Vasilyevich Pankov (Russian: Никола́й Васи́льевич Панко́в; born 5 January 1965) is a Russian political figure and a deputy of the 5th, 6th, 7th, and 8th State Dumas.

== Education ==
Pankov graduated from the Saratov Institute of Agricultural Mechanization in 1992, the Volga Region Academy of Civil Service in 1995, and the Russian Presidential Academy of Civil Service in 2010.

In 2008, he was granted Candidate of Sciences in Economics degree.

== Career ==
In 1994, Pankov started working in the Saratov Oblast Duma as a consultant of the secretariat of the chairman of the regional parliament. In 1996, he started working in the administration of the Saratov Oblast. From 2001 to 2005, he was the assistant and then head of the secretariat of the Deputy Chairman of the State Duma of the Russian Federation Vyacheslav Volodin. In October 2005, he was elected deputy of the Saratov Oblast Duma of the 4th convocation. In 2007, he was elected deputy of the 5th State Duma. In 2011, 2016, and 2021, Pankov was re-elected as deputy of the 6th, 7th, and 8th State Dumas, respectively.

== Sanctions ==
He was sanctioned by the UK government in 2022 in relation to the Russo-Ukrainian War.

== Awards ==
- Certificate of Honour from the Government of the Russian Federation (2019)
- President's commendation (2016)
- Order of Honour (Russia) (2012)
- Medal of the Order "For Merit to the Fatherland", 2nd degree (1998)

== Personal life ==
Pankov is married and has a daughter.
