= Tatishchevo (air base) =

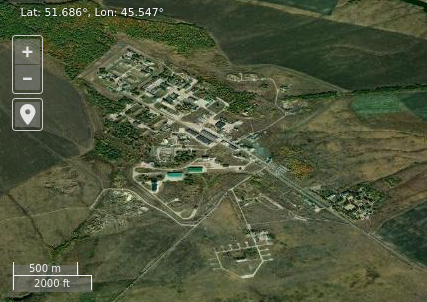
- Satellite imagery of Tatishchevo military airbase
- IATA: none; ICAO: none

Summary
- Airport type: Military
- Operator: Strategic Rocket Forces
- Location: Saratov Oblast
- Elevation AMSL: 787 ft / 240 m
- Coordinates: 51°41′10″N 45°32′50″E
- Interactive map of Tatishchevo

Runways
Direction	Length		Surface
Direction	ft	m	Surface
07/25		80x30	Concrete
07/25		700x80	Ground

Tatishchevo is a military airbase in the Tatishchevsky District of Saratov Oblast, Russia. It is operated by Strategic Rocket Forces of Russia (RVSN).

The base is located 2 km (1.2 mi) north-west of the settlement of Tatishchevo.

The airbase serves the special helicopter squadron of RVSN (Mil Mi-8).

It has missile silos with UR-100N and RT-2PM2 ICBMs.

== See also ==
- List of military airbases in Russia
