= Dukhovnitskoye =

Dukhovnitskoye Духовницкое
- Work settlement
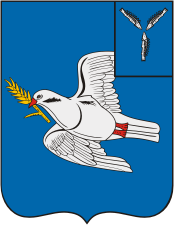
- Coat of arms
- Interactive map of Dukhovnitskoye
- Location of Dukhovnitskoye Dukhovnitskoye (Saratov Oblast)
- Coordinates: 52°29′N 48°12′E
- Country: Russia
- Federal subject: Saratov Oblast
- Administrative district: Dukhovnitsky District
- Founded: 1778

Population (2010 Census)
  - Total: 5,338
  - Estimate (2021): 4,628 (−13.3%)

Administrative status
  - Capital of: Dukhovnitsky District
- Time zone: UTC+4 (MSK+1)
- Postal codes: 413900, 413901
- OKTMO ID: 63614151051

Dukhovnitskoye (Russian: Духовницкое) is an urban locality (a work settlement) and the administrative center of Dukhovnitsky District in Saratov Oblast, Russia, located on the Volga River. Population: 5,338 (2010 census); 5,987 (2002 census); 6,545 (1989 Soviet census).
