= Mikhaylovsky, Saratov Oblast =

Closed settlement in Saratov Oblast, Russia

Mikhaylovsky Михайловский
- Settlement
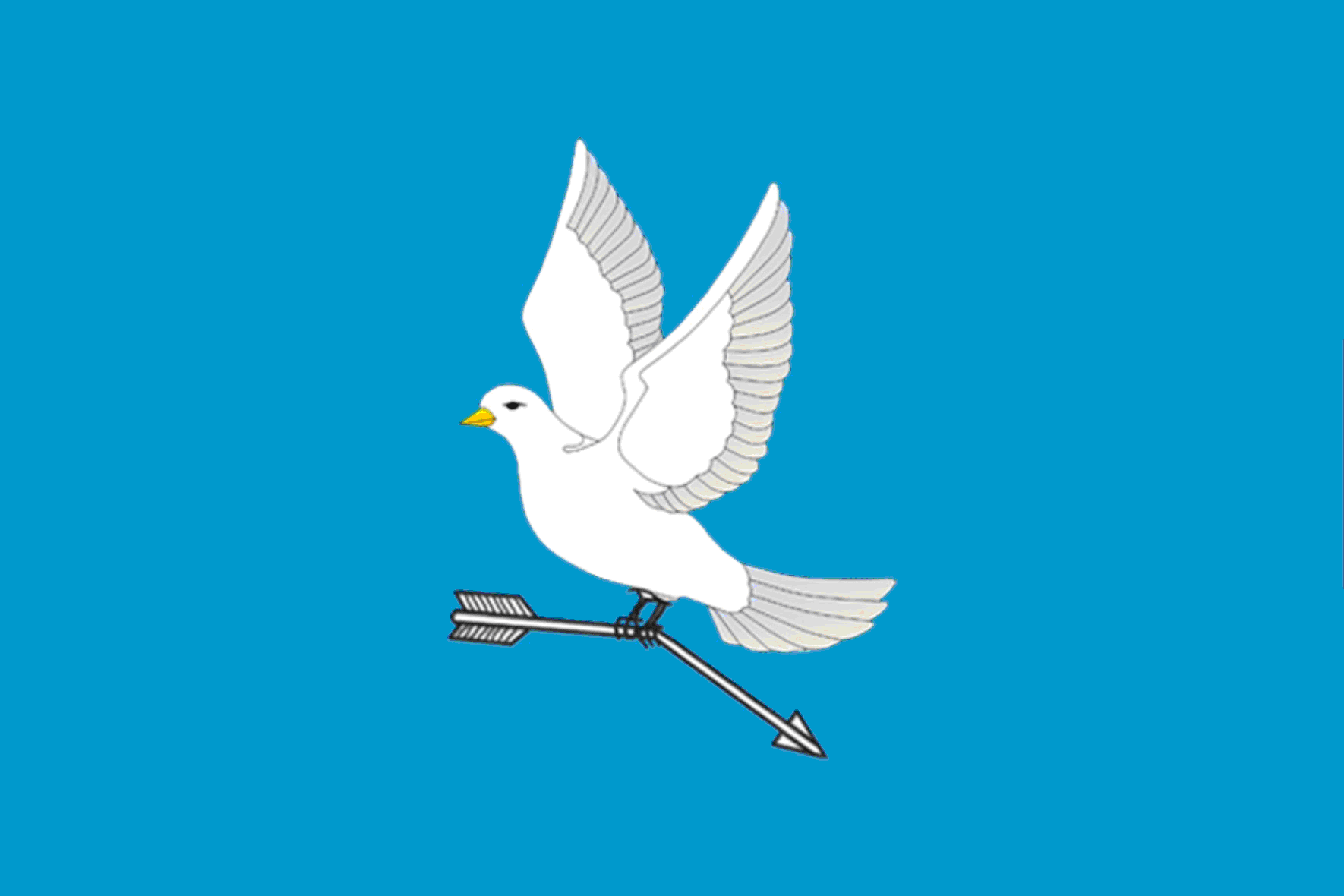
- Flag
- Interactive map of Mikhaylovsky
- Location of Mikhaylovsky Mikhaylovsky (Saratov Oblast)
- Coordinates: 51°47′40″N 48°34′46″E
- Country: Russia
- Federal subject: Saratov Oblast
- Founded: 2002
- Rural locality status since: 2002

Population (2010 Census)
  - Total: 2,328
  - Estimate (2021): 2,439 (+4.8%)

Administrative status
  - Subordinated to: closed administrative-territorial formation of Mikhaylovsky
  - Capital of: closed administrative-territorial formation of Mikhaylovsky

Municipal status
  - Urban okrug: Mikhaylovsky Urban Okrug
  - Capital of: Mikhaylovsky Urban Okrug
- Time zone: UTC+4 (MSK+1)
- Postal code: 413540
- OKTMO ID: 63760000101

Mikhaylovsky (Russian: Михайловский) is a closed rural locality (a settlement) in Saratov Oblast, Russia. Population: 2,328 (2010 census).

== History ==
It was founded in 2002.

== Administrative and municipal status ==
Within the framework of administrative divisions, it is incorporated as the closed administrative-territorial formation of Mikhaylovsky—an administrative unit with the status equal to that of the districts. As a municipal division, the closed administrative-territorial formation of Mikhaylovsky is incorporated as Mikhaylovsky Urban Okrug.
