= Tatishchevo, Saratov Oblast =

Tatishchevo Татищево
- Urban-type settlement
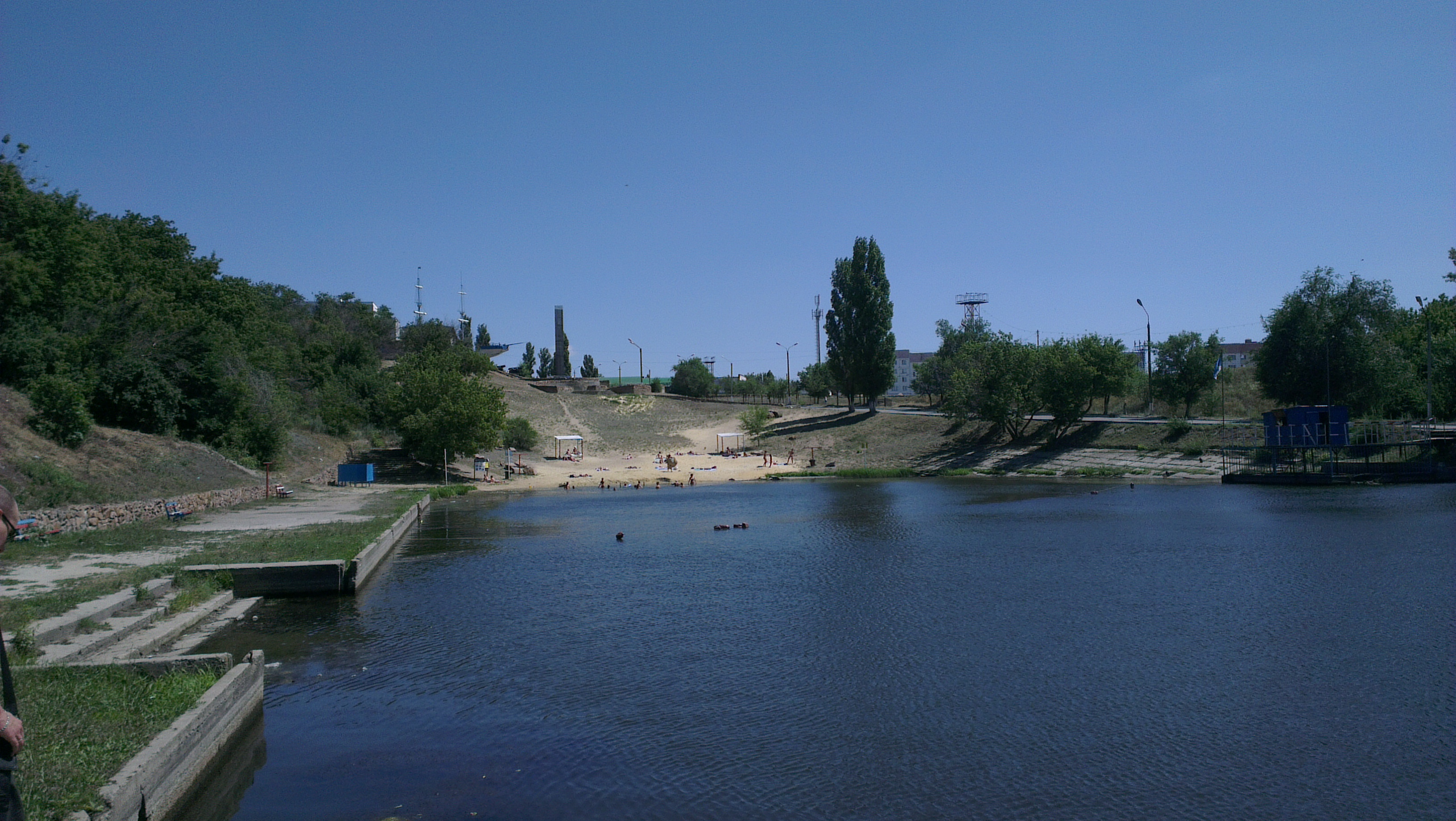

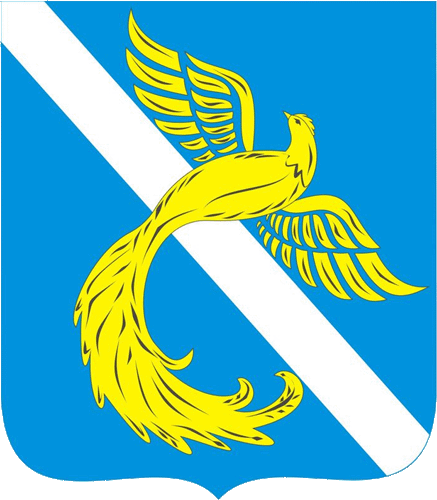
- Coat of arms
- Interactive map of Tatishchevo
- Location of Tatishchevo Tatishchevo (Saratov Oblast)
- Coordinates: 51.6721°N 45.5966°E
- Country: Russia
- Federal subject: Saratov Oblast
- Administrative district: Tatishchevsky District
- Founded: 1890

Population (2010 Census)
  - Total: 7,491
  - Estimate (2021): 7,235 (−3.4%)
- Time zone: UTC+4 (MSK+1)
- Postal codes: 412170, 412173
- OKTMO ID: 63646151051

Tatishchevo (Russian: Татищево) is an urban locality (an urban-type settlement) in Tatishchevsky District of Saratov Oblast, Russia. Population: 7,491 (2010 census); 7,432 (2002 census); 16,472 (1989 Soviet census).

The Tatishchevo air base is located near the settlement.

== History ==
The settlement was founded in 1890.

During World War II, in 1941, the 5th Infantry Division of the Polish Anders' Army was formed and stationed in Tatishchevo. Poles were housed in makeshift camps in dire conditions, mostly in tents and dugouts, and suffered from shortages of food, medicine, warm clothing and footwear. Due to extreme cold, the Poles were relocated to Kyrgyzstan in early 1942.
