= Nikolay Sukhoy =

Ukrainian Russian Politician

- Николай Сухой
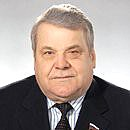
- Sukhoy in 1993

Member of the State Duma
- In office December 1993 – 24 December 2007

Deputy Minister of Land Reclamation and Water Management
- In office 1987–1990

Personal details
- Born: Nikolay Avksentyevich Sukhoy; 5 March 1941 (age 85) Stanislavchyk, Kyiv Oblast, Ukrainian SSR, Soviet Union
- Party: United Russia

Nikolay Avksentyevich Sukhoy (Russian: Николай Авксентьевич Сухой; born 5 March 1941) is a Ukrainian-born Russian politician and government official who served as a member of the State Duma from 1993 to 2007.

In 1981, had been the head of the Main Directorate of the Capital Construction of the Ministry of Land Reclamation and Water Management of the Soviet Union, and was the Deputy Minister of Reclamation and Water Management of the Soviet Union from 1987 to 1990.

== Biography ==
Nikolay Sukhoy was born on 5 March 1941 in Stanislavchyk (now in the Bila Tserkva Raion of Kyiv Oblast).

In 1958, he was a worker in the construction of water farm facilities. In 1969, he received higher education with a degree in the “engineer-hydraulic engineer” at the Moscow Hydromeliorative Institute. He underwent training in the specialty "Economics of the National Economy" in the highest economic courses under the USSR State Planning Commission.

From 1974 to 1977, he worked at the Ministry of Land Reclamation and Water Management of the Soviet Union, First Deputy Head of the Main Directorate of Capital Construction. From 1977 to 1980 he worked in the USSR State Planning Commission as an adviser on economic issues in the Middle East. From 1981 to 1987, he worked at the Ministry of Land Reclamation and Water Management by the head of the Main Department of Capital Construction. From 1987 to 1990 he worked as deputy minister of reclamation and water economy of the Soviet Union. From 1990 to 1992 he worked in the State Concern "Rosvodstroy", and was its First Deputy Chairman. He was a member of the Communist Party of the Soviet Union until 1991.

In December 1993, Sukhoy was elected a member of parliament, a deputy of the State Duma's first convocation. He was a member of the Committee on Agrarian Affairs, and was a member of the Agrarian Party of Russia faction. In 1995, he ran for election the State Duma on the lists of the Agrarian Party of Russia, according to the results of the distribution of mandates, but he did not get elected. However, in March 1998, he was elected back into the State Duma's second convocation in a by-election in the Balakovo single -mandate constituency No. 156. He was a member of the budget, taxes, banks and finances committee, was a member of the Agarian Party faction.

In September 1999, Sukhoy was re-elected for the Duma's third convocation from the Balakovo single -mandate constituency No. 156. In the State Duma he was a member of the Committee on Budget and Taxes, a member of the Commission for Considering the expenses of the federal budget aimed at ensuring the defence and state security of the Russian Federation, was part of the United Russia faction.

In September 2003, Sukhoy was re-elected to the State Duma's fourth convocation from the Engels single-mandate constituency No. 159. He was deputy chairman of the Committee on Budget and Taxes, a member of the commission for consideration of federal budget expenditures aimed at ensuring the defence and state security of the Russia, and was part of the "United Russia" party. In 2007, he left the State Duma. From that year until 2009, he was engaged in social activities.

Since 2009, Sukhoy has been the chairman of the Board of the Association "Association of Builders in the field of land reclamation and water economy". He is the chairman of the Council of the NP "Union of Waternicherasts and Meliorators". From 2013 to 2014 he was a member of the Public Council under the Ministry of Agriculture of Russia.

== Legislative activity ==
During Sukhoy's time as a member of the State Duma, he acted as a co-author of 37 legislative initiatives and amendments to draft federal laws.

== Honors ==
Sukhoy was awarded the Order of Friendship in 2007.

== Family ==
Sukhoy is married and has a daughter.
