= Turkovsky District =

Turkovsky District Турковский район (Russian)
- District
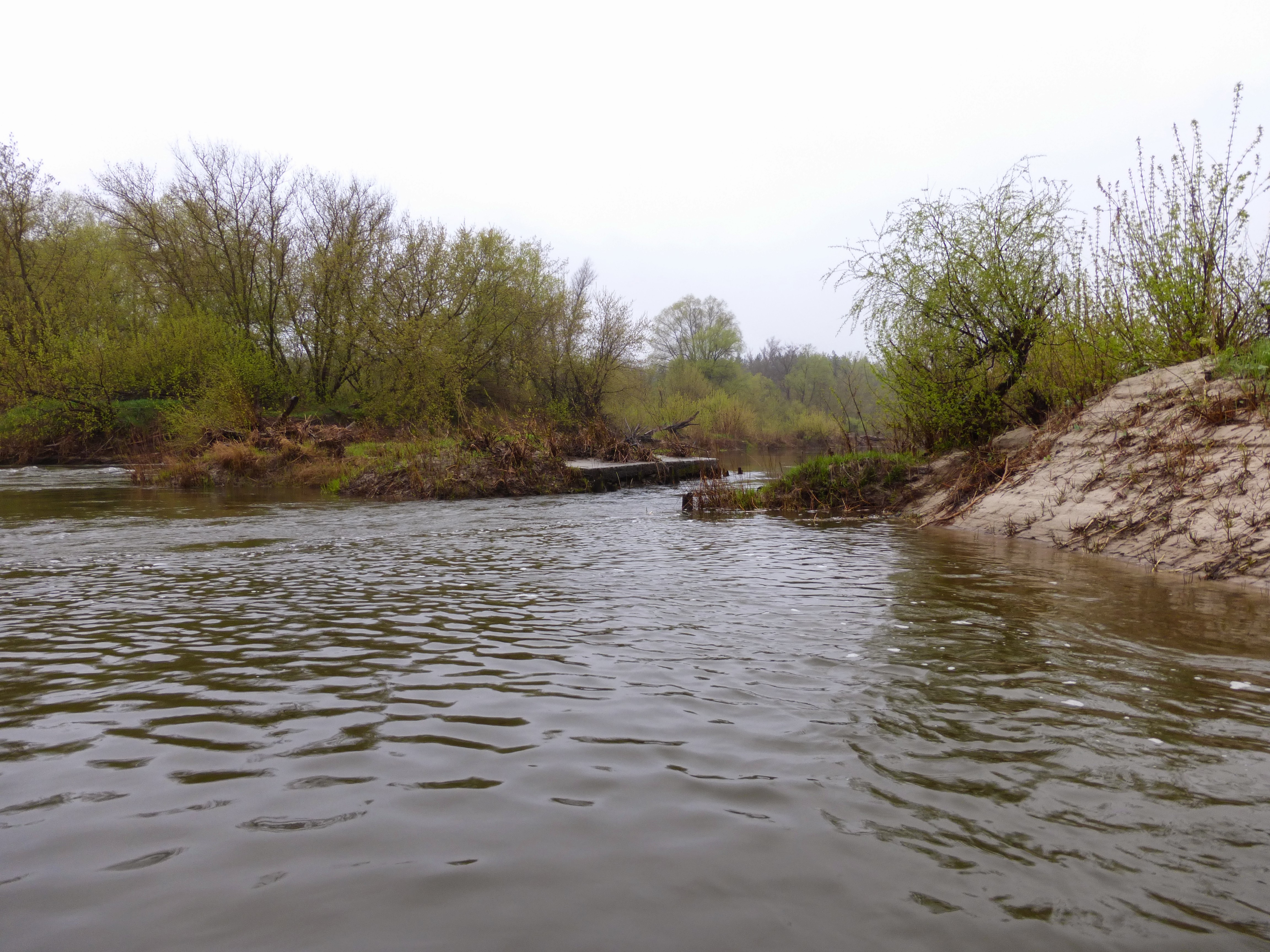
- Red Yar, Turkovsky District

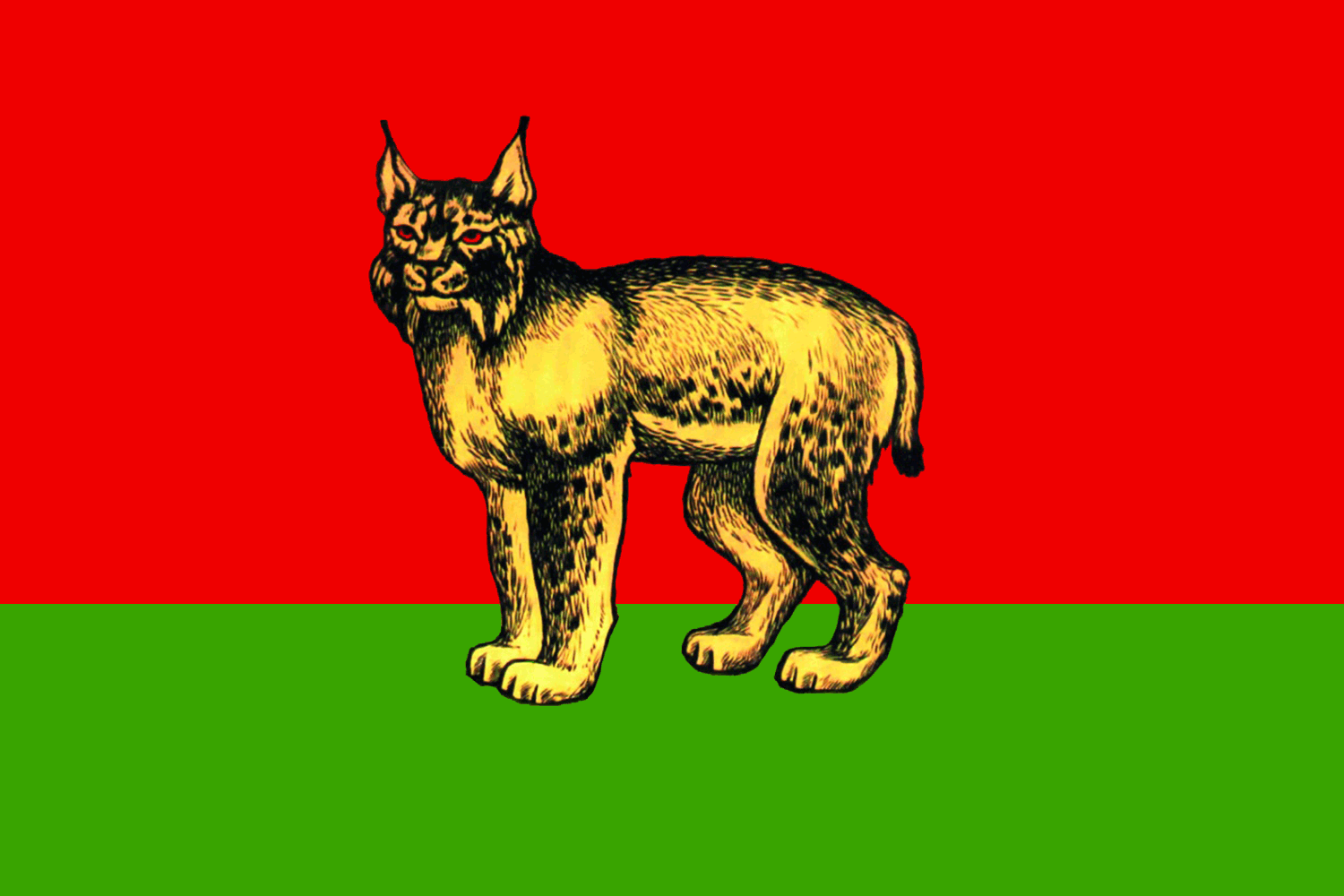
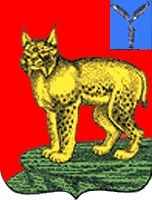
- Flag Coat of arms
- Location of Turkovsky District in Saratov Oblast
- Coordinates: 51°59′03″N 43°16′17″E
- Country: Russia
- Federal subject: Saratov Oblast
- Established: 23 July 1928
- Administrative center: Turki

Area
  - Total: 1,400 km^{2} (540 sq mi)

Population (2010 Census)
  - Total: 12,834
  - Density: 9.2/km^{2} (24/sq mi)
  - Urban: 47.7%
  - Rural: 52.3%

Administrative structure
  - Inhabited localities: 1 urban-type settlements, 49 rural localities

Municipal structure
  - Municipally incorporated as: Turkovsky Municipal District
  - Municipal divisions: 1 urban settlements, 6 rural settlements
- Time zone: UTC+4 (MSK+1)
- OKTMO ID: 63647000
- Website: http://turki.sarmo.ru/

Turkovsky District (Russian: Турковский райо́н) is an administrative and municipal district (raion), one of the thirty-eight in Saratov Oblast, Russia. It is located in the northwest of the oblast. The area of the district is 1,400 square kilometers (540 sq mi). Its administrative center is the urban locality (a work settlement) of Turki. Population: 12,834 (2010 Census); 15,852 (2002 census); 18,409 (1989 Soviet census). The population of Turki accounts for 47.7% of the district's total population.
