= Novoburassky District =

Novoburassky District Новобурасский район (Russian)
- District
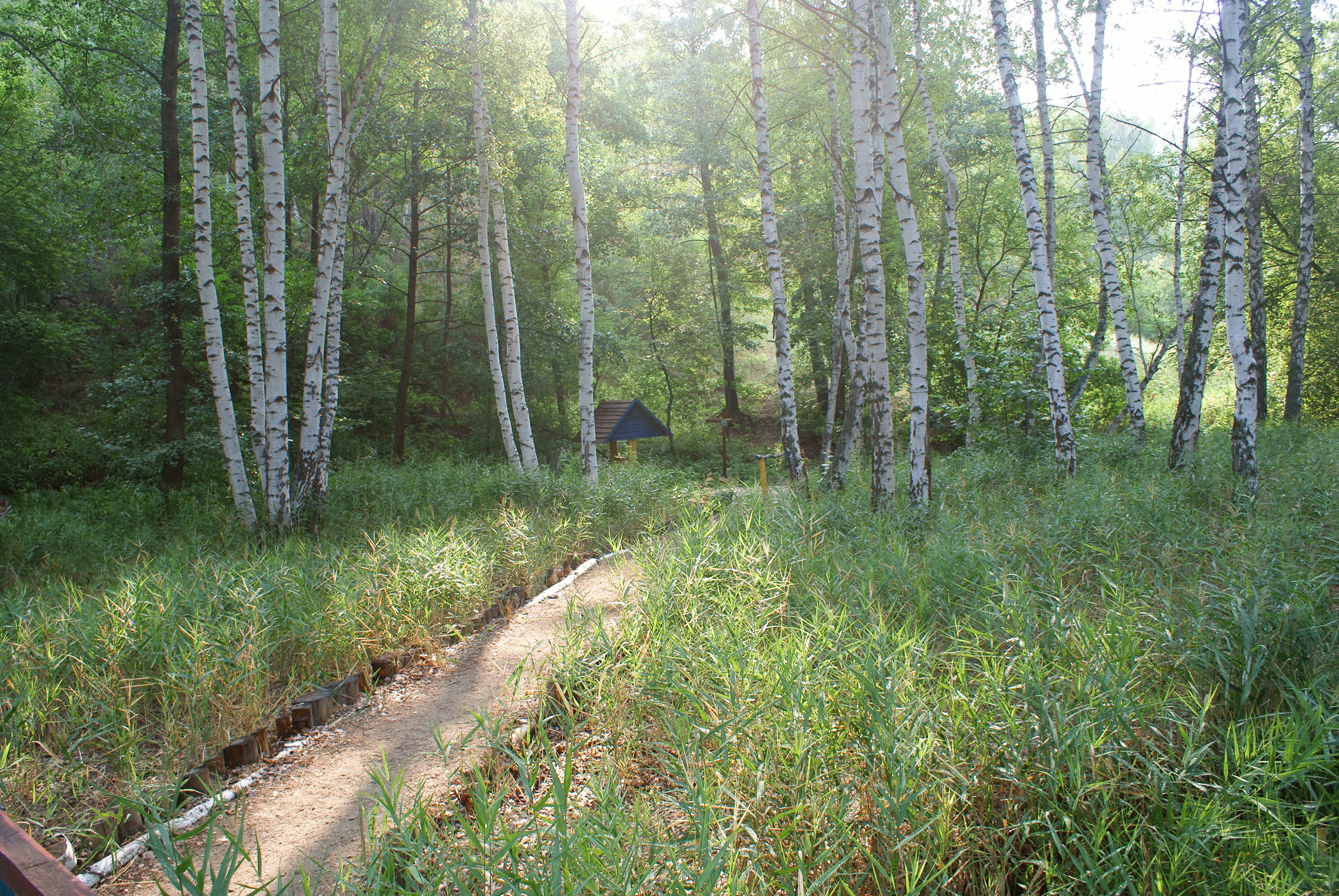
- Spring in the Kudeyarova mountains, Novoburassky District

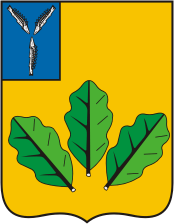
- Coat of arms
- Location of Novoburassky District in Saratov Oblast
- Coordinates: 52°07′51″N 46°04′44″E
- Country: Russia
- Federal subject: Saratov Oblast
- Established: 23 July 1928
- Administrative center: Novye Burasy

Area
  - Total: 1,700 km^{2} (660 sq mi)

Population (2010 Census)
  - Total: 16,359
  - Density: 9.6/km^{2} (25/sq mi)
  - Urban: 35.9%
  - Rural: 64.1%

Administrative structure
  - Inhabited localities: 1 urban-type settlements, 37 rural localities

Municipal structure
  - Municipally incorporated as: Novoburassky Municipal District
  - Municipal divisions: 1 urban settlements, 4 rural settlements
- Time zone: UTC+4 (MSK+1)
- OKTMO ID: 63629000
- Website: http://www.admnburasy.ru/

Novoburassky District (Russian: Новобурасский райо́н) is an administrative and municipal district (raion), one of the thirty-eight in Saratov Oblast, Russia. It is located in the north of the oblast. The area of the district is 1,700 square kilometers (660 sq mi). Its administrative center is the urban locality (a work settlement) of Novye Burasy. Population: 16,359 (2010 Census); 18,188 (2002 census); 16,703 (1989 Soviet census). The population of Novye Burasy accounts for 35.9% of the district's total population.
