= Baltaysky District =

Baltaysky District Балтайский район (Russian)
- District
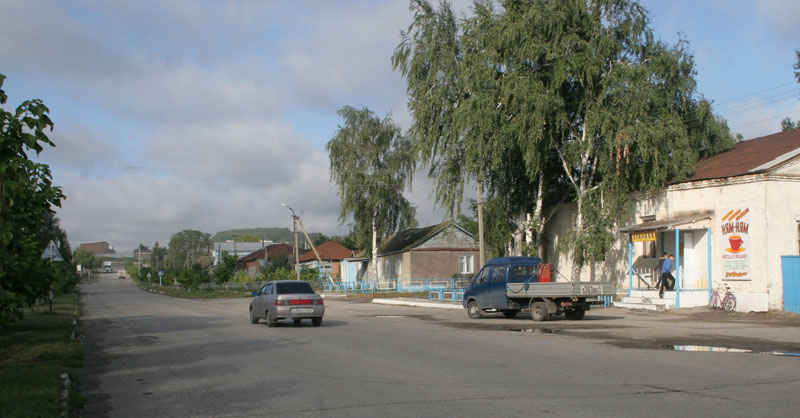
- A street in the selo of Baltay, the administrative center of Baltaysky District

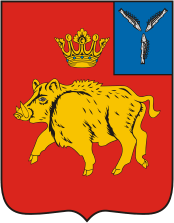
- Coat of arms
- Location of Baltaysky District in Saratov Oblast
- Coordinates: 52°27′56″N 46°37′57″E
- Country: Russia
- Federal subject: Saratov Oblast
- Established: 23 July 1928
- Administrative center: Baltay

Area
  - Total: 1,254 km^{2} (484 sq mi)

Population (2010 Census)
  - Total: 12,282
  - Density: 9.794/km^{2} (25.37/sq mi)
  - Urban: 0%
  - Rural: 100%

Administrative structure
  - Inhabited localities: 30 rural localities

Municipal structure
  - Municipally incorporated as: Baltaysky Municipal District
  - Municipal divisions: 0 urban settlements, 4 rural settlements
- Time zone: UTC+4 (MSK+1)
- OKTMO ID: 63609000
- Website: http://adm-baltay.ru/

Baltaysky District (Russian: Балтайский райо́н) is an administrative and municipal district (raion), one of the thirty-eight in Saratov Oblast, Russia. It is located in the north of the oblast. The area of the district is 1,254 square kilometers (484 sq mi). Its administrative center is the rural locality (a selo) of Baltay. Population: 12,282 (2010 Census); 13,722 (2002 census); 12,400 (1989 Soviet census). The population of Baltay accounts for 31.5% of the district's total population.
