= Dergachyovsky District =

Dergachyovsky District Дергачёвский район (Russian)
- District
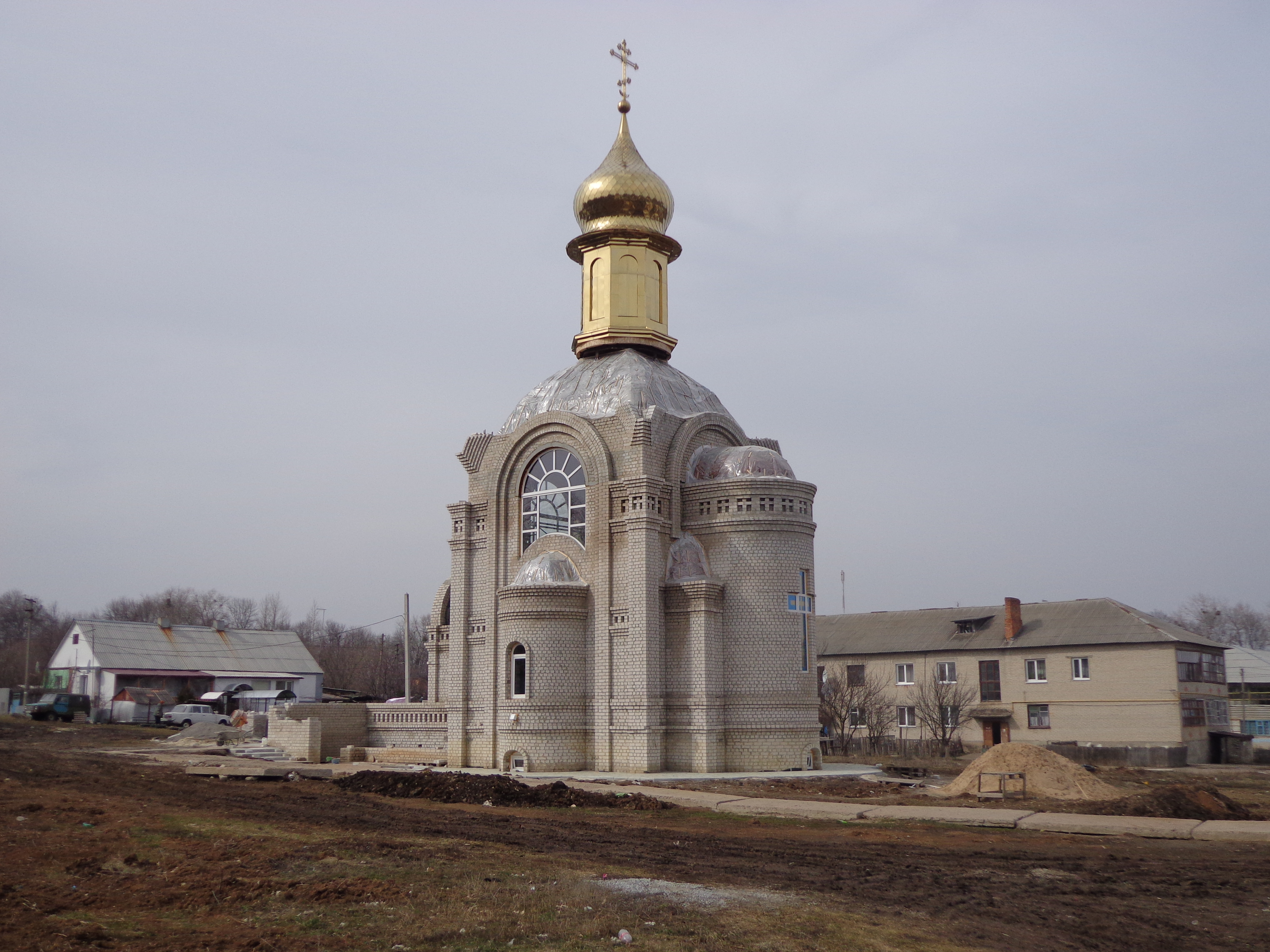
- Village church under construction, Dergachyovsky District

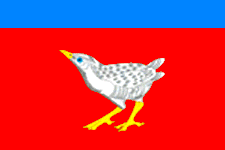
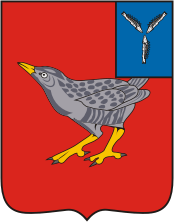
- Flag Coat of arms
- Location of Dergachyovsky District in Saratov Oblast
- Coordinates: 51°13′N 48°45′E
- Country: Russia
- Federal subject: Saratov Oblast
- Established: 23 July 1928
- Administrative center: Dergachi

Area
  - Total: 4,500 km^{2} (1,700 sq mi)

Population (2010 Census)
  - Total: 21,104
  - Density: 4.7/km^{2} (12/sq mi)
  - Urban: 39.2%
  - Rural: 60.8%

Administrative structure
  - Inhabited localities: 1 urban-type settlements, 46 rural localities

Municipal structure
  - Municipally incorporated as: Dergachyovsky Municipal District
  - Municipal divisions: 1 urban settlements, 12 rural settlements
- Time zone: UTC+4 (MSK+1)
- OKTMO ID: 63613000
- Website: http://dergachi.sarmo.ru/

Dergachyovsky District (Russian: Дергачёвский райо́н) is an administrative and municipal district (raion), one of the thirty-eight in Saratov Oblast, Russia. It is located in the southeast of the oblast. The area of the district is 4,500 square kilometers (1,700 sq mi). Its administrative center is the urban locality (a work settlement) of Dergachi. Population: 21,104 (2010 Census); 26,043 (2002 census); 29,971 (1989 Soviet census). The population of Dergachi accounts for 39.2% of the district's total population.
