= Svetly, Saratov Oblast =

Closed settlement in Saratov Oblast, Russia

Svetly Светлый
- Settlement
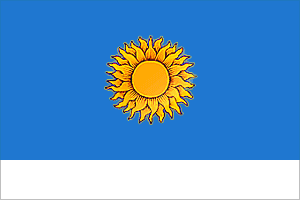
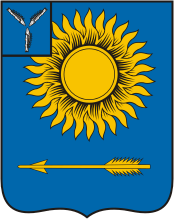
- Flag Coat of arms
- Interactive map of Svetly
- Location of Svetly Svetly (Saratov Oblast)
- Coordinates: 51°40′37″N 45°37′35″E
- Country: Russia
- Federal subject: Saratov Oblast
- Founded: 2002

Population (2010 Census)
  - Total: 12,493
  - Estimate (2021): 12,702 (+1.7%)

Administrative status
  - Subordinated to: closed administrative-territorial formation of Svetly
  - Capital of: closed administrative-territorial formation of Svetly

Municipal status
  - Urban okrug: Svetly Urban Okrug
  - Capital of: Svetly Urban Okrug
- Time zone: UTC+4 (MSK+1)
- Postal code: 412163
- OKTMO ID: 63775000051

Svetly (Russian: Све́тлый) is a closed rural locality (a settlement) in Saratov Oblast, Russia. Population: 12,493 (2010 census); 12,313 (2002 census).

== Administrative and municipal status ==
Within the framework of administrative divisions, it is incorporated as the closed administrative-territorial formation of Svetly—an administrative unit with the status equal to that of the districts. As a municipal division, the closed administrative-territorial formation of Svetly is incorporated as Svetly Urban Okrug.
