= Engels constituency =

Legislative constituency in Russia

Engels single-member constituency
- Constituency of the Russian State Duma

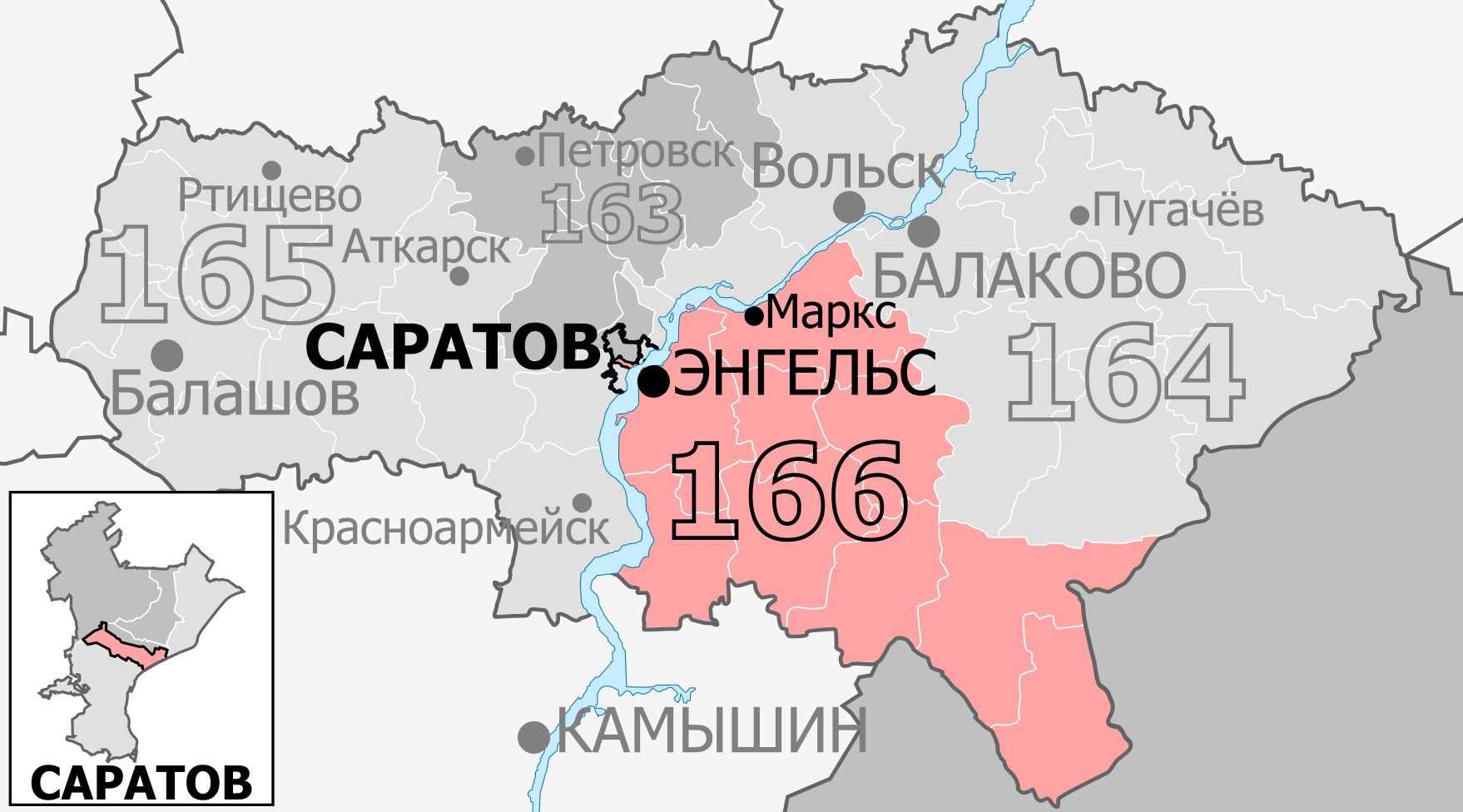
- Constituency boundaries since 2016
- Deputy: Aleksandr Yanklovich; United Russia
- Federal subject: Saratov Oblast
- Districts: Saratov (Oktyabrsky), Aleksandrovo-Gaysky, Engelssky, Fyodorovsky, Krasnokutsky, Marksovsky, Novouzensky, Pitersky, Rovensky, Sovetsky
- Voters: 453,543 (2026)

The Engels constituency (No.167 (Note: No.158 in 1993-1995, No.159 in 1995-2007, No.166 in 2016–2026)) is a Russian legislative constituency in the Saratov Oblast. It covers southern and southeastern parts of Saratov Oblast and is anchored in the city of Engels.

The constituency has been represented since 2026 by United Russia deputy Aleksandr Yanklovich, Hero of Russia, former Member of Saratov Oblast Duma and retired Rosgvardiya podpolkovnik, who won the open seat left vacant following the resignation of one-term United Russia deputy Alexander Strelyukhin in May 2025.

== Boundaries ==
1993–2007: Engels, Engelssky District, Fyodorovsky District, Krasnokutsky District, Marks, Marksovsky District, Rovensky District, Saratov (Oktyabrsky, Volzhsky), Saratovsky District, Sovetsky District
The constituency covered parts of Saratov, including the city historic centre, and southern Saratov Oblast with towns of Engels and Marks.

2016–present: Alexandrovo-Gaysky District, Engelssky District, Fyodorovsky District, Krasnokutsky District, Marksovsky District, Novouzensky District, Pitersky District, Rovensky District, Saratov (Oktyabrsky), Sovetsky District
The constituency was re-created for the 2016 election. It retained its position in southern Saratov Oblast, but lost Volzhsky city district of Saratov and suburban Saratovsky District, instead gaining rural territories in the south-eastern corner of the region.

== Members elected ==
| Election | Member | Party |
|---|---|---|
| 1993 | Nikolay Lysenko | Independent |
| 1995 | Oleg Mironov (Note: in 1998 was appointed Commissioner of Human Rights in Russia) | Communist Party |
| 1998 | Vasily Desyatnikov | Independent |
| 1999 | Sergey Afanasyev | Communist Party |
| 2003 | Nikolay Sukhoy | United Russia |
| 2007 | Proportional representation - no election by constituency | |
| 2011 | Proportional representation - no election by constituency | |
| 2016 | Vasily Maksimov | United Russia |
| 2021 | Aleksandr Strelyukhin (Note: appointed Deputy Chairman of the Government of Saratov Oblast in May 2025) | United Russia |
| 2026 | Aleksandr Yanklovich | United Russia |

== Election results ==
=== 1993 ===
Summary of the 12 December 1993 Russian legislative election in the Engels constituency
| Candidate | Party | Votes | % |
|---|---|---|---|
| Nikolay Lysenko | Independent | 58,579 | 20.69% |
| Oleg Mironov | Communist Party | 41,683 | 14.72% |
| Viktor Malkov | Independent | 24,823 | 8.77% |
| Viktor Markov | Choice of Russia | 20,508 | 7.24% |
| Denis Yastrebov | Yavlinsky–Boldyrev–Lukin | 20,237 | 7.15% |
| Aleksey Malayev | Independent | 19,748 | 6.97% |
| Alexey Chernyshov | Independent | 19,527 | 6.90% |
| Vladimir Veshnev | Party of Russian Unity and Accord | 14,148 | 5.00% |
| against all | | 39,015 | 13.78% |
| Total | | 283,162 | 100% |

=== 1995 ===
Summary of the 17 December 1995 Russian legislative election in the Engels constituency
| Candidate | Party | Votes | % |
|---|---|---|---|
| Oleg Mironov | Communist Party | 115,863 | 34.24% |
| Vyacheslav Maltsev | Party of Workers' Self-Government | 55,890 | 16.52% |
| Vladimir Yuzhakov | Democratic Choice of Russia – United Democrats | 32,460 | 9.59% |
| Viktor Koryakov | Liberal Democratic Party | 25,878 | 7.65% |
| Oleg Karpov | Our Home – Russia | 20,908 | 6.18% |
| Nikolay Semenets | Independent | 17,754 | 5.25% |
| Yuri Rustikov | Social Democrats | 7,374 | 2.18% |
| Aleksandr Polyakh | Independent | 6,637 | 1.96% |
| Anatoly Zhikharev | Independent | 4,947 | 1.46% |
| Ivan Borisov | Bloc of Independents | 3,188 | 0.94% |
| Valentin Panichev | Independent | 4,947 | 1.46% |
| Vladimir Sanatin | Beer Lovers Party | 2,692 | 0.80% |
| Sergey Potrusov | Independent | 2,114 | 0.62% |
| Nikolay Myasnikov | Party of Economic Freedom | 1,962 | 0.58% |
| against all | | 30,425 | 8.99% |
| Total | | 338,345 | 100% |

=== 1998 ===
Summary of the 18 October 1998 Russian by-election in the Engels single-member constituency
| Candidate | Party | Votes | % |
|---|---|---|---|
| Vasily Desyatnikov | Independent | 76,766 | 41.46% |
| Marina Alyoshina | Independent | 33,614 | 18.16% |
| Sergey Semyonov | Independent | 33,423 | 18.05% |
| Ilya Konstantinov | Independent | 5,238 | 2.83% |
| Aleksandr Yevteyev | Independent | 4,492 | 2.43% |
| Konstantin Grizoglazov | Independent | 3,199 | 1.73% |
| against all | | 19,588 | 10.58% |
| Invalid ballots | | 8,819 | 4.76% |
| Total | | 185,139 | 100% |
| Registered voters/turnout | | 493,486 | 37.52% |

=== 1999 ===
Summary of the 19 December 1999 Russian legislative election in the Engels constituency
| Candidate | Party | Votes | % |
|---|---|---|---|
| Sergey Afanasyev | Communist Party | 85,959 | 25.28% |
| Vladimir Gusev | Independent | 67,532 | 19.86% |
| Viktor Tyukhtin | Yabloko | 43,773 | 12.87% |
| Marina Alyoshina | Fatherland – All Russia | 40,368 | 11.87% |
| Vladimir Yuzhakov | Union of Right Forces | 27,500 | 8.09% |
| Konstantin Grizoglazov | Liberal Democratic Party | 8,902 | 2.62% |
| Nikolay Soldatov | Communists and Workers of Russia - for the Soviet Union | 8,872 | 2.61% |
| Aleksandr Shinkarenko | Independent | 7,921 | 2.33% |
| Vyacheslav Belovolov | Russian Cause | 1,164 | 0.34% |
| against all | | 41,921 | 12.33% |
| Total | | 340,035 | 100% |

=== 2003 ===
Summary of the 7 December 2003 Russian legislative election in the Engels constituency
| Candidate | Party | Votes | % |
|---|---|---|---|
| Nikolay Sukhoy | United Russia | 140,965 | 47.02% |
| Sergey Afanasyev (incumbent) | Communist Party | 60,311 | 20.12% |
| Vladimir Yuzhakov | Union of Right Forces | 17,279 | 5.76% |
| Konstantin Grizoglazov | Liberal Democratic Party | 12,779 | 4.26% |
| Dmitry Oleynik | Rodina | 9,599 | 3.20% |
| Aleksandr Zhurbin | Yabloko | 9,283 | 3.10% |
| Tamara Mangusheva | United Russian Party Rus' | 5,006 | 1.67% |
| against all | | 39,184 | 13.07% |
| Total | | 300,024 | 100% |

=== 2016 ===
Summary of the 18 September 2016 Russian legislative election in the Engels constituency
| Candidate | Party | Votes | % |
|---|---|---|---|
| Vasily Maksimov | United Russia | 180,194 | 53.90% |
| Sergey Afanasyev | Communist Party | 63,412 | 18.97% |
| Dmitry Pyanykh | Liberal Democratic Party | 27,322 | 8.17% |
| Toktar Sarsengaliyev | A Just Russia | 19,846 | 5.94% |
| Aleksandr Grishantsov | Communists of Russia | 11,886 | 3.55% |
| Aleksey Mazepov | Party of Growth | 8,416 | 2.52% |
| Aleksandr Zhurbin | Yabloko | 6,745 | 2.02% |
| Konstantin Frolov | The Greens | 6,012 | 1.80% |
| Elnur Bayramov | People's Freedom Party | 3,887 | 1.16% |
| Total | | 334,399 | 100% |

=== 2021 ===
Summary of the 17-19 September 2021 Russian legislative election in the Engels constituency
| Candidate | Party | Votes | % |
|---|---|---|---|
| Aleksandr Strelyukhin | United Russia | 136,409 | 51.73% |
| Olga Alimova | Communist Party | 60,721 | 23.03% |
| Stanislav Denisenko | Liberal Democratic Party | 14,545 | 5.52% |
| Artyom Chebotaryov | A Just Russia — For Truth | 14,445 | 5.48% |
| Yevgeny Yevstafyev | Communists of Russia | 8,567 | 3.25% |
| Sergey Bugayenko | Party of Pensioners | 7,959 | 3.02% |
| Anastasia Uchakina | New People | 6,916 | 2.62% |
| Dmitry Lipensky | Yabloko | 4,242 | 1.61% |
| Vladimir Torgashev | Rodina | 3,041 | 1,15% |
| Total | | 263,712 | 100% |

=== 2026 ===
Summary of the 18-20 September 2026 Russian legislative election in the Engels constituency
| Candidate | Party | Votes | % |
|---|---|---|---|
| Aleksandr Yanklovich | United Russia | 161,891 | 53.51% |
| Olga Alimova | Communist Party | 80,457 | 26.59% |
| Dmitry Pyanykh | Liberal Democratic Party | 27,819 | 9.19% |
| Maria Bushuyeva | A Just Russia | 20,490 | 6.77% |
| Viktor Pantyukov | New People | 3,995 | 1.32% |
| Ksenia Chernova | Yabloko | 3,211 | 1.06% |
| Maksim Zhidkikh | Rodina | 2,064 | 0.68% |
| Aleksey Abrosimov | The Greens | 1,290 | 0.43% |
| Total | | | 100% |
