= Dukhovnitsky District =

Dukhovnitsky District Духовницкий район (Russian)
- District
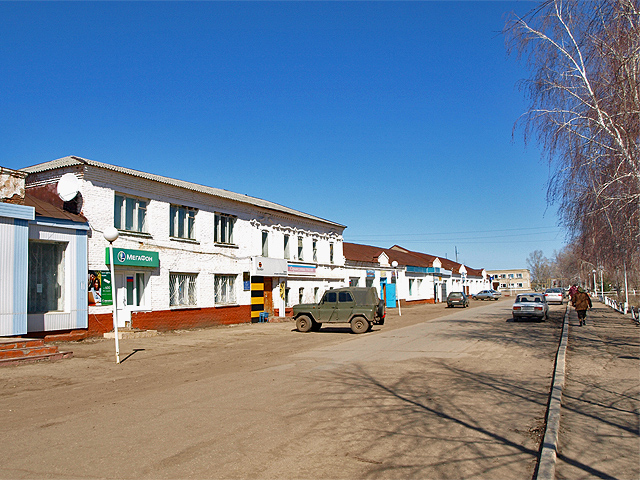
- Duhovnitskoye, Dukhovnitsky District

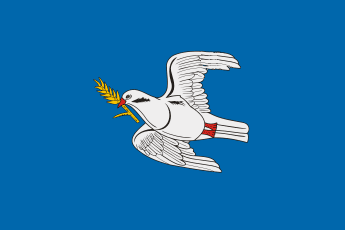
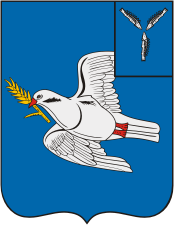
- Flag Coat of arms
- Location of Dukhovnitsky District in Saratov Oblast
- Coordinates: 52°29′N 48°12′E
- Country: Russia
- Federal subject: Saratov Oblast
- Administrative center: Dukhovnitskoye

Area
  - Total: 2,000 km^{2} (770 sq mi)

Population (2010 Census)
  - Total: 12,951
  - Density: 6.5/km^{2} (17/sq mi)
  - Urban: 41.2%
  - Rural: 58.8%

Administrative structure
  - Inhabited localities: 1 urban-type settlements, 20 rural localities

Municipal structure
  - Municipally incorporated as: Dukhovnitsky Municipal District
  - Municipal divisions: 1 urban settlements, 6 rural settlements
- Time zone: UTC+4 (MSK+1)
- OKTMO ID: 63614000
- Website: http://duhovnitskoe.sarmo.ru/

Dukhovnitsky District (Russian: Духовницкий райо́н) is an administrative and municipal district (raion), one of the thirty-eight in Saratov Oblast, Russia. It is located in the northeast of the oblast. The area of the district is 2,000 square kilometers (770 sq mi). Its administrative center is the urban locality (a work settlement) of Dukhovnitskoye. Population: 12,951 (2010 Census); 15,300 (2002 census); 16,511 (1989 Soviet census). The population of Dukhovnitskoye accounts for 41.2% of the district's total population.
