= Tatishchevsky District =

Tatishchevsky District Татищевский район (Russian)
- District
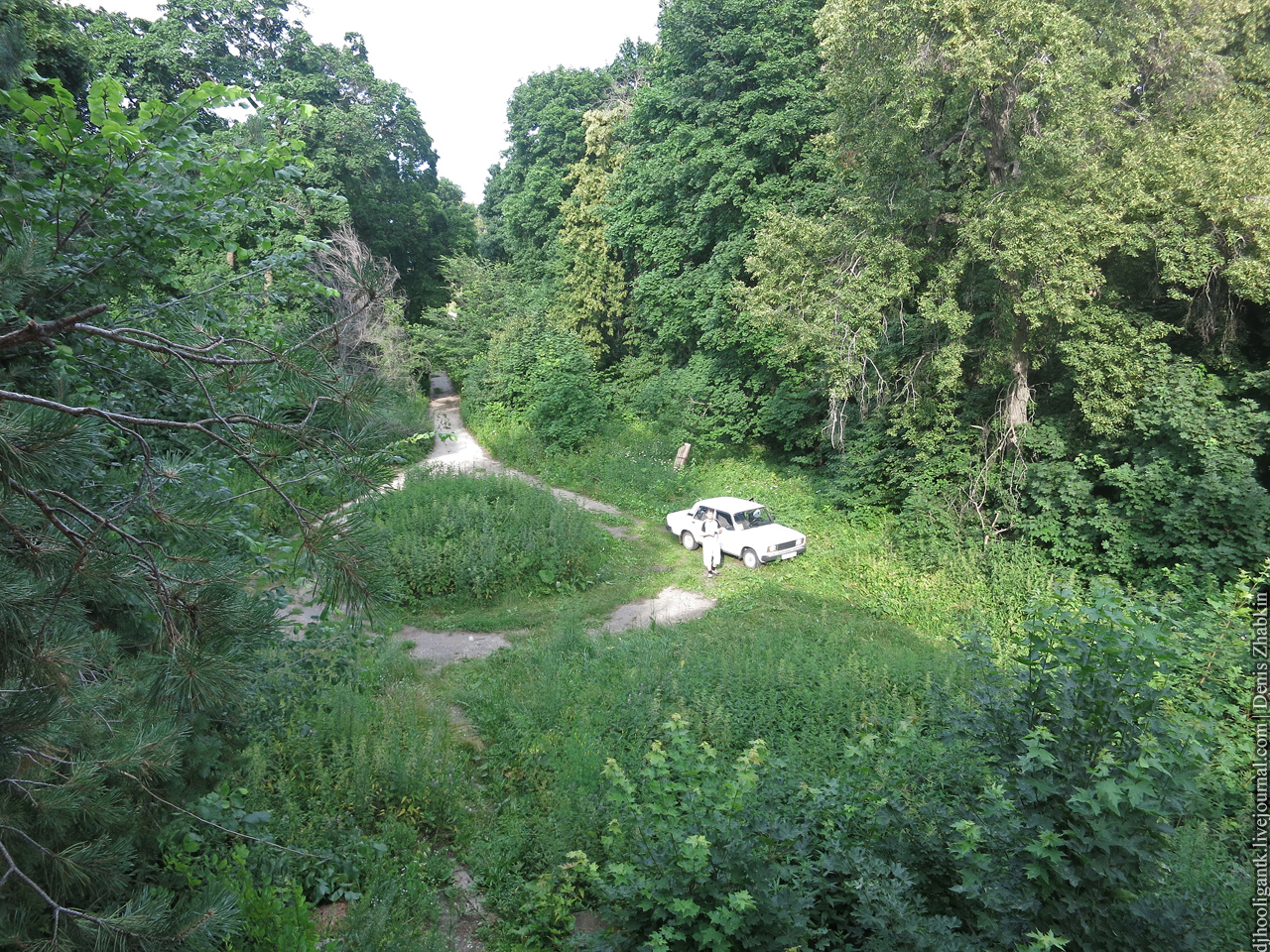
- Polchaninovsky homestead park, Tatishchevsky District

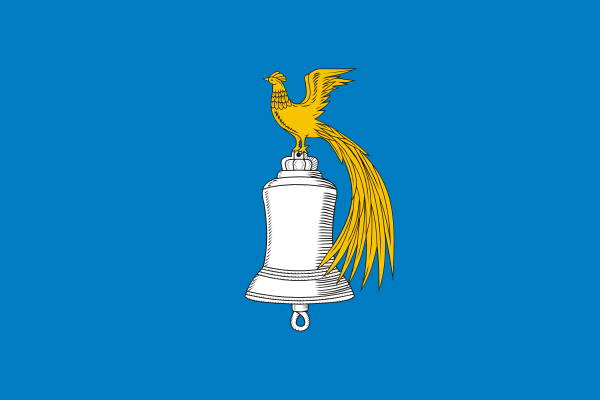
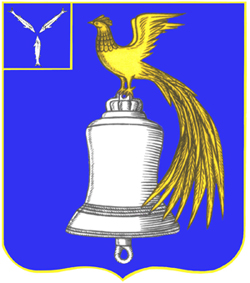
- Flag Coat of arms
- Location of Tatishchevsky District in Saratov Oblast
- Coordinates: 51°40′14″N 45°35′11″E
- Country: Russia
- Federal subject: Saratov Oblast
- Established: 23 July 1928
- Administrative center: Tatishchevo

Area
  - Total: 2,100 km^{2} (810 sq mi)

Population (2010 Census)
  - Total: 28,405
  - Density: 14/km^{2} (35/sq mi)
  - Urban: 26.4%
  - Rural: 73.6%

Administrative structure
  - Inhabited localities: 1 urban-type settlements, 56 rural localities

Municipal structure
  - Municipally incorporated as: Tatishchevsky Municipal District
  - Municipal divisions: 1 urban settlements, 6 rural settlements
- Time zone: UTC+4 (MSK+1)
- OKTMO ID: 63646000
- Website: http://tatishevo.saratov.gov.ru/

Tatishchevsky District (Russian: Татищевский райо́н) is an administrative and municipal district (raion), one of the thirty-eight in Saratov Oblast, Russia. It is located in the center of the oblast. The area of the district is 2,100 square kilometers (810 sq mi). Its administrative center is the urban locality (a work settlement) of Tatishchevo. Population: 28,405 (2010 Census); 29,506 (2002 census); 36,502 (1989 Soviet census). The population of Tatishchevo accounts for 26.4% of the district's total population.

== Military ==
The 60th Rocket Division of Strategic Missile Forces is based on the district's territory, as well as the Tatishchevo airbase, with 69 UR-100NUTTH and 40 Topol-M.
