= 2022 Saratov Oblast Duma election =

- 9–11 September 2022
- Turnout: 53.69%
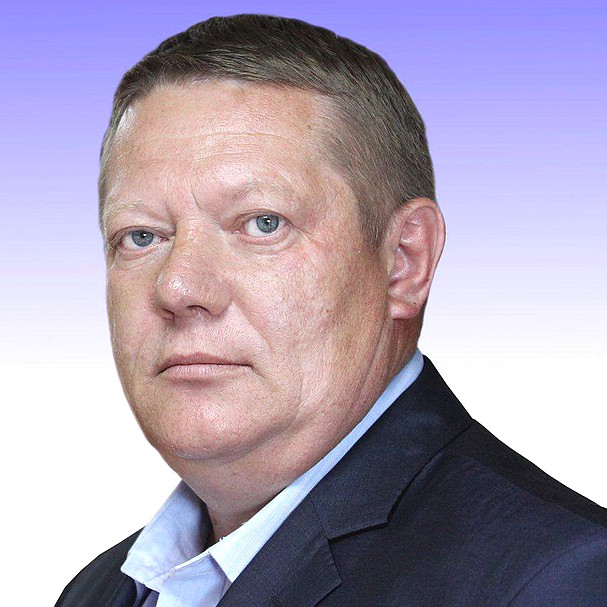

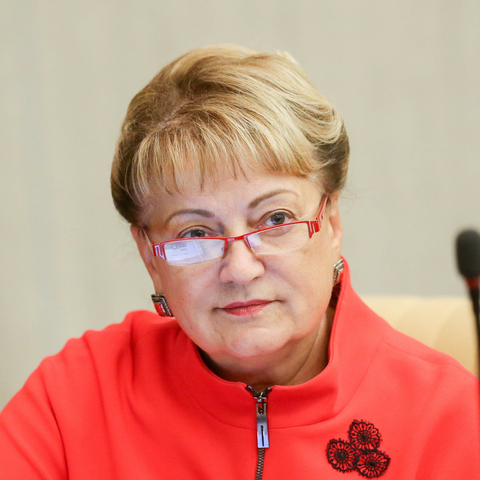

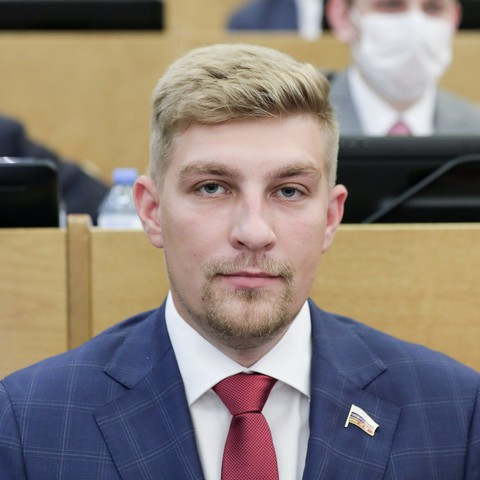

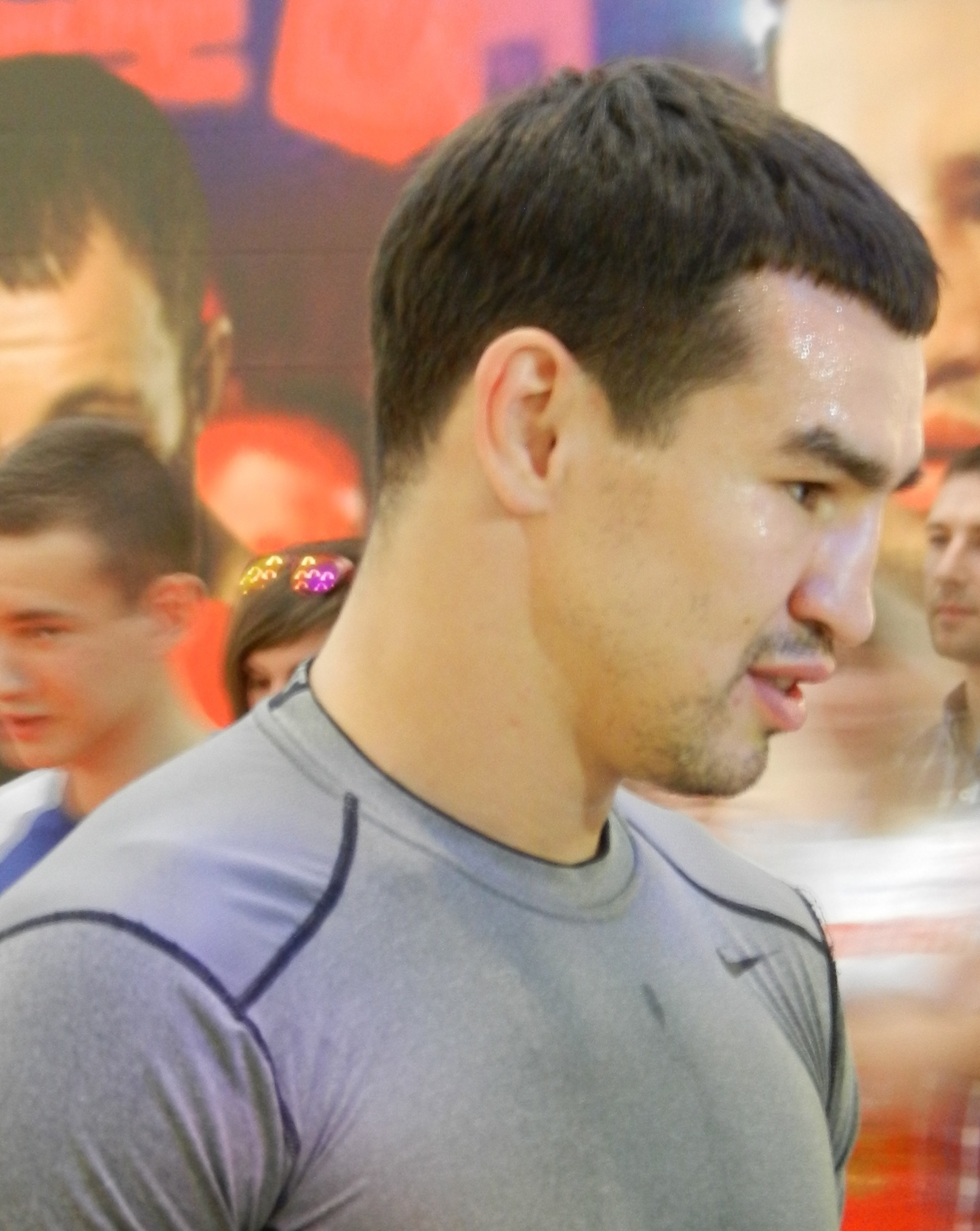
	Majority party	Minority party	Third party
Candidate	Nikolay Pankov	Olga Alimova	Dmitry Pyanykh
Leader	Dmitry Medvedev	Gennady Zyuganov	Leonid Slutsky
Party	United Russia	CPRF	LDPR
Last election	36 seats, 66.84%	5 seats, 14.67%	2 seats, 8.06%
Seats won	29	5	2
Seat change	▼7	0	0
Popular vote	597,854	141,829	91,255
Percentage	60.50%	14.35%	9.24%
Swing	▼6.34%	▼0.32%	▲1.18%
	Fourth party	Fifth party	Sixth party
		NL	CPCR
Candidate	Artem Chebotarev	Andrey Zobnin	Aleksandr Grishantsov
Leader	Sergey Mironov	Aleksey Nechayev	Sergey Malinkovich
Party	SR-ZP	New People	Communists of Russia
Last election	1 seat, 5.75%	Did not exist	0 seats, 2.26%
Seats won	2	1	0
Seat change	▲1	Did not exist	0
Popular vote	67,057	35,000	29,232
Percentage	6.79%	3.54%	2.96%
Swing	▲1.04%	Did not exist	▼0.70%

The 2022 Saratov Oblast Duma election took place on 9–11 September 2022, on common election day, coinciding with the gubernatorial election. All 40 seats in the Oblast Duma were up for reelection.

== Electoral system ==
Under current election laws, the Oblast Duma is elected for a term of five years, with parallel voting. 10 seats are elected by party-list proportional representation with a 5% electoral threshold, with the other half elected in 30 single-member constituencies by first-past-the-post voting. Until 2022 the number of mandates allocated in proportional and majoritarian parts were standing at 23 and 22 seats, respectively (so the total number of seats in the Duma had been reduced from 45 to 40). Seats in the proportional part are allocated using the Imperiali quota, modified to ensure that every party list, which passes the threshold, receives at least one mandate.

== Candidates ==
=== Party lists ===
To register regional lists of candidates, parties need to collect 0.5% of signatures of all registered voters in Saratov Oblast. Prior to the election oblast-wide part of party lists was abolished with only territorial groups retaining.

The following parties were relieved from the necessity to collect signatures:

- United Russia
- Communist Party of the Russian Federation
- A Just Russia — Patriots — For Truth
- Liberal Democratic Party of Russia
- New People

№	Party	Territorial groups' leaders	Candidates	Territorial groups	Status
1	Communists of Russia	Yekaterina Ivanova • Aleksandr Grishantsov • Aleksandr Gladnikov • Aleksandra Gryakova • Sergey Demidov • Oksana Baturina • Yury Serdyuchenko • Yevgeny Yevstafyev	16	8	Registered
2	Liberal Democratic Party	Nikita Grigoryevsky • Oleg Meshcheryakov • Aleksandr Vologdin • Maksim Ramikh • Roman Letov • Igor Shirshov • Dmitry Pyanykh • Dmitry Grigorenko	29	8	Registered
3	Communist Party	Olga Alimova • Aleksandr Anidalov • Andrey Karasev • Olga Lubkova • Denis Mamayev • Nikolay Zadornov • Sergey Shitov • Aleksandr Narayevsky • Aleksandr Myakishev	25	9	Registered
4	New People	Renata Suleymanova • Andrey Zobnin • Andrey Dmitriyev • Anastasia Shcherbakova • Ilya Cherkashin • Maria Vernokvas • Roman Minayev • Anastasia Uchakina	24	8	Registered
5	United Russia	Mikhail Isayev • Aleksey Antonov • Tatyana Yerokhina • Nikolay Pankov • Natalya Kazimova • Andrey Vorobyev • Valery Radayev • Aleksandr Strelyukhin	40	8	Registered
6	A Just Russia — For Truth	Ashot Mkoyan • Aleksey Yemelyanov • Sergey Zernyshkin • Karina Arslanova • Svetlana Berezina • Ilya Starikov • Artem Chebotarev • Nadzhia Kurmokayeva	27	8	Registered
7	Rodina	Sergey Demin • Andrey Kornev • Sergey Safonov • Viktor Bezyazychny • Aleksandr Vantsov • Vladimir Torgashev • Nikolay Dubasov • Aleksandr Labyznov	16	8	Registered
	Yabloko	Dmitry Konnychev • Aleksandr Soshnikov • Ilya Kozlyakov • Kirill Rumyantsev • Aleksandr Zhurbin • Anna Yefimova • Valery Zarodin • Aleksandr Fedorenko	19	8	Failed to qualify

New People and Rodina will take part in Saratov Oblast legislative election for the first time.

=== Single-mandate constituencies ===
30 single-mandate constituencies were formed in Saratov Oblast, an increase of 8 seats since last redistricting in 2017.

To register, candidates in single-mandate constituencies need to collect 3% of signatures of registered voters in the constituency.

Number of candidates in single-mandate constituencies
Party	Candidates	
Party	Nominated	Registered
United Russia	30	29
Communist Party	30	29
Liberal Democratic Party	29	29
A Just Russia — For Truth	28	27
New People	24	23
Communists of Russia	6	6
Rodina	1	1
Independent	25	20
Total	173	164

== Results ==
Summary of the 9–11 September 2022 Saratov Oblast Duma election results
Party	Party list					Constituency		Total	
Party	Votes	%	±pp	Seats	+/–	Seats	+/–	Seats	+/–
United Russia	597,854	60.50	▼6.34%	7	▼11	22	▲4	29	▼7
Communist Party	141,829	14.35	▼0.32%	1	▼2	4	▲2	5	0
Liberal Democratic Party	91,255	9.24	▲1.18%	1	0	1	0	2	0
A Just Russia — For Truth	67,057	6.79	▲1.04%	1	0	1	▲1	2	▲1
New People	35,000	3.54	New	0	New	1	New	1	New
Communists of Russia	29,232	2.96	▼0.70%	0	Steady	0	Steady	0	Steady
Rodina	15,902	1.61	New	0	New	1	New	1	New
Independents	—	—	—	—	—	0	▼1	0	▼1
Invalid ballots	9,978	1.01	▼0.1%	—	—	—	—	—	—
Total	988,111	100.00	—	10	▼13	30	▲8	40	▼5
Turnout	988,111	53.69	▼1.07%	—	—	—	—	—	—
Registered voters	1,840,460	100.00	—	—	—	—	—	—	—

Summary of the 9–11 September 2022 Saratov Oblast Duma election results by constituency
№	Candidate	Party	Votes	%
1	Aleksandr Yanklovich	United Russia	9,172	45.01%
1	Stanislav Soldatov	Communist Party	3,895	19.11%
1	Ilya Chebotarev	A Just Russia — For Truth	3,361	16.49%
1	Sergey Khimichev	Liberal Democratic Party	2,227	10.93%
1	Sergey Mironenko	Independent	1,366	6.70%
1	Total		20,377	100%
1	Source:			
2	Aleksandr Vantsov	Rodina	9,848	32.82%
2	Natalya Kosyreva	United Russia	7,664	24.54%
2	Viktor Chervakov	Communist Party	3,831	12.77%
2	Kirill Grachev	A Just Russia — For Truth	3,332	11.10%
2	Roman Letov	Liberal Democratic Party	2,634	8.78%
2	Yevgeny Kurbashnov	New People	2,403	8.01%
2	Total		30,006	100%
2	Source:			
3	Vladimir Yesipov	Communist Party	13,086	35.42%
3	Vadim Mingalev	United Russia	11,350	30.72%
3	Svetlana Berezina	A Just Russia — For Truth	5,491	14.86%
3	Sergey Khlyzov	Liberal Democratic Party	3,380	9.15%
3	Viktoria Chernyshova	New People	3,053	8.26%
3	Total		36,947	100%
3	Source:			
4	Mikhail Isayev	United Russia	10,571	61.94%
4	Nikolay Bondarenko	Communist Party	3,413	20.00%
4	Denis Boldyrev	Independent	864	5.06%
4	Olga Bondareva	A Just Russia — For Truth	813	4.76%
4	Aleksandr Bessolitsyn	Liberal Democratic Party	627	3.67%
4	Aleksey Dragun	New People	597	3.50%
4	Total		17,066	100%
4	Source:			
5	Andrey Yeremin	United Russia	9,829	48.72%
5	Aleksandr Uteshev	Communist Party	4,804	23.81%
5	Nikita Grigoryevsky	Liberal Democratic Party	2,173	10.77%
5	Andrey Garkavy	A Just Russia — For Truth	1,325	6.57%
5	Yevgenia Antonova	New People	1,009	5.00%
5	Olga Raseyeva	Independent	580	2.87%
5	Total		20,175	100%
5	Source:			
6	Natalya Bakal	United Russia	11,050	47.34%
6	Vitaly Vykhristov	Communist Party	3,614	15.48%
6	Sergey Udalov	Liberal Democratic Party	2,713	11.62%
6	Ivan Udodov	A Just Russia — For Truth	2,519	10.79%
6	Aleksandr Minakov	New People	1,807	7.74%
6	Kirill Yefimov	Independent	1,447	6.20%
6	Total		23,344	100%
6	Source:			
7	Yelena Stiforova	United Russia	11,987	47.03%
7	Sergey Yarandaykin	Communist Party	5,731	22.48%
7	Dmitry Sergiyenko	Liberal Democratic Party	2,998	11.76%
7	Nikita Zlotnikov	New People	2,291	8.99%
7	Aleksandr Burlov	Independent	2,287	8.97%
7	Total		25,490	100%
7	Source:			
8	Dmitry Petrov	United Russia	15,411	52.10%
8	Andrey Karasev	Communist Party	5,203	17.59%
8	Aleksey Yemelyanov	A Just Russia — For Truth	3,277	11.08%
8	Oleg Kremeshny	Liberal Democratic Party	2,276	7.69%
8	Aleksey Trebunsky	New People	1,987	6.72%
8	Kristina Shanayeva	Independent	1,226	4.14%
8	Total		29,582	100%
8	Source:			
9	Aleksandr Burmak	United Russia	11,598	44.90%
9	Mikhail Pozdnyakov	Communist Party	3,891	15.06%
9	Yekaterina Melnikova	Liberal Democratic Party	3,069	11.88%
9	Anastasia Bobyleva	A Just Russia — For Truth	2,848	11.03%
9	Andrey Zobnin	New People	2,298	8.90%
9	Tatyana Yerofeyeva	Independent	2,047	7.92%
9	Total		25,832	100%
9	Source:			
10	Roman Gribov	United Russia	20,202	49.19%
10	Andrey Bazhenov	Communist Party	8,416	20.49%
10	Sergey Zavidov	Liberal Democratic Party	4,833	11.77%
10	Sergey Yermakov	A Just Russia — For Truth	3,828	9.32%
10	Aleksey Yefimov	New People	3,546	8.63%
10	Total		41,066	100%
10	Source:			
11	Aleksandr Anidalov (incumbent)	Communist Party	8,065	36.69%
11	Tatyana Bogdanova	United Russia	6,875	31.28%
11	Nail Khanbekov	Independent	2,061	9.38%
11	Aleksey Klopov	A Just Russia — For Truth	1,612	7.33%
11	Dmitry Semenov	New People	1,511	6.87%
11	Anton Shuvakin	Liberal Democratic Party	1,428	6.50%
11	Total		21,979	100%
11	Source:			
12	Yevgeny Kovalev	United Russia	10,133	43.91%
12	Vasily Safronov	Communist Party	3,854	16.70%
12	Maria Bykova	Liberal Democratic Party	2,957	12.81%
12	Nikolay Vlasov	A Just Russia — For Truth	2,146	9.30%
12	Makar Pushkarev	New People	1,763	7.64%
12	Albina Starchenko	Independent	1,606	6.96%
12	Total		23,076	100%
12	Source:			
13	Aleksey Antonov	United Russia	10,239	46.54%
13	Aleksandr Sorokin	Communist Party	4,543	20.65%
13	Konstantin Kiselev	Liberal Democratic Party	2,975	13.52%
13	Ashot Mkoyan	A Just Russia — For Truth	2,126	9.66%
13	Anatoly Shostak	New People	1,831	8.32%
13	Total		22,002	100%
13	Source:			
14	Svetlana Medvedeva	United Russia	23,013	53.53%
14	Stanislav Graf	Communist Party	5,251	12.21%
14	Dmitry Dmitriyev	Liberal Democratic Party	3,836	8.92%
14	Yulia Pronkina	New People	3,491	8.12%
14	Ilya Gavrilov	A Just Russia — For Truth	3,483	8.10%
14	Natalya Silantyeva	Independent	3,394	7.89%
14	Total		42,993	100%
14	Source:			
15	Vadim Rogozhin	United Russia	22,253	51.66%
15	Aleksandr Vologdin	Liberal Democratic Party	5,740	13.32%
15	Vadim Plyasunov	Independent	4,365	10.13%
15	Yevgeny Savinov	New People	3,607	8.37%
15	Maksim Kovalchuk	Communist Party	3,567	8.28%
15	Valentin Kobzar	A Just Russia — For Truth	2,941	6.83%
15	Total		43,077	100%
15	Source:			
16	Sergey Cherednikov	United Russia	23,469	53.77%
16	Lyubov Stepura	Communist Party	6,844	15.68%
16	Oleg Meshcheryakov	Liberal Democratic Party	4,795	10.99%
16	Aleksandr Ustinov	A Just Russia — For Truth	3,223	7.38%
16	Yury Demin	New People	3,176	7.28%
16	Total		43,646	100%
16	Source:			
17	Vasily Kravtsov	United Russia	22,812	53.59%
17	Igor Shirshov	Liberal Democratic Party	7,324	17.20%
17	Lyudmila Berezina	Communist Party	6,712	15.77%
17	Leonid Babintsev	A Just Russia — For Truth	2,905	6.82%
17	Dmitry Lobzhanidze	Independent	2,276	5.35%
17	Total		42,570	100%
17	Source:			
18	Sergey Gladkov (incumbent)	United Russia	19,191	59.85%
18	Aleksandr Myakishev	Communist Party	4,995	15.58%
18	Aleksandr Nikulenko	A Just Russia — For Truth	2,502	7.80%
18	Rinat Alyushev	Liberal Democratic Party	2,282	7.12%
18	Aleksandr Storozhev	Independent	1,843	5.75%
18	Total		32,066	100%
18	Source:			
19	Aleksey Koltsov	United Russia	19,867	53.49%
19	Lyubov Penina	Communist Party	4,615	12.42%
19	Yegor Lesnoy	Liberal Democratic Party	3,560	9.58%
19	Ilya Starikov	A Just Russia — For Truth	3,317	8.93%
19	Anna Rud	New People	3,018	8.13%
19	Natalya Tynyanaya	Independent	1,975	5.32%
19	Total		37,143	100%
19	Source:			
20	Stanislav Denisenko (incumbent)	Liberal Democratic Party	14,284	38.26%
20	Maria Fedosenkova	United Russia	11,885	31.84%
20	Olga Abrosimova	Communist Party	5,872	15.73%
20	Pavel Verbitsky	A Just Russia — For Truth	2,110	5.65%
20	Aleksandr Trofimov	Communists of Russia	1,467	3.93%
20	Anastasia Uchakina	New People	1,437	3.85%
20	Total		37,333	100%
20	Source:			
21	Ilya Zakharov	New People	12,270	36.44%
21	Natalya Gichkina	United Russia	10,713	31.82%
21	Pavel Zhurkin	Communist Party	5,827	17.31%
21	Dmitry Grigorenko	Liberal Democratic Party	3,843	11.41%
21	Yevgeny Yevstafyev	Communists of Russia	871	2.59%
21	Total		33,671	100%
21	Source:			
22	Dmitry Polulyakh	United Russia	14,049	41.94%
22	Sergey Yudin	Communist Party	9,537	26.58%
22	Vladislav Meshcheryakov	Liberal Democratic Party	6,633	18.49%
22	Nadzhia Kurmokayeva	A Just Russia — For Truth	4,558	12.70%
22	Total		35,883	100%
22	Source:			
23	Artyom Chebotarev	A Just Russia — For Truth	12,076	36.57%
23	Oleg Maletsky	United Russia	9,646	29.21%
23	Andrey Yefimov	Communist Party	5,269	15.95%
23	Vladislav Savchenko	Liberal Democratic Party	3,389	10.26%
23	Yelena Nechayeva	New People	1,221	3.70%
23	Yury Serdyuchenko	Communists of Russia	850	2.57%
23	Total		33,026	100%
23	Source:			
24	Galina Tkacheva	United Russia	22,915	48.40%
24	Aleksandr Narayevsky	Communist Party	5,718	12.08%
24	Maria Shibalova	Independent	5,304	11.20%
24	Vyacheslav Kalinin	A Just Russia — For Truth	4,536	9.58%
24	Sergey Lityak	Liberal Democratic Party	4,089	8.64%
24	Roman Minayev	New People	3,596	7.60%
24	Total		47,346	100%
24	Source:			
25	Ivan Baboshkin (incumbent)	United Russia	16,855	46.16%
25	Olga Kalugina	Communist Party	6,268	17.17%
25	Yelena Ivakhnenko	Independent	5,190	14.21%
25	Anastasia Shcherbakova	New People	4,247	11.63%
25	Igor Vanyukov	Liberal Democratic Party	3,570	9.78%
25	Total		36,514	100%
25	Source:			
26	Sergey Shitov	Communist Party	12,129	36.66%
26	Anton Akhmadulin	A Just Russia — For Truth	9,688	29.28%
26	Andrey Dmitriyev	New People	5,129	15.50%
26	Vardan Sarkisyan	Independent	4,619	13.96%
26	Total		33,088	100%
26	Source:			
27	Olga Lubkova	Communist Party	14,957	42.02%
27	Yelena Davydova	United Russia	12,878	36.18%
27	Denis Maletin	Liberal Democratic Party	4,057	11.40%
27	Igor Dolganov	New People	1,979	5.56%
27	Karina Arslanova	A Just Russia — For Truth	1,043	2.93%
27	Total		35,596	100%
27	Source:			
28	Roman Irisov	United Russia	17,927	59.01%
28	Aleksandra Gryakova	Communists of Russia	4,281	14.09%
28	Anna Karmashova	A Just Russia — For Truth	2,781	9.15%
28	Aleksandr Pozelovsky	Liberal Democratic Party	2,350	7.74%
28	Aleksandr Urmanbayev	Independent	2,221	7.31%
28	Total		30,381	100%
28	Source:			
29	Vladimir Zemskov	United Russia	19,937	54.39%
29	Denis Mamayev	Communist Party	5,433	14.82%
29	Sergey Zernyshkin	A Just Russia — For Truth	3,028	8.26%
29	Rafael Yerlagayev	Liberal Democratic Party	2,407	6.57%
29	Marina Bezhkinskaya	Independent	2,368	6.46%
29	Aleksandr Gladnikov	Communists of Russia	2,335	6.37%
29	Total		36,654	100%
29	Source:			
30	Kirill Lavrentyev	United Russia	21,337	56.60%
30	Maksim Ramikh	Liberal Democratic Party	4,813	12.77%
30	Natalya Alimova	Communists of Russia	3,617	9.59%
30	Vladislav Nakayev	Independent	2,753	7.30%
30	Valery Lipatov	Communist Party	2,351	6.24%
30	Svetlana Chernova	A Just Russia — For Truth	2,055	5.45%
30	Total		37,699	100%
30	Source:			

Former Governor of Saratov Oblast Valery Radayev (United Russia) was appointed to the Federation Council, replacing retiring incumbent Oleg Alekseyev (United Russia).

== See also ==
- 2022 Russian regional elections
