= 2022 Saratov Oblast gubernatorial election =

← 2017	9–11 September 2022	2027 →
- Turnout: 53.71%
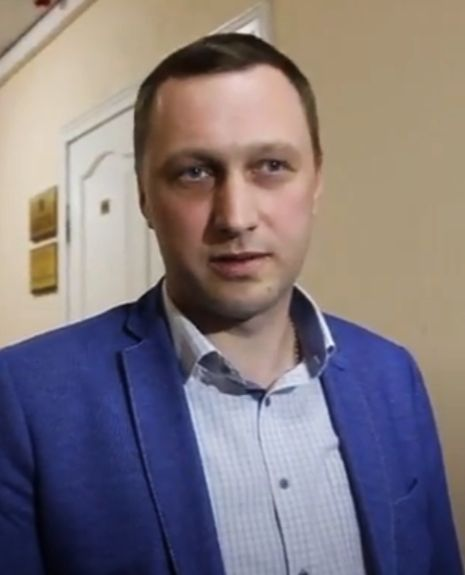

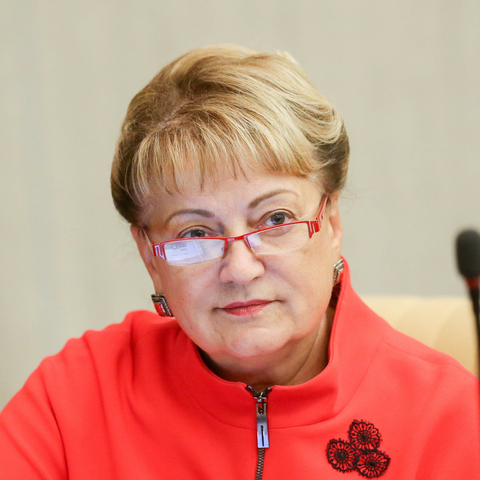

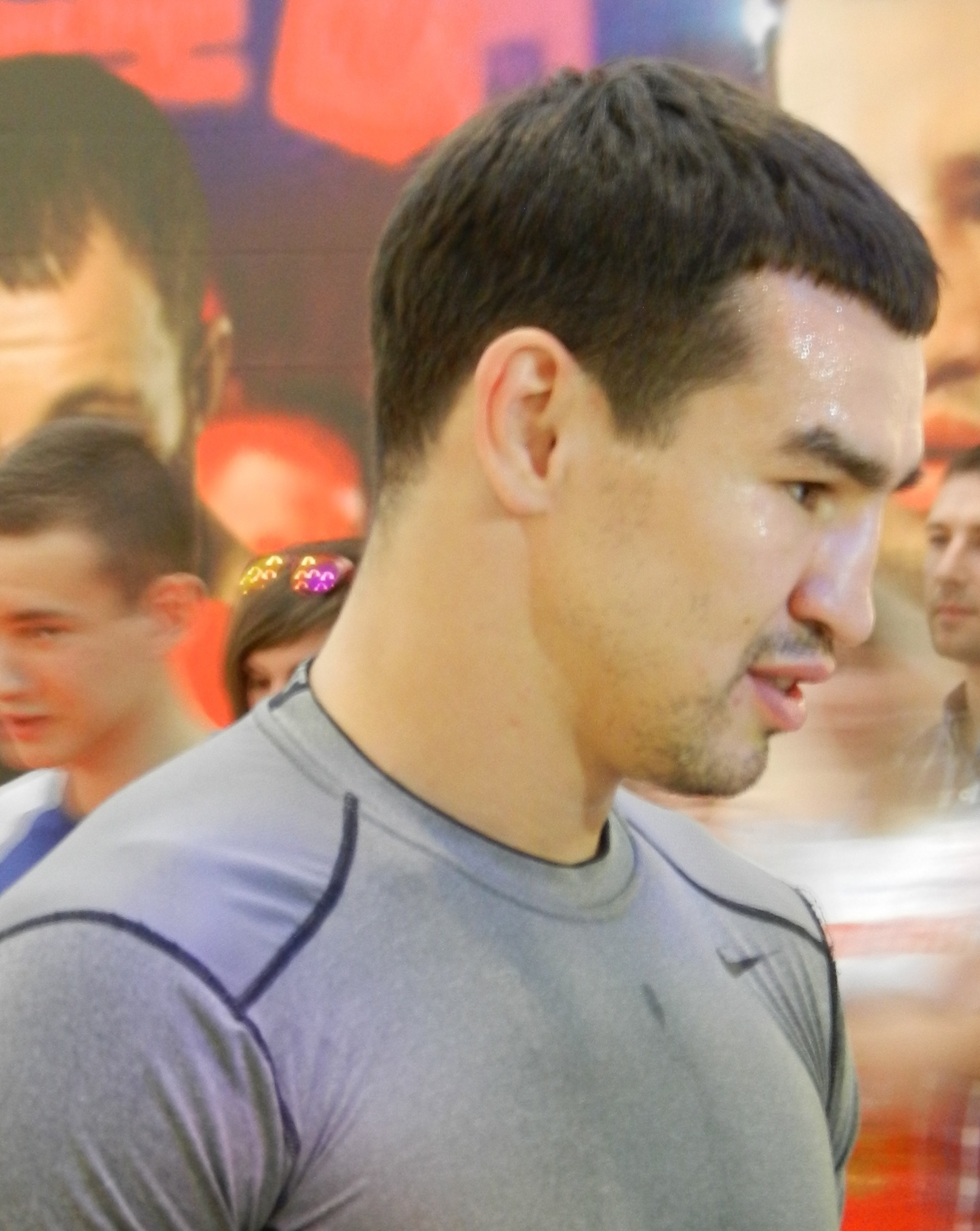
Nominee	Roman Busargin	Olga Alimova	Artem Chebotarev
Party	United Russia	CPRF	SR-ZP
Popular vote	716,974	140,198	56,606
Percentage	72.55%	14.19%	5.73%
Governor before election
Roman Busargin (acting)
United Russia
Elected Governor
Roman Busargin
United Russia

The 2022 Saratov Oblast gubernatorial election took place on 9–11 September 2022, on common election day. Acting Governor Roman Busargin was elected to a full term.

== Background ==
Valery Radaev served as Governor of Saratov Oblast since 2012, when he was confirmed in the position by Saratov Oblast Duma. Governor Radaev won his second term in 2017 election with 74.63% of the vote. In October 2021 during a dispute with Saratov Oblast Duma member Nikolai Bondarenko, Radaev made a comment that he wouldn't seek re-election in 2022. Despite Radaev's comments and other rumours about his potential departure, the governor had a powerful ally in State Duma Speaker Vyacheslav Volodin, which strengthened his position. However, on 10 May 2022 Valery Radaev asked to resign along with four other governors, Chairman of the Government of Saratov Oblast Roman Busargin was appointed acting Governor of Saratov Oblast. After his appointment, Busargin didn't resign from his previous position, instead combining the offices of Governor and Prime Minister of Saratov Oblast.

Due to the start of the Russian invasion of Ukraine in February 2022 and subsequent economic sanctions, the cancellation and postponement of direct gubernatorial elections was proposed. The measure was even supported by A Just Russia leader Sergey Mironov. Eventually, on 10 June Saratov Oblast Duma called the gubernatorial election for 11 September 2022.

== Candidates ==
Only political parties can nominate candidates for gubernatorial election in Saratov Oblast, self-nomination is not possible. However, candidates are not obliged to be members of the nominating party. Candidate for Governor of Saratov Oblast should be a Russian citizen and at least 30 years old. Each candidate in order to be registered is required to collect at least 6% of signatures of members and heads of municipalities (191–200 signatures). Also, gubernatorial candidates present three candidacies to the Federation Council and election winner later appoints one of the presented candidates.

=== Registered ===
- Olga Alimova (CPRF), Member of State Duma, 2017 gubernatorial candidate
- Roman Busargin (United Russia), acting Governor of Saratov Oblast, Chairman of the Government of Saratov Oblast
- Artem Chebotarev (SR-ZP), Member of Saratov City Duma, professional boxer
- Dmitry Pyanykh (LDPR), former Member of State Duma (2020–2021)
- Aleksandr Vantsov (Rodina), attorney, former Member of Saratov City Duma (2007–2020)

=== Failed to qualify ===
- Igor Kalganov (PVR), businessman

=== Eliminated at convention ===
- Aleksey Sidorov (United Russia), Member of Saratov City Duma, businessman

=== Declined ===
- Aleksandr Anidalov (CPRF), Member of Saratov Oblast Duma
- Nikolai Bondarenko (CPRF), former Member of Saratov Oblast Duma (2017–2022)
- Valery Rashkin (CPRF), former Member of State Duma (1999–2022), 2000 gubernatorial candidate

=== Candidates for Federation Council ===
Incumbent Senator Sergey Arenin was not renominated.

- Olga Alimova (CPRF):
  - Aleksandr Anidalov, Member of Saratov Oblast Duma
  - Nikolay Bondarenko, former Member of Saratov Oblast Duma (2017–2020)
  - Vladimir Yesipov, Member of Saratov Oblast Duma
- Roman Busargin (United Russia):
  - Aleksey Chumachenko, Rector of Saratov State University
  - Andrey Denisov, former Ambassador of Russia to China (2013–2022)
  - Natalya Kvitchuk, chief doctor at Saratov city polyclinic No.16
- Artem Chebotarev (SR-ZP):
  - Dmitry Gormiov, businessman
  - Anton Kadukhin, Chebotarev's associate
  - Yelena Zykova
- Igor Kalganov (PVR):
  - Ruslan Irsayev, manager
  - Igor Nikitin, pensioner
  - Oleg Shkil, Member of Balakovo Council
- Dmitry Pyanykh (LDPR):
  - Nikita Grigoryevsky, Member of Saratov City Duma
  - Sergey Lityak, Member of Saratov City Duma
  - Maksim Ramikh, Member of Balakovo Council
- Aleksandr Vantsov (Rodina):
  - Sergey Demin, chairman of Rodina regional office, businessman
  - Andrey Kornev, engineer
  - Sergey Ivannikov, pensioner

== Results ==
Summary of the 9–11 September 2022 Saratov Oblast gubernatorial election results
Candidate	Party	Votes	%
Roman Busargin (incumbent)	United Russia	716,974	72.55
Olga Alimova	Communist Party	140,198	14.19
Artem Chebotarev	A Just Russia — For Truth	56,606	5.73
Dmitry Pyanykh	Liberal Democratic Party	44,617	4.52
Aleksandr Vantsov	Rodina	20,756	2.10
Valid votes		979,151	99.08
Blank ballots		9,033	0.91
Total		988,194	100.00
Turnout		988,194	53.71
Registered voters		1,839,804	100.00

Former Ambassador to China Andrey Denisov (Independent) was appointed to the Federation Council, replacing incumbent Senator Sergey Arenin (Independent).

== See also ==
- 2022 Russian gubernatorial elections
