= Nikolai Bondarenko =

Russian politician (born 1985)

- Николай Бондаренко
- Bondarenko in 2020

Member of the Saratov Oblast Duma
- In office 10 September 2017 – 28 February 2022

Member of the Saratov City Duma
- In office March 2011 – September 2016

Personal details
- Born: 3 June 1985 (age 41) Saratov, Russian SFSR, Soviet Union
- Party: Communist Party of the Russian Federation
- Education: Saratov State Academy of Law
- Website: bondarenkoblog.ru

YouTube information
- Channel: Дневник Депутата
- Subscribers: 2.11 million
- Views: 145.7 million
- Last updated: 4 September 2026

Nikolai Nikolayevich Bondarenko (Russian: Николай Николаевич Бондаренко; born 3 June 1985) is a Russian opposition politician and blogger. He served as a deputy of the Saratov Oblast Duma from 2017 until his expulsion in 2022. A member of the Communist Party, he was a candidate at the 2021 Russian legislative election.

Bondarenko was previously a deputy of the Saratov City Duma from 2011 to 2016, and he is well known for his confrontational nature and criticism of the ruling United Russia party.

== Early life ==
Nikolai Bondarenko was born in Saratov on 3 June 1985. After finishing school, he attended the Saratov State Academy of Law and graduated in 2007.

== Career ==
In 2011, Bondarenko was elected to the Saratov City Duma through party lists, despite losing in his constituency. In 2017, he was elected to the Saratov Oblast Duma as a member of the Communist Party.

In 2018, Bondarenko became known for his harsh criticism of the government in regards to the pension reform and supported the protests against the reform. In October, he was detained after attending a protest in Saratov. Bondarenko also staged an experiment trying to survive on the monthly pension of 3,500 rubles and called it "genocide". In 2020, Bondarenko was put forward as a candidate for post of representative to the Federation Council from the Saratov Oblast Duma (In Russia, half of the Senators are elected by the regional parliaments, of the subjects which they represent).

On 8 February 2021, Bondarenko was detained on charges of violating protest rules. His colleagues said he attended the protests in support of Alexei Navalny on 31 January as an observer. Olga Alimova, the Saratov regional branch leader of the Communist Party, linked Bondarenko's detention with his stated plans to run for the State Duma elections later in the year, where he would compete with State Duma speaker Vyacheslav Volodin and is considered a strong challenger. The leader of the Communist Party, Gennady Zyuganov, said he would defend him in court and fight for his release. A commission of the Saratov Oblast Duma also accused Bondarenko of corruption for receiving advertising revenues and donations through his YouTube channel. In response, he called the accusation "absurd" and politically motivated. The Saratov Oblast Duma, by a majority vote, adopted a draft resolution declaring that Bondarenko violated the law. A court also fined him 20,000 rubles, which he appealed.

In 2021, Bondarenko announced that he is running for the State Duma from the Balashov constituency in the 2021 election. However, there have been rumors that the Central Election Commission may ban Bondarenko from running. Indeed, he was investigated for “extremist” association, though the matter was ultimately dismissed in court. Bondarenko lost the election to the United Russia candidate by a significant margin.

In February 2022, Bondarenko was impeached from the Saratov Oblast Duma by a vote from other deputies on the grounds of improperly declaring donations to his YouTube channel. He argued that the expulsion was politically motivated, and his fellow Communist deputies walked out of the session in protest.

Bondarenko unsuccessfully ran for his old seat (4th constituency) in the 2022 Saratov Oblast Duma election in September.

Both the 2021 and 2022 elections were marred with allegations of voter fraud, including due to the novel use of electronic voting, the results of which tend to favor the ruling party by a significant margin.

== Electoral history ==
2017 Saratov Oblast Duma election (4th Constituency)
Candidate	Party	Votes	%
Nikolai Bondarenko	CPRF	8424	24.25%
Viktoriya Alekseyeva	A Just Russia	8366	24.08%
Yekaterina Melnikova	LDPR	6849	19.71%
Sergei Burkhanov		5630	16.21%
Andrei Mayorov	Communists of Russia	5472	15.75%

2020 election of the representative to the Federation Council from the Saratov Oblast Duma
Candidate	Party	Votes
Oleg Alekseyev	United Russia	25
Nikolai Bondarenko	CPRF	6
Stanislav Denisenko	LDPR	2

2021 Russian legislative election (Balashov constituency)
Candidate	Party	Votes	%
Andrey Vorobiev	United Russia	121,326	52.50%
Nikolai Bondarenko	CPRF	67,352	29.14%
Dmitry Arkhipov	Communists of Russia	7,861	3.40%
Oleg Meshcheryakov	LDPR	6,851	2.96%
Sergey Gromyko	Party of Pensioners	6,382	2.76%
Aleksandr Fedorchenko	A Just Russia	6,364	2.75%
Vladimir Morozov	New People	4,409	1.91%
Sergey Demin	Rodina	2,604	1.13%
Ilya Kozlyakov	Yabloko	1,404	0.61%
Total		231,098	100%
