= Dmitry Ayatskov =

Russian politician (born 1950)

- Дмитрий Аяцков
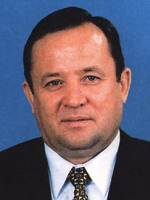

2nd Governor of Saratov Oblast
- In office 15 April 1996 – 2 April 2005
- Preceded by: Yury Belykh
- Succeeded by: Pavel Ipatov

Personal details
- Born: 9 November 1950 (age 75) Kalinino (now Stolypino), Baltaysky District, Saratov Oblast, RSFSR, Soviet Union
- Education: Saratov State Agrarian University
- Awards

Dmitry Fyodorovich Ayatskov (Russian: Дми́трий Фёдорович Ая́цков; born 9 November 1950) is a Russian politician. He was the Russian head of administration in 1996 and the Governor of the Saratov Oblast from 1996 to 2005.

In 2005, after the abolition of elections of regional leaders, President Putin did not propose the candidature of Dmitry Ayatskov to override the governor of the region. Instead, in March 2005 Ayatskov was appointed Russian ambassador to Belarus. However, on 19 July 2005 at a press conference in Saratov, which he gave after the receipt of agreement, that is an official agreement on the visit to Minsk as an ambassador, Ayatskov offered Belarusian President Alexander Lukashenko "stop blowing cheeks". These words caused a scandal, and the appointment did not take place.

In autumn 2005 there was information that Dmitry Ayatskov will take the post of the President of Russia envoy assistant of Volga Federal District. In early 2006, Ayatskov opened in Saratov public reception and started writing his memoirs.

In the autumn of 2006 he was appointed assistant Kremlin Chief of Staff.

On 24 March 2014 he was appointed advisor to the unit counselors and assistants of the Governor of the Saratov region Valery Radaev on Agrarian Issues.
