= SSAU =

SSAU may refer to:

- Samara State Aerospace University, a Russian engineering and technical institution
- State Space Agency of Ukraine
- Saratov State Agrarian University, an agricultural higher education institution in the Volga region
- Stavropol State Agrarian University.
