= Pavel Ipatov (politician) =

Russian politician (born 1950)

- Павел Ипатов
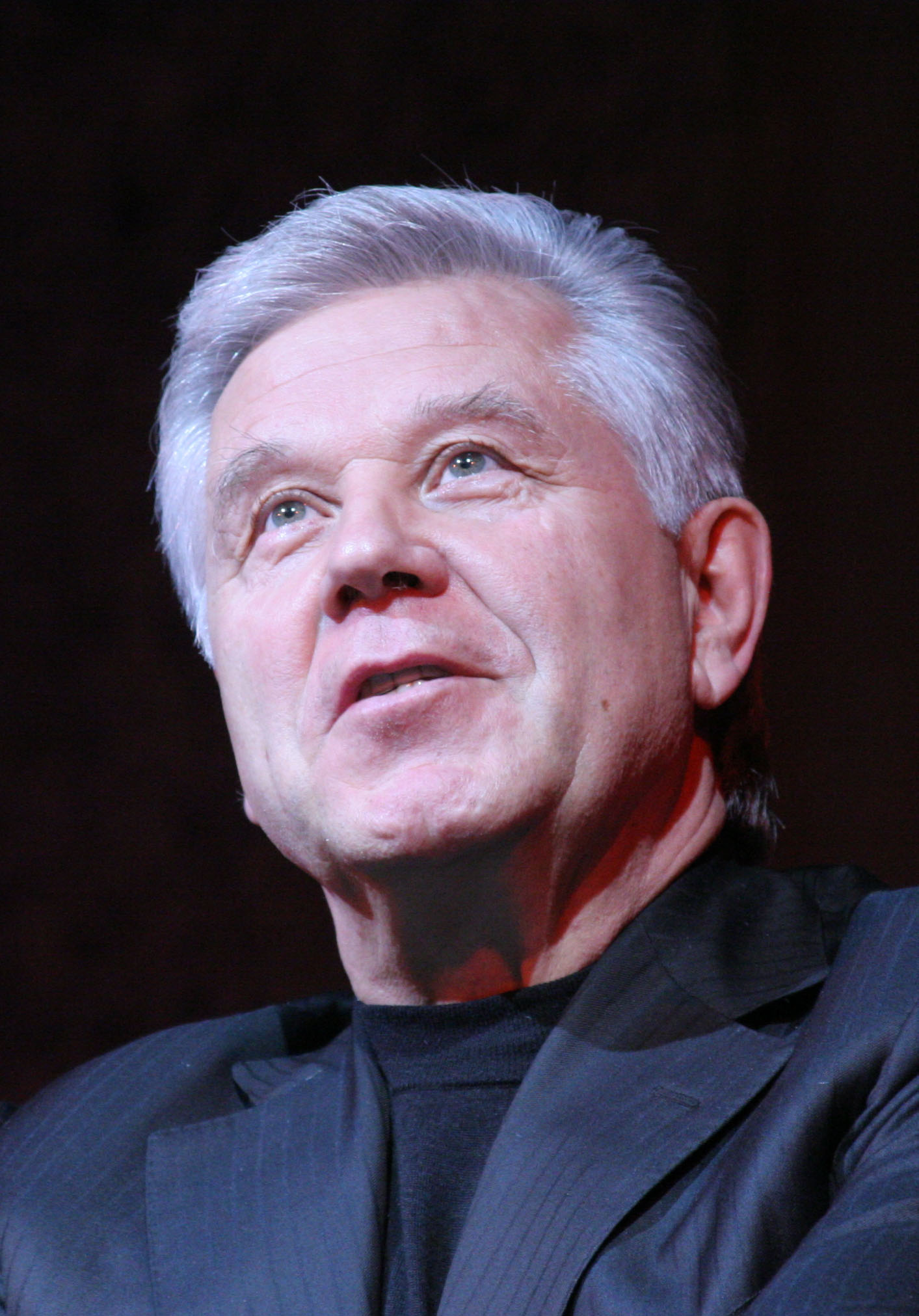
- Ipatov in 2011

2nd Governor of Saratov Oblast
- In office 5 April 2005 – 23 March 2012
- Preceded by: Dmitry Ayatskov
- Succeeded by: Valery Radayev

Personal details
- Born: Pavel Leonidovich Ipatov; April 12, 1950 (age 75) Asbestovsky, Sverdlovsk Oblast, RSFSR, Soviet Union
- Party: United Russia
- Profession: Nuclear physicist

Pavel Leonidovich Ipatov (Russian: Па́вел Леони́дович Ипа́тов; born 12 April 1950) is a Russian politician who served as Governor of Saratov Oblast from 2005 until 23 March 2012. He was the first governor appointed by president Vladimir Putin. Ipatov is a member of United Russia. He was previously the director of a nuclear power plant.

== Career ==
Ipatov was born in the village of Asbestovsky in Sverdlovsk Oblast and studied at the Urals Political College in Sverdlovsk. In 1975 he graduated from the Ural State Technical University with a degree in electrical engineering and joined the power generation industry. During the 1980s he was manager at the South Ukraine Nuclear Power Plant and became chief engineer at the Balakovo Nuclear Power Plant in 1985 and managing director of this plant in 1989. He became deputy managing director of Energoatom in 2002.

He was a deputy of the Balakovo city council from 1996 to 2004, before being appointed governor of Saratov Oblast in 2005.

On 23 March 2012, he resigned from the post according to the Decree of the President of the Russian Federation to be replaced by Valery Radayev. The wording in the Decree was “resignation according to his own will”.

== Awards ==
- Order of the Red Banner of Labour (1988)
- Prize of the Council of Ministers of the Soviet Union (1991)
- Order of Friendship of Peoples (1994)
- Order of Honour (2000)
