= 2022 North Ossetia–Alania parliamentary election =

- 10–11 September 2022
- Turnout: 68.97%
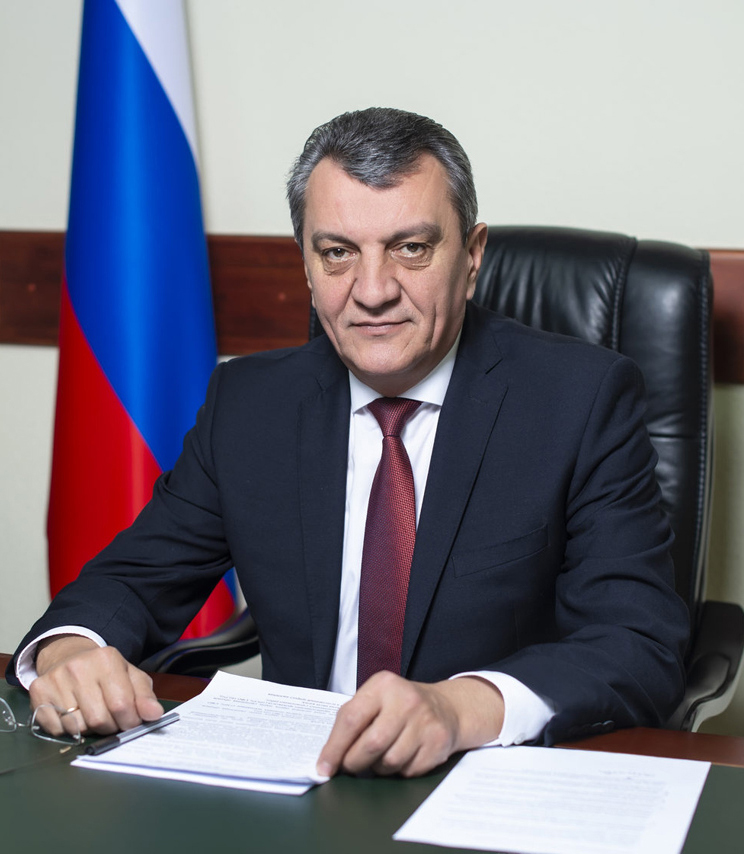

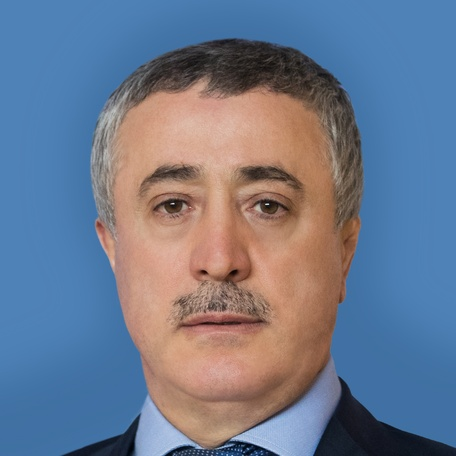
| | Majority party | Minority party | Third party |
|---|---|---|---|
| | | | CPRF |
| Candidate | Sergey Menyaylo | Arsen Fadzaev | Yelena Knyazeva |
| Leader | Dmitry Medvedev | Sergey Mironov | Gennady Zyuganov |
| Party | United Russia | SR-ZP | CPRF |
| Last election | 46 seats, 59.19% | 5 seats, 10.22% | 5 seats, 6.59% |
| Seats won | 51 | 10 | 9 |
| Seat change | ▲5 | ▲5 | ▲4 |
| Popular vote | 242,091 | 50,878 | 44,055 |
| Percentage | 67.88% | 14.27% | 12.35% |
| Swing | ▲8.69% | ▲4.05% | ▲5.76% |
| | Fourth party | Fifth party |
| | Rodina | LDPR |
| Candidate | Taymuraz Fidarov | Soslan Bestayev |
| Leader | Aleksey Zhuravlyov | Leonid Slutsky |
| Party | Rodina | LDPR |
| Last election | 0 seats, 3.31% | 0 seats, 2.13% |
| Seats won | 0 | 0 |
| Seat change | 0 | 0 |
| Popular vote | 8,064 | 5,597 |
| Percentage | 2.26% | 1.57% |
| Swing | ▼1.05% | ▼0.56% |

The 2022 Parliament of the Republic of North Ossetia–Alania election took place on 10–11 September 2022, on common election day. All 70 seats in the Parliament were up for reelection.

== Electoral system ==
Under current election laws, the Parliament is elected for a term of five years by party-list proportional representation with a 5% electoral threshold. Seats are allocated using the Imperiali quota, modified to ensure that every party list, which passes the threshold, receives at least 1 mandate ("Tyumen method"). Unlike most regional elections in Russia, party lists in North Ossetia are not divided between territorial groups.

== Candidates ==
To register regional lists of candidates, parties need to collect 0.5% of signatures of all registered voters in North Ossetia.

The following parties were relieved from the necessity to collect signatures:

- United Russia
- Communist Party of the Russian Federation
- A Just Russia — Patriots — For Truth
- Liberal Democratic Party of Russia
- New People
- Rodina
- Communists of Russia

| № | Party | Party-list leaders | Candidates | Status |
|---|---|---|---|---|
| 1 | Rodina | Taymuraz Fidarov • Khetag Gazyumov • Inna Rodina | 76 | Registered |
| 2 | Communist Party | Yelena Knyazeva • Aslanbek Gutnov • Medeya Eldzarova | 69 | Registered |
| 3 | United Russia | Sergey Menyaylo • Vladimir Guriyev • Zurab Makiev | 74 | Registered |
| 4 | Liberal Democratic Party | Soslan Bestayev • Stanislav Dzeboyev • Kazbek Badov | 80 | Registered |
| 5 | A Just Russia — For Truth | Arsen Fadzaev • Svetlana Doyeva • Soslan Didarov | 87 | Registered |
| | Party of Business | Artur Khadzaragov • Larisa Dzakhova • Ruslan Khadartsev | 69 | Failed to qualify |
| | New People | Khadzhimurat Gatsalov • Margarita Kulova • David Gazzati | | Failed the certification |
| | Communists of Russia | | | Failed the certification |

Several parties, who participated in the 2017 election, are absent from the ballot: Party of Growth did not file, while Patriots of Russia and Green Alliance had been dissolved prior.

== Results ==
Summary of the 10–11 September 2022 Parliament of the Republic of North Ossetia — Alania election results
| Party | Votes | % | ±pp | Seats | +/– |
|---|---|---|---|---|---|
| United Russia | 242,091 | 67.88 | ▲8.69% | 51 | ▲5 |
| A Just Russia — For Truth | 50,878 | 14.27 | ▲4.05% | 10 | ▲5 |
| Communist Party | 44,055 | 12.35 | ▲5.76% | 9 | ▲4 |
| Rodina | 8,064 | 2.26 | ▼1.05% | 0 | Steady |
| Liberal Democratic Party | 5,597 | 1.57 | ▼0.56% | 0 | Steady |
| Invalid ballots | 5,953 | 1.67 | ▲0.16% | — | — |
| Total | 356,643 | 100.00 | — | 70 | Steady |
| Turnout | 356,643 | 68.97 | ▲10.00% | — | — |
| Registered voters | 517,087 | 100.00 | — | — | — |

United Russia faction head Vitaly Nazarenko was appointed to the Federation Council, replacing incumbent Arsen Fadzaev (A Just Russia).

== See also ==
- 2022 Russian regional elections
