= Asbestovsky =

Asbestovsky (masculine), Asbestovskaya (feminine), or Asbestovskoye (neuter) may refer to:

- Asbestovsky Urban Okrug, a municipal formation in Sverdlovsk Oblast, Russia, which the town of Asbest is incorporated as
- Asbestovsky (rural locality), a rural locality (a settlement) in Sverdlovsk Oblast, Russia
