= 2022 Russian regional elections =

← 2021	11 September 2022	2023 →
- 2022 Russian regional elections: Gubernatorial Legislative Gubernatorial and legislative

The 2022 Russian regional elections took place in Russia on 11 September 2022.

== Gubernatorial ==
- 2022 Adygea head election
- 2022 Buryatia head election
- 2022 Karelia head election
- 2022 Mari El head election
- 2022 Udmurtia head election
- 2022 Kaliningrad Oblast gubernatorial election
- 2022 Kirov Oblast gubernatorial election
- 2022 Novgorod Oblast gubernatorial election
- 2022 Ryazan Oblast gubernatorial election
- 2022 Saratov Oblast gubernatorial election
- 2022 Sverdlovsk Oblast gubernatorial election
- 2022 Tambov Oblast gubernatorial election
- 2022 Tomsk Oblast gubernatorial election
- 2022 Vladimir Oblast gubernatorial election
- 2022 Yaroslavl Oblast gubernatorial election

== Legislative ==
Legislature	Seats	Voting system	Majority in last election		Majority after election		Change
Parliament of North Ossetia–Alania	70	Party-list proportional representation	United Russia	46 / 70	United Russia	51 / 70	▲5
State Council of Udmurtia	60	Parallel (20 party list + 40 SMC)	United Russia	47 / 60	United Russia	49 / 60	▲2
Legislative Assembly of Krasnodar Krai	70	Parallel (25 party list + 45 SMC)	United Russia	60 / 70	United Russia	62 / 70	▲2
Legislative Assembly of Penza Oblast	36	Parallel (18 party list + 18 SMC)	United Russia	32 / 36	United Russia	32 / 36	0
Saratov Oblast Duma	40	Parallel (10 party list + 30 SMC)	United Russia	36 / 45	United Russia	29 / 40	▼7
Sakhalin Oblast Duma	28	Parallel (10 party list + 18 SMC)	United Russia	19 / 28	United Russia	22 / 28	▲3

== See also ==
- 2022 Moscow municipal elections
- 2022 Russian-occupied Ukraine annexation referendums
