= Arsen Fadzaev =

Soviet wrestler (born 1962)

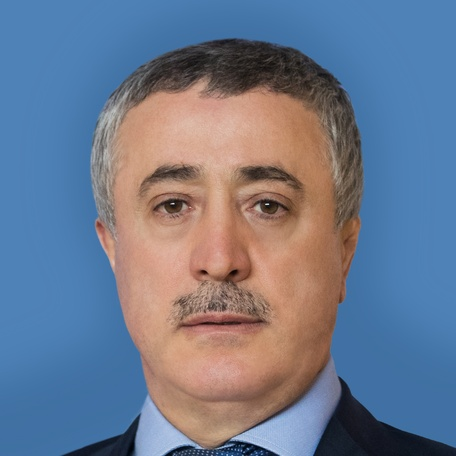

Personal information
- Nationality: Russian/Uzbekistani
- Born: 15 September 1962 (age 63)

Sport
- Sport: Wrestling
- Club: Trudovye Rezervy Termez; CSKA Tashkent
Medal record
Men's freestyle wrestling
Olympic Games
Representing Soviet Union
Gold medal – first place	1988 Seoul	Lightweight
Representing Unified Team
Gold medal – first place	1992 Barcelona	Lightweight
Representing Soviet Union
World Championships
Gold medal – first place	1983 Kiev	68 kg
Gold medal – first place	1985 Budapest	68 kg
Gold medal – first place	1986 Budapest	68 kg
Gold medal – first place	1987 Clermont-Ferrand	68 kg
Gold medal – first place	1990 Tokyo	68 kg
Gold medal – first place	1991 Varna	68 kg
Silver medal – second place	1989 Martigny	74 kg

Arsen Suleymanovich Fadzaev (Russian: Арсен Сулейманович Фадзаев, Iron Ossetic: Фадзайти Сулемани фурт Арсен; born 5 September 1962, in Chikola, North Ossetia–Alania, Russian SFSR, Soviet Union) is a former Soviet wrestler, World champion and Olympic champion in freestyle wrestling. He also ran as a candidate for SRZP in the 2022 North Ossetia–Alania parliamentary election.

== Biography ==
=== Political career ===
On December 7, 2003, he was elected a deputy to the 4th State Duma in the North Ossetian single-mandate constituency from the Union of Right Forces, but after his election he joined the United Russia. He was deputy chairman of the Committee on Physical Culture, Sports and Youth Affairs, and a member of the commission on the problems of the North Caucasus.

On December 2, 2007, he was elected to the 5th State Duma on the federal list of the United Russia party. He served as Deputy Chairman of the Committee on CIS Affairs and Relations with Compatriots.

Advocates the recognition of South Ossetia's independence. He created the public organization For the Health of the Nation.

In the December 2011 6th State Duma elections, Fadzaev was not included in the United Russia list from North Ossetia. In August, he joined the Patriots of Russia. In October 2012, in the elections to the legislative assembly of the North Ossetia, Patriots of Russia with Fadzaev at the head of the list won 26.5% of the votes.

Head of the Patriots of Russia faction in the Parliament of North Ossetia-Alania. Deputy of the Parliament of the Republic of North Ossetia-Alania of the fifth convocation, member of the Committee on Social Policy, Healthcare and Veterans' Affairs.

On September 22, 2017, at the suggestion of the United Russia and Patriots of Russia factions, he was elected to represent the legislature of North Ossetia-Alania in the Federation Council.

=== Olympics ===
Fadzaev competed at the 1988 Summer Olympics in Seoul where he received his first Olympic gold medal in freestyle wrestling. He won another gold medal at the 1992 Summer Olympics in Barcelona. He competed for Uzbekistan at the 1996 Summer Olympics in Atlanta, where he finished 13th.

=== Sanctions ===
He was sanctioned by the UK government in 2022 in relation to the Russo-Ukrainian War.

== Awards and honours ==
- Order of the Badge of Honour (1985)
- Order of Friendship of Peoples (1988)
- Order of the Red Banner of Labour (1989)
- Order of Alexander Nevsky (2020)
- Honored Master of Sports of the USSR (1983)
- Winner of the Golden Wrestling FILA prize (1986)
- Honorary Citizen of Tashkent
