= Roman Busargin =

Russian politician (born 1981)

- Роман Бусаргин
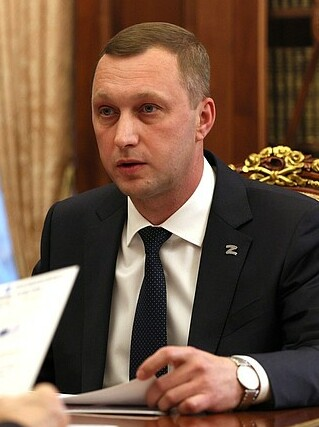
- Busargin in 2023

Governor of Saratov Oblast
- Incumbent
- Assumed office 16 September 2022
- Preceded by: Valery Radayev

Personal details
- Born: 29 July 1981 (age 45) Krasnopartizansky District, Saratov Oblast, USSR
- Party: United Russia
- Education: Saratov State Agrarian University

Roman Viktorovich Busargin (Russian: Роман Викторович Бусаргин; born 29 July 1981) is a Russian politician serving as the Governor of Saratov Oblast since 16 September 2022. He succeeded Valery Radayev.

== Career ==
In 2003 he graduated from the Saratov State Agrarian University named after Nikolai Vavilov. He is PhD candidate in Sociology. From 2005 to 2008 he worked in the Administration of the Saratovsky District. From 2008 to 2009 he served as First Deputy Head of the Administration of the Saratovsky District. From 2009 to 2011 he served as Deputy Head of the Administration of the Privolzhsky urban locality in the Engelssky District. In January 2011, he was appointed Deputy Head of the Engels city Administration.

From 2013 to 2018 he served as Chairman of the Committee for Housing and Public Utilities, Fuel and Energy Complex, Transport and Communications of the Administration of the Engelssky District. At the beginning of 2018, he acted as Chairman of the Committee for Housing and Communal services of the Saratov city Administration. From March to October 2018 he served as Deputy Head of the Saratov city Administration for Urban Affairs. In October 2018, he was appointed to the position of Deputy Chairman of the Saratov Oblast Government.

In October 2020, Busargin became Vice-governor and headed the Government of Saratov Oblast.

On 10 May 2022, Russian President Vladimir Putin signed a decree appointing Roman Busargin as acting governor of Saratov Oblast.

On 16 September 2022, he officially took office as Governor of Saratov Oblast.

=== Sanctions ===
He was sanctioned by the UK government in 2022 in relation to the Russo-Ukrainian War.

== Family ==
He is married and has two children.
