= Vyacheslav Volodin =

Russian politician (born 1964)

- Вячеслав Володин
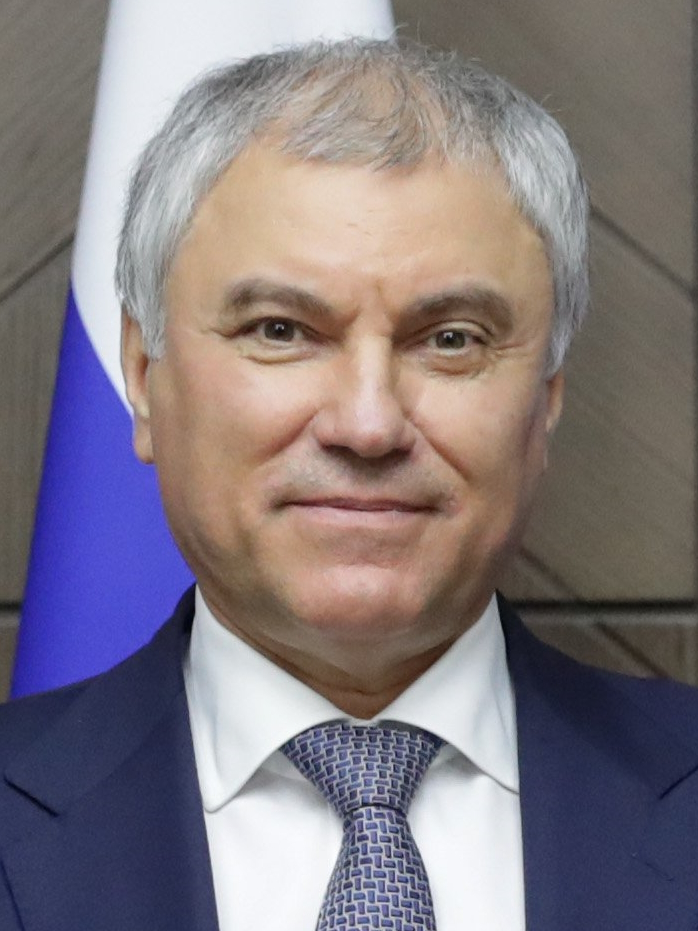
- Volodin in 2024

Chairman of the State Duma
- Incumbent
- Assumed office 5 October 2016
- Preceded by: Sergey Naryshkin

Member of the State Duma for Saratov Oblast
- Incumbent
- Assumed office 12 October 2021
- Preceded by: Olga Alimova
- Constituency: Saratov (No. 163)

Member of the State Duma (Party List Seat)
- In office 5 October 2016 – 12 October 2021

First Deputy Chief of Staff of the Presidential Administration of Russia
- In office 27 December 2011 – 5 October 2016
- Preceded by: Vladislav Surkov
- Succeeded by: Sergey Kiriyenko

Deputy Prime Minister of Russia — Head of the Government Executive Office
- In office 21 October 2010 – 27 December 2011
- Preceded by: Sergey Sobyanin
- Succeeded by: Anton Vaino

Member of the State Duma (Party List Seat)
- In office 24 December 2007 – 21 December 2011

Member of the State Duma for Saratov Oblast
- In office 29 December 2003 – 24 December 2007
- Preceded by: Nikolay Sukhoy
- Succeeded by: Constituencies abolished
- Constituency: Balakovo (No. 156)

Parliamentary leader of Fatherland – All Russia
- In office 2001–2003
- Preceded by: Yevgeny Primakov
- Succeeded by: Boris Gryzlov (as Parliamentary leader of United Russia)

Member of the State Duma (Party List Seat)
- In office 18 January 2000 – 29 December 2003

Personal details
- Born: 4 February 1964 (age 62) Alekseyevka, Saratov Oblast, Soviet Union
- Party: United Russia
- Other political affiliations: Fatherland – All Russia
- Education: Saratov State Agrarian University; Russian Presidential Academy of National Economy and Public Administration
- Profession: Lawyer
- Website: vvolodin.ru (former)
- Vyacheslav Volodin's voice Recorded 19 September 2023

Vyacheslav Viktorovich Volodin (Russian: Вячеслав Викторович Володин, IPA: [vʲɪtɕɪsˈlaf ˈvʲiktərəvʲɪtɕ vɐˈlodʲin]; born 4 February 1964) is a Russian politician who serves as the 10th Chairman of the State Duma since 2016. He is a former aide to President Vladimir Putin.

The former Secretary-General of the United Russia party, he was a deputy in the State Duma from 1999 until 2011 and from 2016 to present day. From 2010 until 2012, he was Deputy Prime Minister of Russia. He is also a former first deputy Chief of Staff of the Presidential Administration of Russia. He has the federal state civilian service rank of 1st class Active State Councillor of the Russian Federation. Volodin engineered Putin's conservative turn in his third term and is considered part of his inner circle.

== Early life and education ==
Volodin was born 4 February 1964 in the village of Alekseyevka, Khvalynsky District, Saratov Oblast, in a large family. His father was the captain of the river fleet; he died at the age of 51 in 1969. After the death of his father, he was brought up by his stepfather. His sister is an employee of a consulting firm, and his brother is a military pensioner. All of them, according to Volodin himself, live in the Saratov Oblast. His mother graduated from the Saratov Pedagogical College. After completing her studies, she refused a job assignment to Leningrad and remained in her native region, because she did not want to leave her elderly mother alone. She worked as a primary school teacher in a rural school.

Volodin graduated in mechanical engineering from the faculty of organization and technology of the Saratov State Agrarian University in 1986, and then obtained a Doctor of Law from the Russian Academy of State Service under the President of the Russian Federation in 1995. He obtained a PhD in law from the St. Petersburg University of the Russian Interior Ministry in 1996 with a thesis titled A Russian Constituent Entity: Problems of Power, Law-making and Administration (Russian: Субъект Российской Федерации: проблемы власти, законотворчества и управления, romanized: Subyekt Rossiyskoy Federatsii: problemy vlasti, zakonotvorchestva i upravleniya, lit. 'Subject of the Russian Federation: problems of power, lawmaking and governance'). He worked as a lecturer and assistant professor while he studied in St. Petersburg.

== Business interests ==
Since 2 August 2009 through the cooperative "Sosny" (Russian: ДНП «Сосны»), Volodin is a business partner of Sergey Neverov (Russian: Сергей Неверов), who was the Deputy Chairman of the State Duma and United Russia, Igor Rudensky (Russian: Игорь Руденский), who was a member of the Presidium of the General Council of United Russia, Sergei Prikhodko, who was a Deputy Prime Minister, Konstantin Kosachev (Russian: Константин Косачев), who was the head of the Duma Committee on International Affairs at that time, Yu.V. Pervova (Russian: Ю.В. Первова) and Nikolay Ashlapov (Russian: Николай Аншлапов), who was later the Head of the Federal Agency for Special Construction. "Sosny" purchased land from the Nadezhda Ivanovna Makeeva associated Bolshoy Gorod LLC (Russian: ООО «Большой Город»). Makeeva's husband is the chairman of the board of NMC "Itera" Vladimir Pavlovich Makeev (Russian: НГК «Итера» Владимир Павлович Макеев) who is a close associate of the president of Itera Igor Makarov.

Uncovered by Anonymous International and made public in June 2014, Volodin is a strong supporter of the interests of Yevgeny Prigozhin and the trolls at the Internet Research Agency.

== Political career ==
=== Regional politics ===
In 1990, he was elected as a member of the Saratov City Duma. Since 1992, Volodin was the Deputy of the Head of Administration of Saratov, since 1994 deputy chairman of the Saratov Oblast Duma and in 1996 he was appointed to the Vice Governor of the Saratov region.

=== Deputy Chairman of the Duma (1999–2010) ===
In the Russian legislative election in 1999, he was a candidate of the political bloc Fatherland – All Russia. After being elected Volodin became deputy chairman of the third State Duma, and from September 2001 he was the head of the Fatherland – All Russia.

In 2003, he ran for a seat in the fourth State Duma and was elected as a Deputy from the Balakovo constituency, Saratov Oblast. In the fourth State Duma he was deputy chairman again and appointed first deputy head of the fraction of the ruling party United Russia which has been founded in 2001. Since 2005 he was the party's Secretary-General of its Council Presidium.

In 2007, he was elected to the Russian State Duma in its fifth session. Until October 2010, he was once more Chairman of the State Duma.

=== Deputy Chairman of Government (2010–2012) ===
On 21 October 2010, he was appointed Deputy Prime Minister under Dmitry Medvedev. as well as—after the dismissal of Sergey Sobyanin in connection with his approval to the Mayor of Moscow—Chief of Staff of the Presidential Executive Office.

=== First deputy Chief of Staff of the Presidential Administration of Russia (2012–2016) ===
==== Father of spy software ====
Following the mass protests against the outcomes of the 2011 Russian legislative election organized by several persons, including Alexei Navalny, who used Facebook, Twitter, and LiveJournal blogs to organize the events, Volodin, who was Deputy Prime Minister at the time and later became First Deputy Chief of Staff of the Presidential Administration of Russia and was responsible for domestic policy, was tasked with countering these efforts and began to rein in the internet using Prisma (Russian: «Призма») which "actively tracks the social media activities that result in increased social tension, disorderly conduct, protest sentiments and extremist" by monitoring in real time the protesters discussions on blogs and social networks and performs social media tracking which later led to the establishment of the Internet Research Agency. The Prisma terminals were installed in about fifty offices including the leadership of the Ministry of Internal Affairs, the Moscow mayor's office, the office of State Duma Speaker Sergei Naryshkin, the head of Rosneft Igor Sechin, etc.

Despite the fact that Volodin actively supports Vladimir Putin (for example, he says that "no Putin, no Russia"), many experts talk about his presidential ambitions. So in 2012, one of his friends in an interview with Reuters said that considers Volodin the future President, as "he has a desire to fly high". Another close to Volodin man said: "an ordinary person in the afternoon thinking about plans for the evening. Volodin does not think about plans for the evening—he has a plan for life. When he was Vice Mayor of Saratov, he already said to friends that he would become President of Russia." In addition, in 2015, the cleric Vsevolod Chaplin, commenting on the article in the Izvestia about the personal life of a number of political figures of Russia, also spoke about the presidential ambitions of Volodin.

=== Sanctions ===
On 28 April 2014, following the Crimean status referendum, the U.S. Treasury put Volodin on the Specially Designated Nationals List (SDN), a list of individuals sanctioned as "members of the Russian leadership's inner circle." The sanctions freeze any assets he holds in the US and ban him from entering the United States.

On 12 May 2014, Volodin was added to the European Union sanctions list due to his role in the annexation of Crimea by the Russian Federation. He is barred from entering countries in the EU, and his assets in the EU have been frozen. He was sanctioned by the United Kingdom government the same year.

== Chairman of the State Duma ==
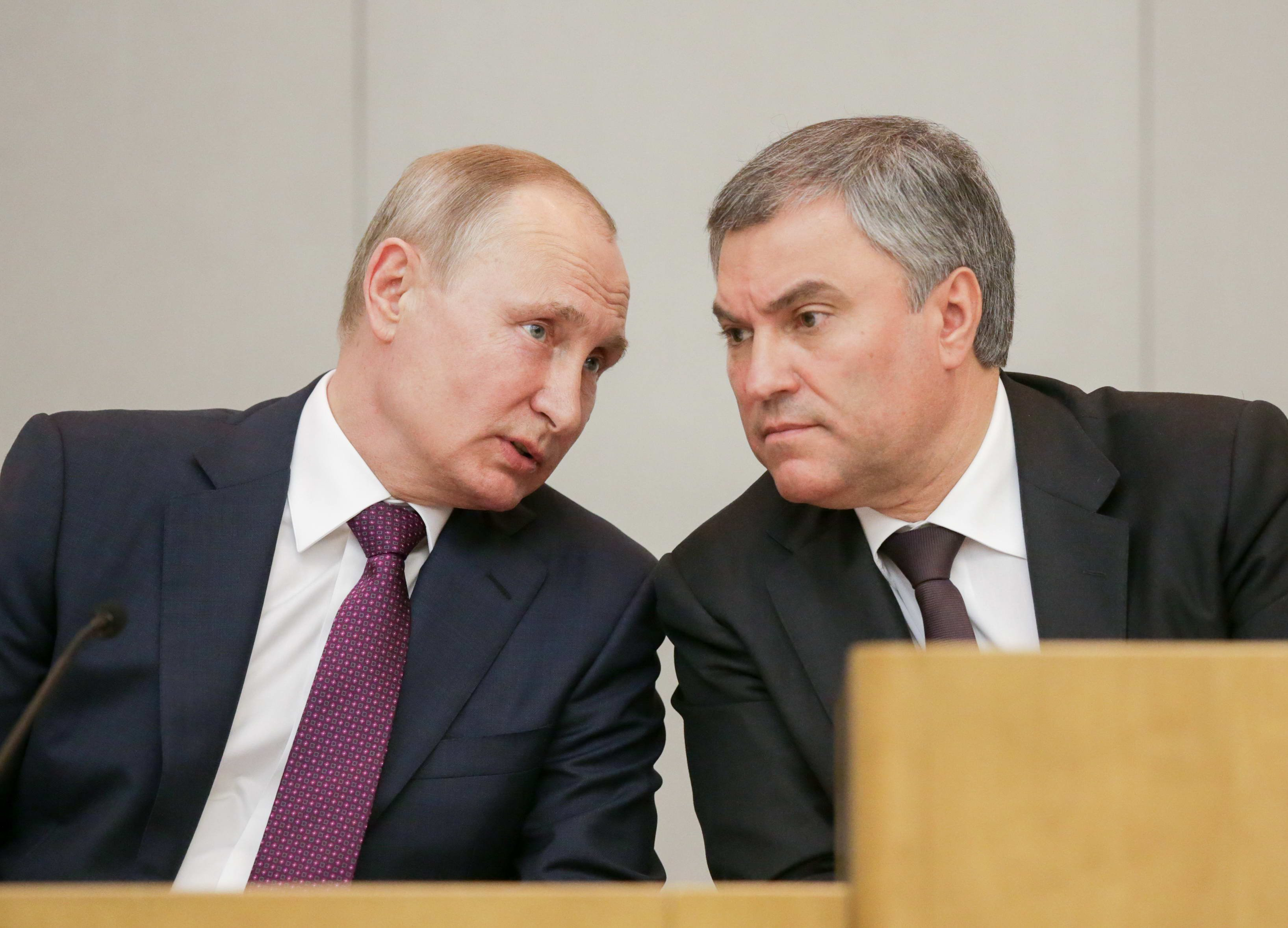
Volodin is a Putin loyalist. In 2014 he stated: "If we have Putin, we have Russia. If there's no Putin, there's no Russia."

=== Elections ===
==== 2016 ====
For the first time, rumors that Volodin could become the new Chairman of the State Duma after the 2016 legislative election were circulated before the election. However, this information was not yet confirmed.

After the 2016 legislative election, the previous Chairman of the State Duma Sergey Naryshkin was appointed Director of the Foreign Intelligence Service. On 23 September 2016, President Vladimir Putin proposed to the United Russia to nominate Volodin as Naryshkin's successor. The majority leader Vladimir Vasilyev endorsed Volodin's candidacy, alongside the faction of the Liberal Democratic Party and A Just Russia. On 5 October, Volodin was elected Chairman of the State Duma, with 404 votes. His only rival was the communist Dmitry Novikov, who received 40 votes.

==== 2021 ====
In 2021, Volodin was again nominated to the chairmanship of the 8th State Duma. His candidacy was again endorsed by the Liberal Democratic Party and A Just Russia — For Truth. Novikov from the Communist Party was again the sole opponent running against Volodin. On 12 October, Volodin was re-elected Chairman of the State Duma with a majority of 360 votes.

=== Tenure ===
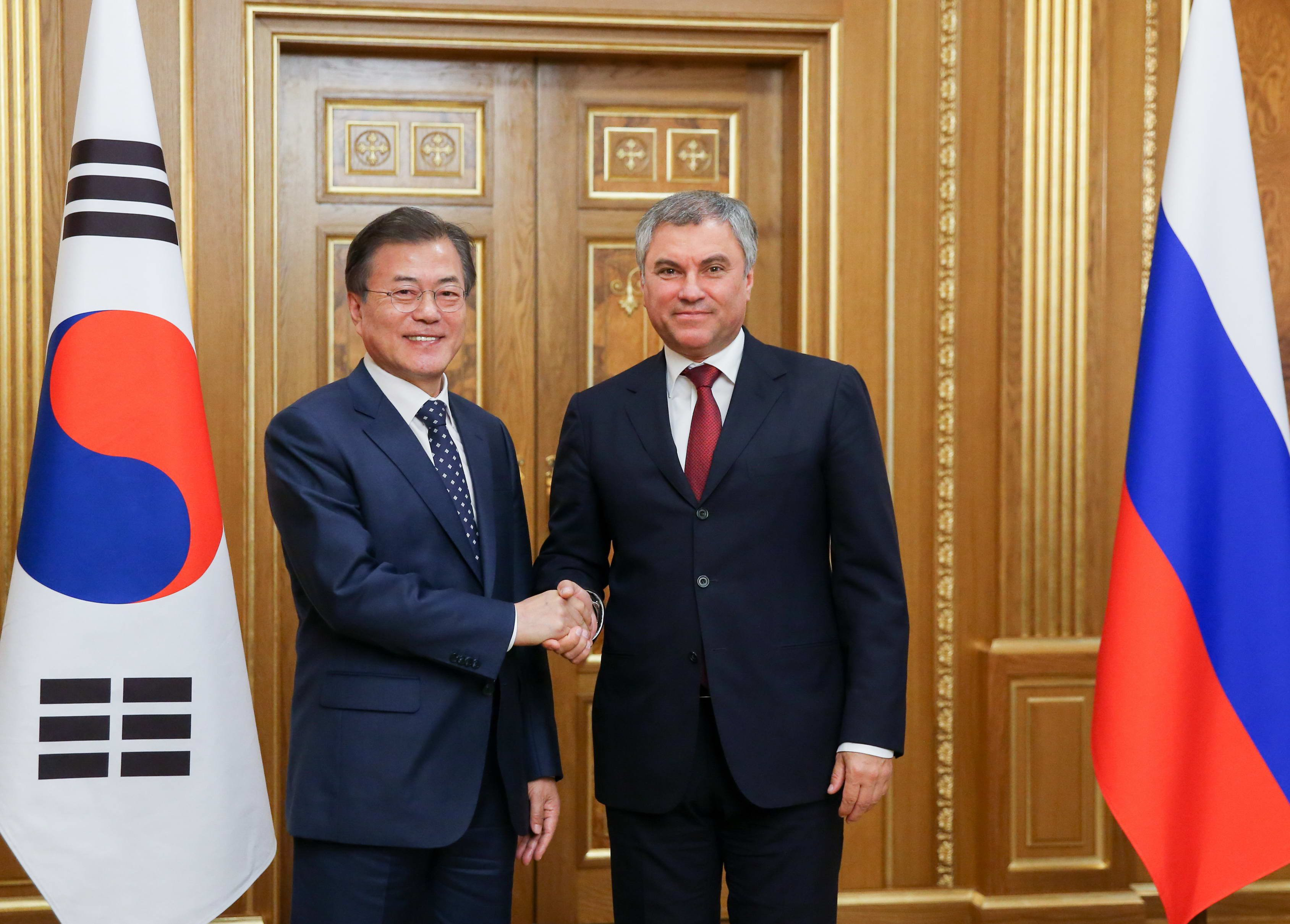
Volodin with South Korean President Moon Jae-in in the State Duma, 21 June 2018

In October 2016, he was among the three most influential politicians in Russia (after presidents Vladimir Putin and Dmitry Medvedev) by rating of the Center for Political Technologies. According to a survey conducted by the expert-analytical center of RANEPA, the level of recognition of Vyacheslav Volodin is at a high level. 83% of respondents know that he holds the post of Chairman of the State Duma. In addition, 78% of Russians have a positive or neutral view of Volodin's activities as Chairman of the State Duma.

On 24 November 2016, he was elected Chairman of the Parliamentary Assembly of the Collective Security Treaty Organization and on 26 December 2016 he was elected Chairman of the Parliamentary Assembly of the Union State.

As Chairman, Volodin actively began to deal with the discipline of deputies. At first he forbade deputies to vote by proxy for other deputies. In this connection, the deputies have to attend the meetings in person. Fines for missing meetings without a valid reason were also introduced.

On 6 March 2019, Vyacheslav Volodin, during a meeting of the State Duma, interrupted the report of the Minister of Economic Development Maxim Oreshkin and did not allow him to finish his speech. Volodin accused him of being unprepared and offered to report again in a month (usually such reports pass only once a year). According to some deputies, this case is the first in the entire post-Soviet history of Russia.

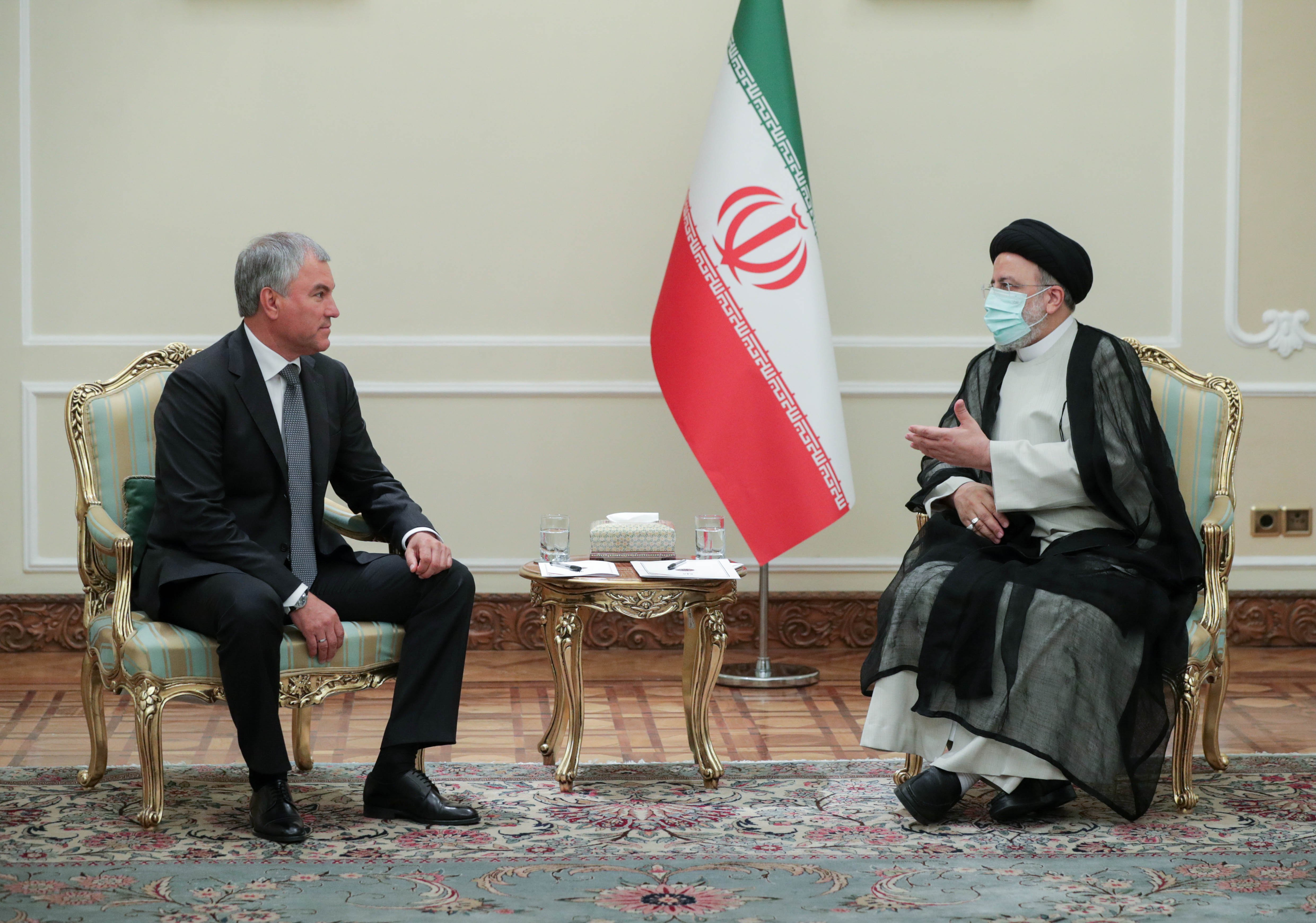
Volodin with Iranian President Ebrahim Raisi on 5 August 2021

On 6 April 2019, Volodin proposed amendments to the Constitution allowing the State Duma to participate more actively in the formation of the government. According to him, the State Duma should at least participate in consultations when appointing members of the government (currently, the participation of the State Duma in the formation of the government is limited only by the fact that it must give consent to the President to appoint the Prime Minister). Volodin said that the participation of the State Duma in the formation of the government "would be consistent with the principles of proper balance of power" and "would provide a higher level of responsibility" in the work of Ministers. In July 2019, Volodin again called for the introduction of appropriate amendments to the Constitution in his article in the Parliamentary Newspaper. Later, Volodin's proposal was supported by the leaders of all opposition parliamentary parties. In January 2020, Putin proposed introducing such amendments during his Address to the Federal Assembly.

In November 2019, Volodin said that due to Ukrainian nationalism and an alleged oppression of ethnic minorities, there was a chance that some regions may separate from Ukraine.

On 28 January 2022, Volodin promised that "Russia will not go to war against Ukraine." On 18 February 2022, he demanded that the West apologize for its "disinformation" about the Kremlin's alleged plans to invade Ukraine.

On 24 February 2022, Volodin said that "the purpose" of the Russian invasion of Ukraine is "to protect people living in Ukraine". He wrote on his Telegram that "demilitarizing Ukraine" is the "only path that will allow us to prevent war in Europe. Our only chance to stop the fighting and the humanitarian catastrophe." According to Meduza, he was one of the first Russian politicians to publicly support the invasion. He has denounced Russians who oppose the war as "traitors". On 11 March 2022, he stated that "[Ukrainian] citizens are expendable for Washington and Brussels: the war to the last Ukrainian takes hundreds of lives every day. The Kyiv regime leads Ukraine to its complete disappearance." On 5 April 2022, Volodin claimed that the massacre in the Ukrainian city of Bucha was a staged "provocation" by the West and Ukraine "aimed at discrediting Russia".

On 6 July 2022, Volodin warned that Russia could demand back the US state of Alaska, which was sold by Russia to the United States in 1867, if the United States continued to seize Russian assets abroad.

Russian citizens critical of the 2022 Russian mobilization have used social media and other electronic means (e.g. Twitter) to enquire en masse Russia's top officials and deputies, who supported war with Ukraine and mobilization, whether they themselves or their sons would go to the front. Most of them refused to answer or made excuses why it was not possible for them to go to war in Ukraine. Volodin said that the State Duma will support deputies who want to enlist in the army and go to Ukraine.

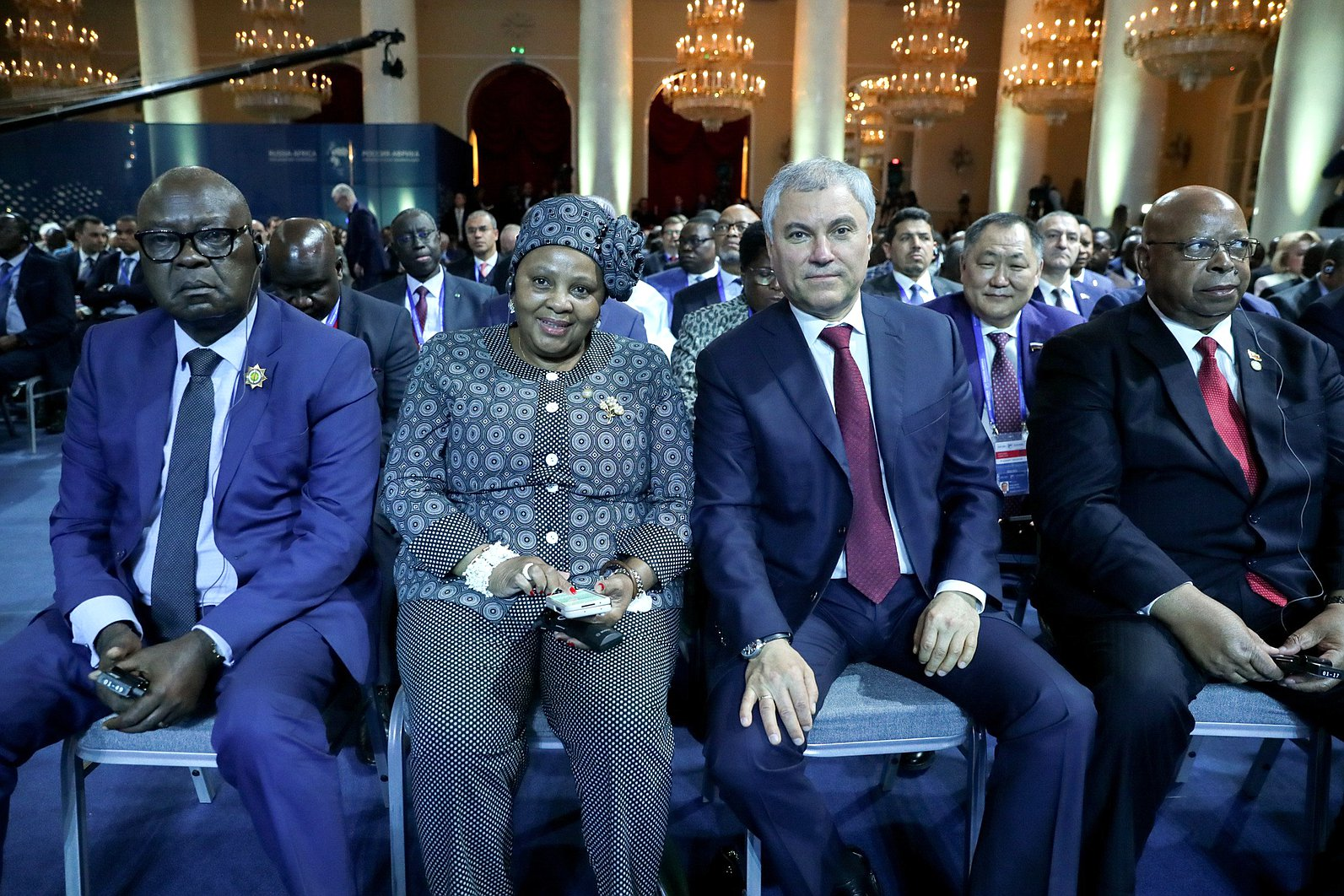
Volodin and South Africa's National Assembly Speaker Nosiviwe Mapisa-Nqakula at the "Russia-Africa" parliamentary conference in Moscow on 20 March 2023

In September 2022, Volodin met in Moscow with Chinese politician Li Zhanshu, who was then a CCP Politburo Standing Committee member and was considered one of the closest confidants of CCP general secretary Xi Jinping.

On 22 September 2022, in order to justify the military mobilization to the Russian public, he claimed that "not only armed Nazi formations, but also NATO forces are fighting against our soldiers and officers" in Ukraine. Volodin has controversially claimed that Ukraine "has lost the ability to exist as a state", "is occupied by NATO" and "has become a colony of the US".

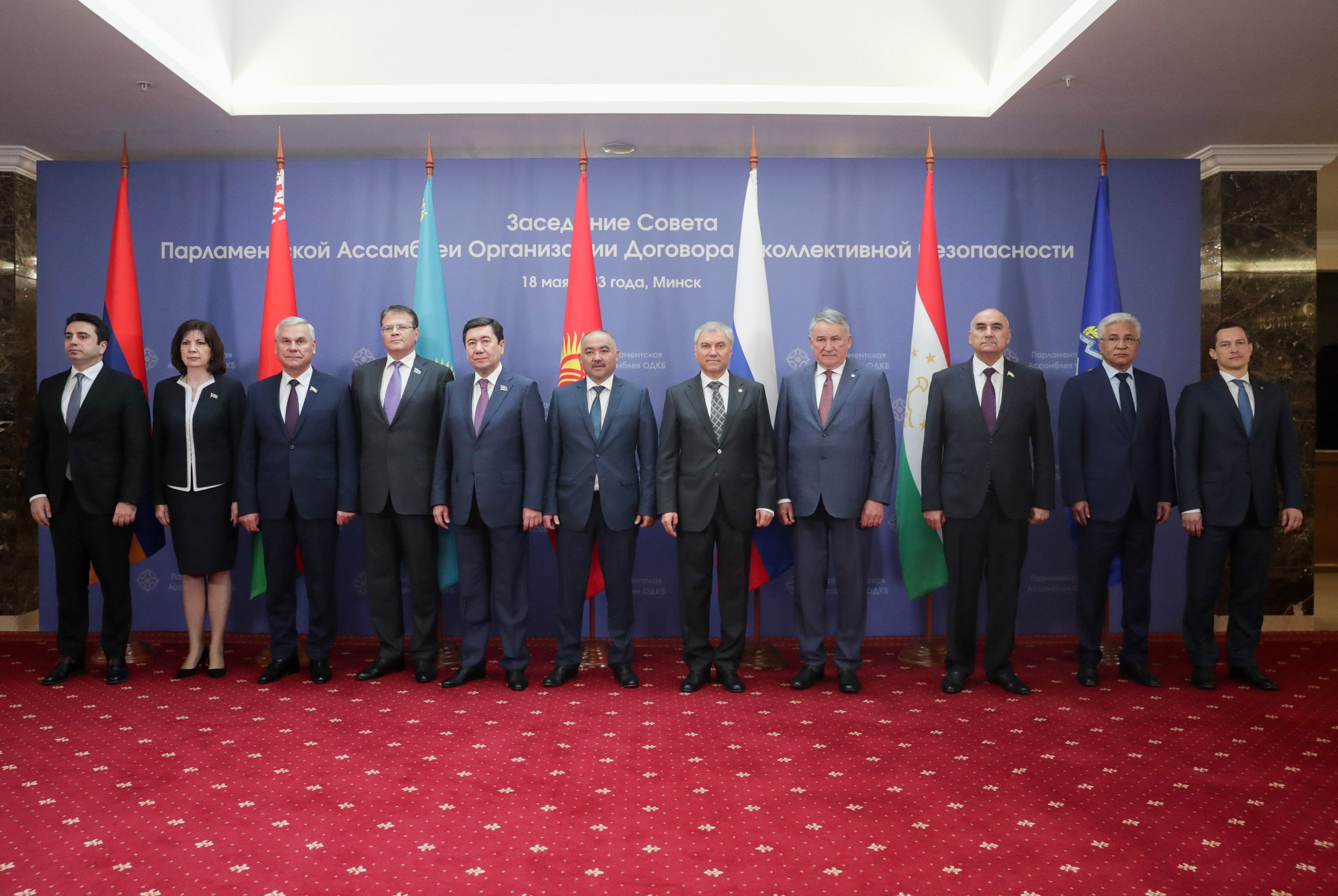
Volodin at a meeting of the Russian-led CSTO PA Council in Minsk, Belarus on 18 May 2023

To downplay the international sanctions against Russia, Volodin stated that "Western sanctions are leading to the establishment of another group of eight nations—China, India, Russia, Indonesia, Brazil, Mexico, Iran and Turkey—that is 24.4% ahead of the old group of developed countries in terms of GDP and purchasing power parity."

On 22 November 2022, he met with Cuban President Miguel Díaz-Canel. During the meeting, Volodin called Cuba "a symbol of the struggle of independence".

In January 2023, Volodin called the anti-war Russians in exile "scoundrels" and demanded the confiscation of their properties in Russia. He repeatedly called Russians who left Russia after the invasion of Ukraine as "traitors".

On 22 January 2023, Volodin threatened the use of nuclear weapons and claimed that Europe and the United States were leading the world into "global catastrophe" by providing military aid to Ukraine.

On 19–20 March 2023, the State Duma hosted the Second "Russia-Africa" International Parliamentary Conference and Volodin met with more than 40 parliamentary delegations from most African countries. In a meeting with African representatives, he claimed that Washington and Brussels seek to take control of Russian and African natural resources and continue their colonial policies, saying that "They take all measures, including violent and terrorist, for their own benefit." He held bilateral meetings with the Speaker of the National Assembly of South Africa, Nosiviwe Mapisa-Nqakula.

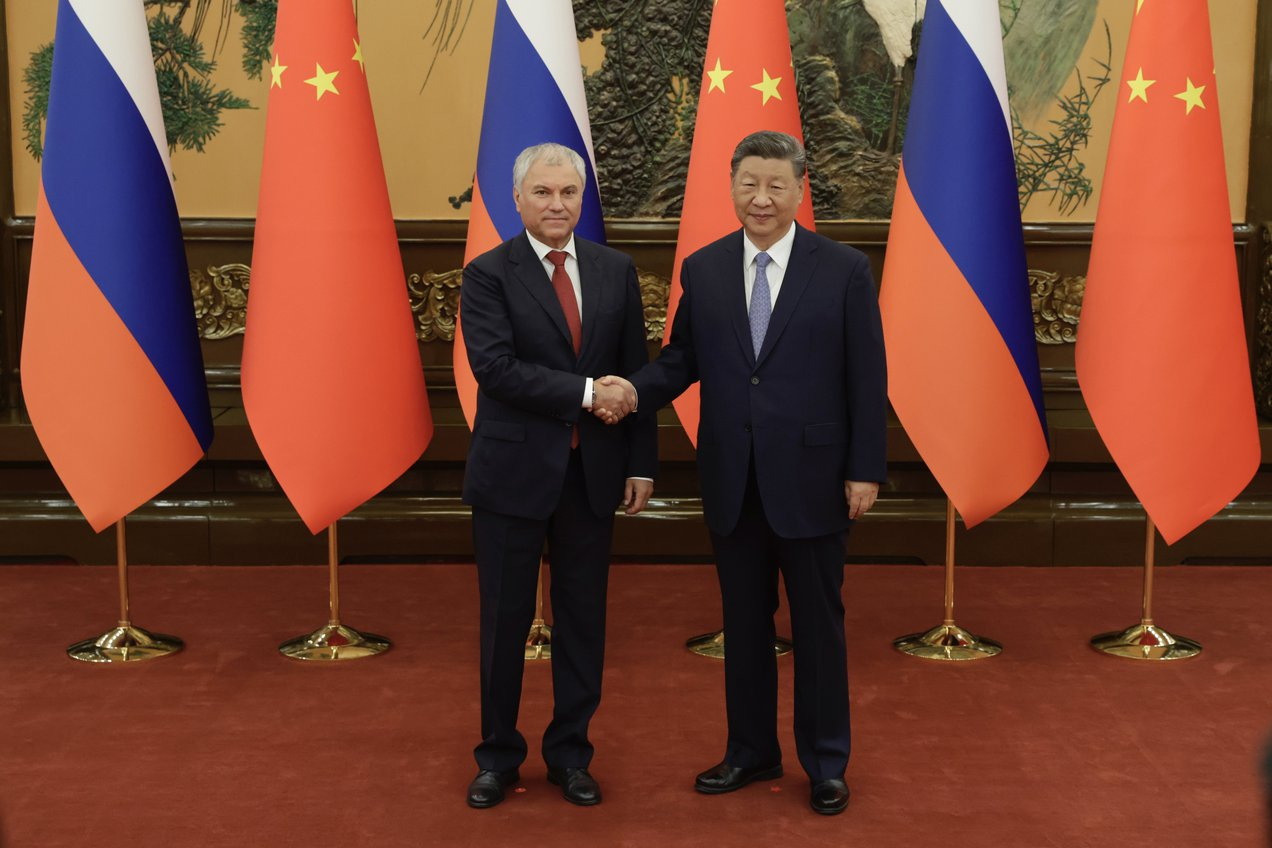
Volodin with Chinese President Xi Jinping in Beijing, 26 August 2025

On 3 May 2023, Volodin called the alleged drone attack on the Kremlin a "terrorist attack" on Russia and compared the Ukrainian government to terrorist organizations such as al-Qaeda and the Islamic State, saying that "The Nazi Kyiv regime must be recognised as a terrorist organisation." He demanded the use of "weapons capable of stopping and destroying the Kyiv terrorist regime".

On 18 May 2023, Volodin claimed that the "special military operation" in Ukraine "was inevitable." According to Volodin, "If it had not been started, the war that would have broken literally the following day or in a few days, would have dragged the world into a tragedy. That tragedy was prevented." He accused NATO, the United States and the European Union of "waging war in Ukraine" and claimed that "NATO assumed control over Ukraine, brought its mercenaries there both to power and to the battlefield."

On 3 June 2023, Volodin represented Russia at the inauguration ceremony of re-elected Turkish President Recep Tayyip Erdoğan.

On 19 June 2023, Volodin misrepresented Czech President Petr Pavel's remarks that Russians living in the West should be "monitored" and put under surveillance, and warned that Russians living abroad would be sent to concentration camps.

Volodin expressed support for Putin during the Wagner Group rebellion.

In October 2023, Volodin said that Russians who "desire the victory of the murderous Nazi Kyiv regime" should be sent to the far-eastern region of Magadan, known for its Stalin-era Gulag camps, and forced to work in the mines. In November 2023, he wrote on his Telegram channel that Russians who left the country after the Russian invasion of Ukraine and are now returning "should understand that no one here is waiting for them with open arms" because they "committed treason against Russia".

On 22 November 2023, he met with Chinese President Xi Jinping in Beijing. Volodin said that Russia and China are "not only strategic partners, but also strategic friends." They talked about deepening cooperation in the field of international platforms such as the Shanghai Cooperation Organization (SCO), the BRICS group, the Belt and Road Initiative (BRI) and the Eurasian Economic Union (EAEU).

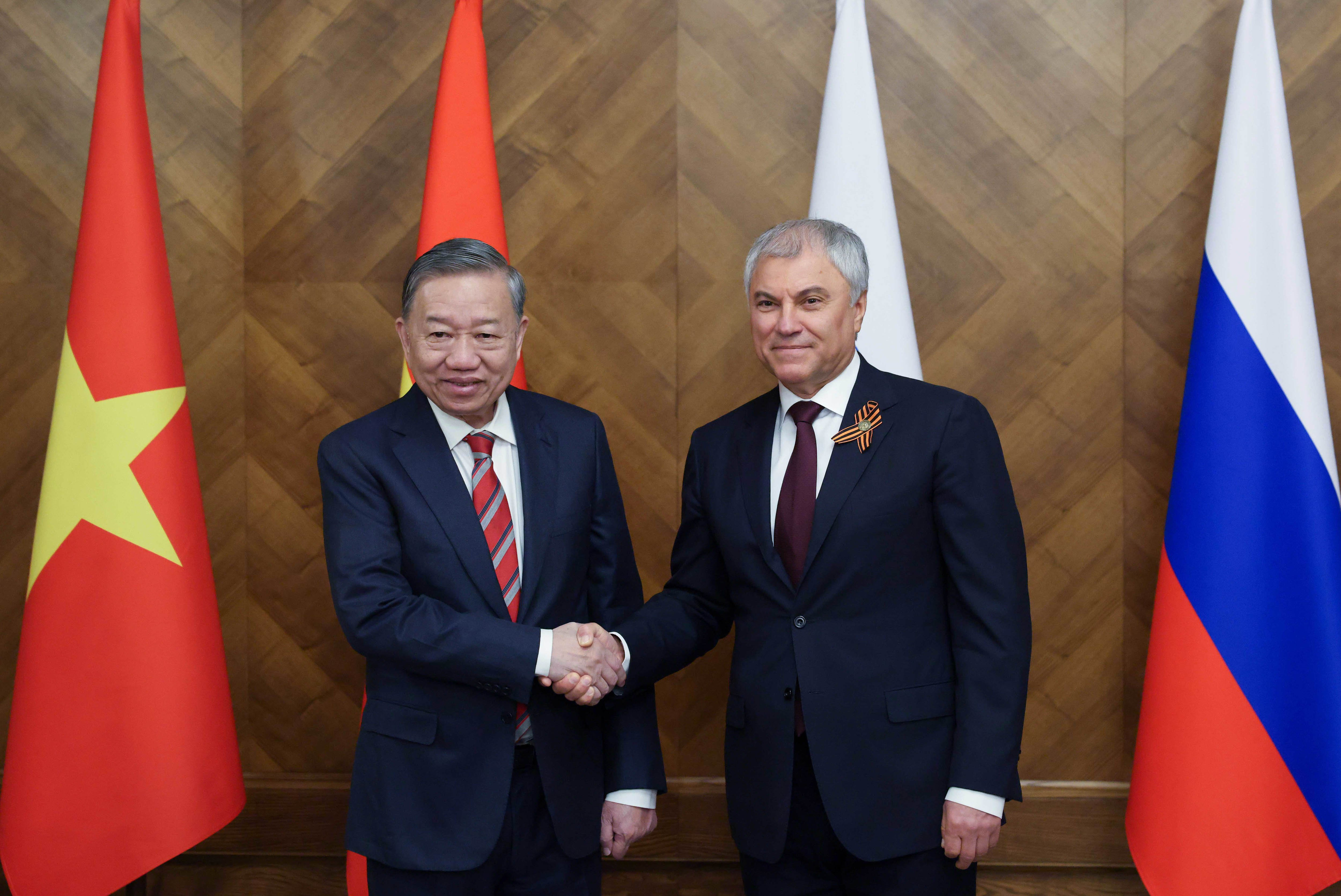
Volodin meeting with the General Secretary of the Communist Party of Vietnam Tô Lâm in Moscow, 10 May 2025

On 16 February 2024, Volodin blamed "Washington", "Brussels" and various critics of the Kremlin in Western "unfriendly countries" for the death of opposition leader Alexei Navalny.

On 6 July 2025 Communist Party of the Russian Federation congress adopted a resolution calling the 1956 report "On the Cult of Personality and Its Consequences" made by Nikita Khrushchev erroneous. Volodin praised this decision, saying that the report "formed negative attitude" towards Stalin who "did all to win the Great Patriotic War and to build the state".

Volodin has claimed that the death penalty is a fair punishment for representatives of the Ukrainian authorities, referring to them as a 'neo-Nazi regime' and 'fascists'.

== 2017 rumours of Volodin as president ==
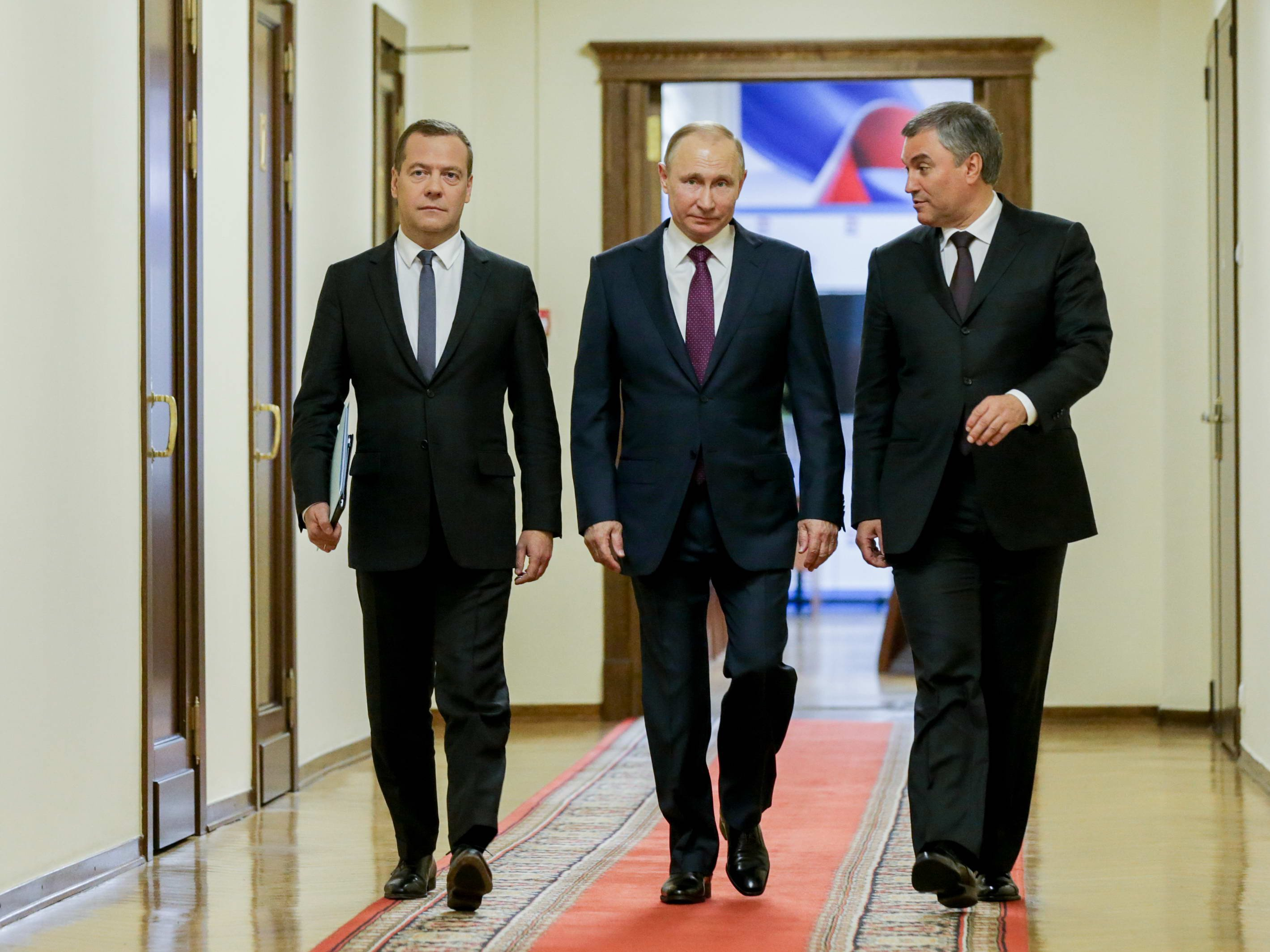
Volodin with President Putin and Prime Minister Dmitry Medvedev in May 2018

On 20 April 2017, at the meeting of the organizing committee for the Victory Day, which was held by President Vladimir Putin, the head of the Organization of Veterans of the War in Afghanistan Andrey Chepurnoy spoke. He criticized Senator Frants Klintsevich, Chairman of the Russian Union of Veterans of Afghanistan. He spoke about the letter of Klintsevich, in which he indicates Volodin as the next President. Commenting on this speech, Putin said that "the successor to the President is determined only by the Russian people in the democratic elections—and no one else". Later Klintsevich denied the words of Chepurnoy and called it slander. At the same time, one of the members of the Moscow organization "Safe Capital" said that Klintsevich really mentioned the presidential ambitions of Volodin. "At one of the meetings in 2016 with our organization Klintsevich said that it is necessary to support Volodin in all his endeavors, because he, according to Klintsevich, will be the next President of Russia". According to political scientist Stanislav Belkovsky, Volodin has presidential ambitions, but he is not going to be President "instead of Putin", and will agree to become president only if Putin offers him.

== Honours and awards (selection) ==
- Order of Friendship (1997)
- Order of Honour (2003)
- Order "For Merit to the Fatherland" 4th class (2006); 3rd class (2012), 2nd class (2014), 1st class (4 February 2024)

In 2019 he was awarded the Fiddler on the Roof Award in the Government Activity category.

== See also ==
- The Red Web by Andrei Soldatov and Irina Borogan
- SORM (Russian: Система оперативно-разыскных мероприятий (СОРМ))

Political offices
Preceded by Sergey Naryshkin	Chairman of the State Duma; 2016–present	Incumbent
