= Governor of Saratov Oblast =

Highest-ranking official in Saratov Oblast, Russia

- Standard of the Governor

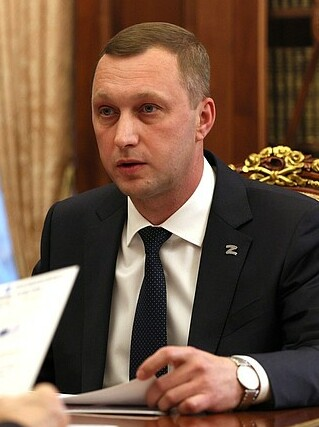
- Incumbent; Roman Busargin since 10 May 2022
- Seat: Saratov
- Term length: 5 years
- Formation: 1991
- Website: saratov.gov.ru

The Governor of Saratov Oblast (Russian: Губернатор Саратовской области) is the head of government of Saratov Oblast, a federal subject of Russia.

The position was introduced in 1991 as Head of Administration. The title of office was changed to Governor after Dmitry Ayatskov won the 1996 election.

== List of officeholders ==
No.	Portrait	Governor	Tenure	Time in office	Party	Election
—		Yury Belykh (born 1941)	25 February 1992 – 30 June 1992	3 years, 361 days	Independent	Acting
1		Yury Belykh (born 1941)	30 June 1992 – 21 February 1996 (removed)	3 years, 361 days	Independent	Appointed
—		Leonid Vashchenkov (born 1933)	21 February 1996 – 15 April 1996	54 days	Independent	Acting
2		Dmitry Ayatskov (born 1950)	15 April 1996 – 5 April 2005 (was not renominated)	8 years, 355 days	Our Home – Russia → United Russia	Appointed 1996; 2000
3		Pavel Ipatov (born 1950)	5 April 2005 – 23 March 2012 (resigned)	6 years, 353 days	United Russia	2005; 2010
—		Valery Radayev (born 1961)	23 March 2012 – 5 April 2012	10 years, 48 days	United Russia	Acting
4		Valery Radayev (born 1961)	5 April 2012 – 17 March 2017 (resigned)	10 years, 48 days	United Russia	2012
—		Valery Radayev (born 1961)	17 March 2017 – 21 September 2017	10 years, 48 days	United Russia	Acting
(4)		Valery Radayev (born 1961)	21 September 2017 – 10 May 2022 (resigned)	10 years, 48 days	United Russia	2017
—		Roman Busargin (born 1981)	10 May 2022 – 16 September 2022	4 years, 120 days	United Russia	Acting
5		Roman Busargin (born 1981)	16 September 2022 – present	4 years, 120 days	United Russia	2022
