= Valery Radayev =

Russian politician

- Валерий Радаев
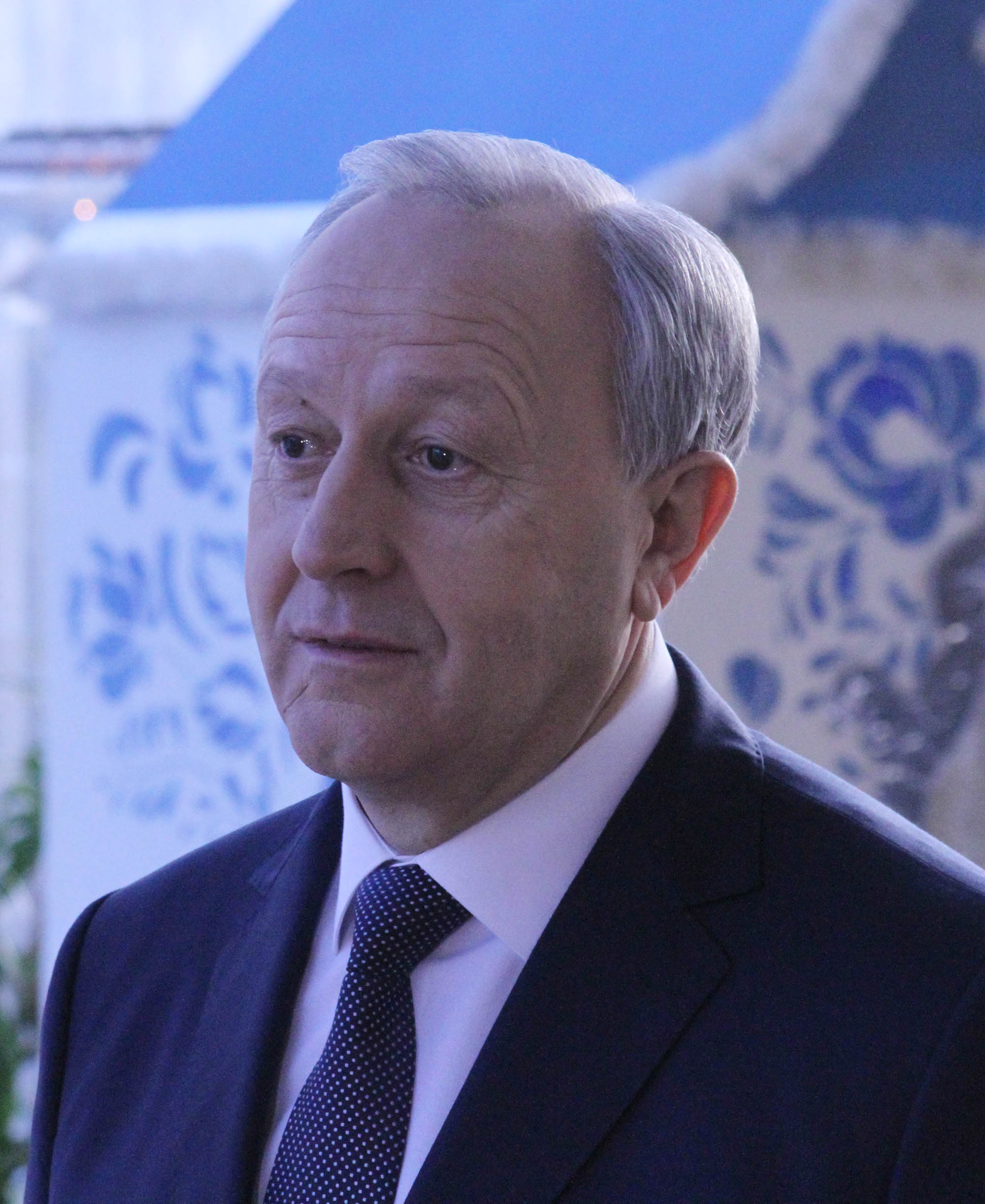
- Radayev in 2017

4th Governor of Saratov Oblast
- In office 5 April 2012 – 10 May 2022
- Preceded by: Pavel Ipatov
- Succeeded by: Roman Busargin (acting)

Personal details
- Born: 2 April 1961 (age 65)
- Party: United Russia
- Education: Saratov State Agrarian University

Valery Vasilyevich Radayev (Russian: Валерий Васильевич Радаев; born 2 April 1961) is a Russian politician who served as Governor of Saratov Oblast from 2012 to 2022. He succeeded Pavel Ipatov, who resigned on 23 March 2012. He was the chairman of the Saratov Oblast Duma from December 2007 until April 2012.

== Biography ==
Radaev was born 2 April 1961, in the village of Blagodatnoe that is in Khvalynsky District of Saratov Oblast. From 1980 to 1982 he was a conscript in the Soviet Army, and from 1983 onwards he was employed in agricultural enterprises. His first job in the sector was as a machine engineer. From 1993 to 1996 he headed Blagodatinsky state-owned farm.

In 1994, he graduated from Saratov State agricultural university (Russian: Саратовский институт механизации сельского хозяйства). From 1996 to 2005 he was the head of Saratov Oblast’s Khvalynsky District, the birthplace of Vyacheslav Volodin, the future First Deputy of the Presidential Administration of Russia and Speaker of the State Duma.

From 2005 to 2007 he was the head of the Federal Veterinary and Phytosanitary Control in Saratov Oblast. In 2007, he was elected as a deputy to the fourth convocation of the Saratov Oblast Duma, the local legislature. The same year, he was elected speaker and chairman of the Saratov Oblast Duma.

On 23 March 2012, he was appointed Acting Governor of Saratov Oblast following resignation of Governor Pavel Ipatov. On April 2, 2012, Dmitry Medvedev, the then President of Russia, requested the Saratov Oblast Duma to appoint Valery Radaev as Governor of the region.

On 5 April 2012, the Saratov Oblast Duma approved Valery Radaev as Governor of Saratov Oblast. He is a member of United Russia party, holds a PhD degree in Sociology. He is married and has a son. Radaev is seen as the protégé of former deputy head of the presidential staff Vyacheslav Volodin by being his fellow countryman. In November 2013 he was elected to the Supreme Council of United Russia.

On 10 May 2022, Radayev resigned from the position of Saratov Oblast governor. He was succeeded by his deputy Roman Busargin.

== Sanctions ==
In December 2022 the EU sanctioned Valery Radayev in relation to the 2022 Russian invasion of Ukraine.

== Sources ==
- This article is sourced from Russian Wikipedia
- Saratov Governor's Page in Russian
- Радаев Валерий Васильевич на сайте Саратовской областной думы
- Радаев Валерий Васильевич на сайте Правительства Саратовской области
