= Oleg Alekseyev =

Russian politician (born 1967)

- Олег Александрович Алексеев

Russian Federation Senator from Saratov Oblast
- Incumbent
- Assumed office 8 April 2020
- Preceded by: Lyudmila Bokova
- In office 28 September 2016 – 21 September 2017
- Preceded by: Mikhail Isaev
- Succeeded by: Lyudmila Bokova

Member of the Saratov Oblast Duma
- In office September 2017 – 8 April 2020
- In office October 2012 – 28 September 2016

Personal details
- Born: Oleg Aleksandrovich Alekseyev; 21 December 1967 (age 58) Kurilovka, Saratov Oblast, Russian SFSR, Soviet Union
- Education: Saratov State Agrarian University

Oleg Aleksandrovich Alekseyev (Russian: Олег Александрович Алексеев; born 21 December 1967) is a Russian politician. He has served as a deputy in the Saratov Oblast Duma twice, and is currently a member of the Federation Council from Saratov. Alekseyev served as a senator from the United Russia party from 28 September 2016 to 21 September 2017 and from 8 April 2020.

== Early life ==
Oleg Aleksandrovich Alekseyev was born on 21 December 1967 in the village of Kurilovka, Novouzensky District, Saratov Oblast. In 1994 he graduated from the Saratov Institute of Agricultural Mechanization with a degree in mechanical engineering. In 2003 he graduated from the Stolypin Povolzhskaya Academy of Public Administration with a degree in management. After graduating from school in August 1985, he began work as a laborer. From November 1986 to November 1988, he served in the Soviet Army. After this, he worked part-time as a supplier at SSAU.

== Politics ==
In October 2012 Alekseyev was elected a deputy of the Saratov Oblast Duma of the fifth convocation. On 28 September 2016 he was elected to the Federation Council. He was a member of the Committee on Agrarian and Food Policy and Environmental Management, however he resigned in September 2017.

In September 2017, Alekseyev was again elected a deputy of the Saratov Oblast Duma. He worked as the first deputy director of the Federal State Budgetary Institution "Management of Saratovmeliovodkhoz". In April 2020, by the decision of the Saratov Oblast Duma, he was again elected to the Federation Council with a term expiring in September 2022. He is now a Member of the Committee on the Rules and Organization of Parliamentary Activities.
