= Zurab Makiev =

Russian politician

- Зураб Макиев
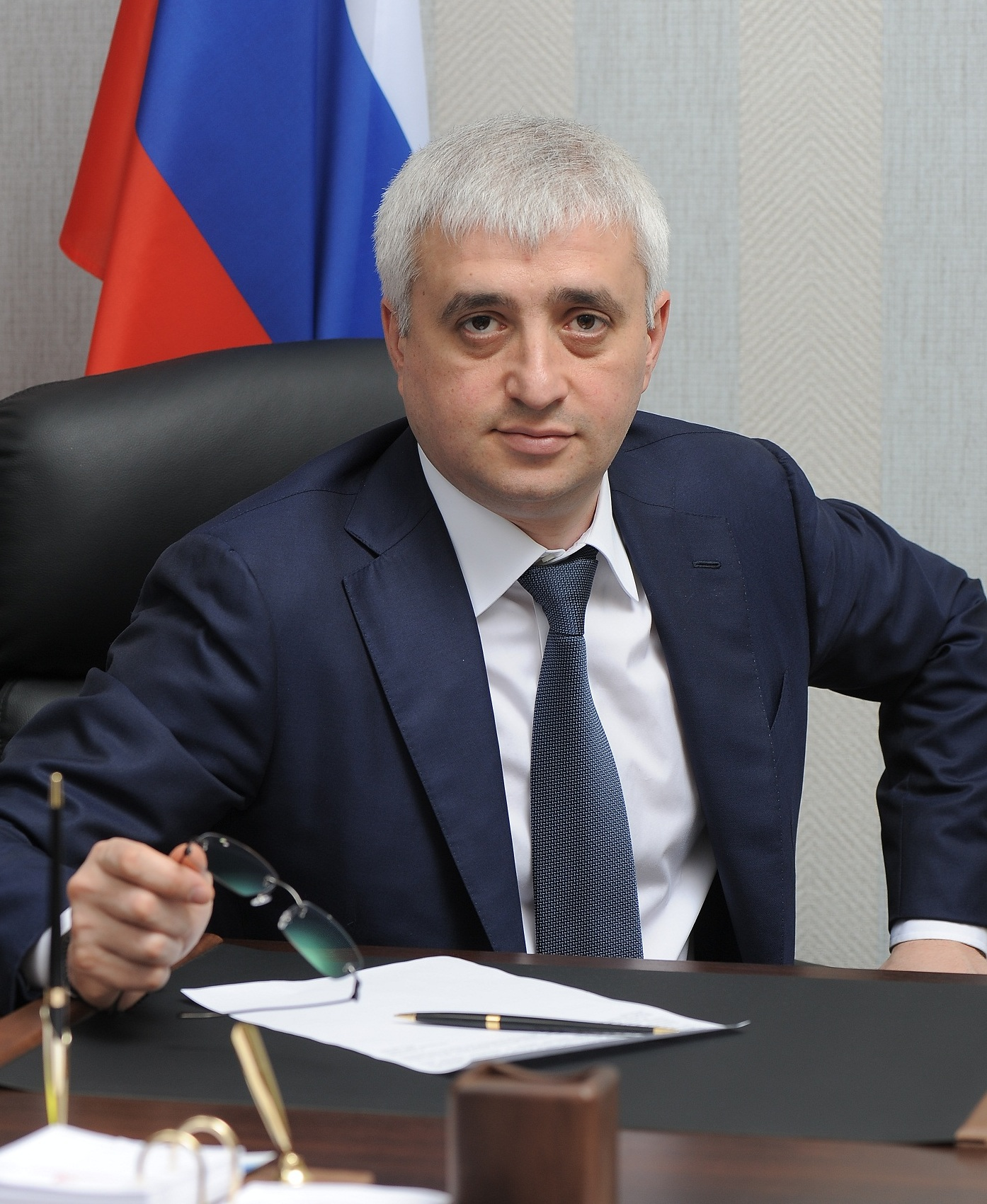

Deputy of the 8th State Duma
- Incumbent
- Assumed office 19 September 2021

Deputy of the 7th State Duma
- In office 5 October 2016 – 12 October 2021

Deputy of the 6th State Duma
- In office 21 December 2011 – 5 October 2016

Personal details
- Born: 30 September 1976 (age 49) Tbilisi, Georgian Soviet Socialist Republic, USSR
- Party: United Russia
- Education: Rostov Military Institute of Rocket Troops

Zurab Makiev (Russian: Зураб Гайозович Макиев; born 30 September 1976, Tbilisi) is a Russian political figure and a deputy of the 6th, 7th, and 8th State Dumas. In 2002, Makiyev was granted a Candidate of Sciences in sociology degree.

In 2000, he worked as an executor of bailiff duties at the Ministry of Justice of the Republic of North Ossetia–Alania. From 2004 to 2006, Makiev served as deputy director of the Scientific Center of Legal Information at the Ministry of Justice in Moscow. In 2006, he was appointed deputy head of the Department of the Ministry of Justice for the Southern Federal District. In 2009, he held the position of first deputy director of the Finance Department of the Kostroma Oblast. From 2009 to 2012, Makiev served as deputy head of Igor Shuvalov, who at that time was the First Deputy Prime Minister of Russia. In 2014, Makiev was elected deputy of the 6th State Duma. In 2016 and 2021, he became the deputy of the 7th and 8th State Dumas, respectively.

== Sanctions ==
On February 23, 2022, he was added to the European Union sanctions list for actions and policies that undermine the territorial integrity, sovereignty, and independence of Ukraine and further destabilize the country.

On February 24, 2022, he was included in Canada's sanctions list of “close associates of the regime” for voting in favor of recognizing the independence of the so-called republics in Donetsk and Luhansk.

On March 24, 2022, amid Russia's invasion of Ukraine, he was added to the U.S. sanctions list for “being complicit in Putin’s war” and “supporting the Kremlin’s efforts to invade Ukraine.”

The U.S. Department of State stated that State Duma deputies use their powers to persecute dissent and political opponents, suppress freedom of information, and restrict human rights and fundamental freedoms of Russian citizens.

Subsequently, he was also sanctioned by the United Kingdom, Switzerland, Australia, Japan, Ukraine, and New Zealand on similar grounds.
