= Saratov City Duma =

City duma of Saratov, Russia

Saratov City Duma Саратовская городская дума
- 5th legislature

Type
- Type: Unicameral

Leadership
- Acting Chairman: Anatoly Serebryakov, United Russia

Structure
- Seats: 35
- Political groups: United Russia (30); LDPR (3); Communist Party (1); A Just Russia (1)

Elections
- Voting system: Single-member districts
- Last election: 21 September 2021
- Next election: 2026

Website
- saratovduma.ru

The Saratov City Duma (Russian: Саратовская городская дума, romanized: Saratovskaya gorodskaya duma) is the city duma of Saratov, Russia.

== Composition ==
=== 2021 ===
The results from the 2021 Russian elections are as follows:

Party	Seats
United Russia	30
Liberal Democratic Party of Russia	3
Communist Party of the Russian Federation	1
A Just Russia	1

=== 2016 ===
The results from the 2016 Russian elections are as follows:

Party	Seats
United Russia	33
Communist Party of the Russian Federation	2
Liberal Democratic Party of Russia	1
A Just Russia	1
Independent	4

=== 2006 ===
The results from the 2006 Russian elections are as follows:

Party	Single-district seats	Party-list vote share (%)
United Russia	13	44.18
Communist Party of the Russian Federation	6	19.31
Liberal Democratic Party of Russia	2	7.89
People's Union	0	6.50
Rodina	0	5.82
Yabloko	0	4.27
Russian Party of Life	0	1.19
People's Patriotic Union of Russia	0	0.65
Against All	N/A	7.69
Total voters / Turnout	220,878	33.73
