= Asbestovsky (rural locality) =

Rural locality in Alapayevsk, Sverdlovsk Oblast, Russia

Coordinates: 57°46′16″N 61°23′59″E

Asbestovsky or Asbestovskiy (Russian: Асбестовский) is a rural locality (a settlement) under the administrative jurisdiction of the town of Alapayevsk, Sverdlovsk Oblast, Russia. It lies roughly 100 kilometres northeast of Yekaterinburg.

== Economy ==
It contains a crush stone plant and a polytechnic. It is also a centre for the logging industry.

== Notable people ==
- Pavel Ivatov, an engineer and politician was born in Asbestovsky on April, 12, 1950.
