= Olga Alimova =

Russian politician (born 1953)

Olga Alimova MP
- Ольга Алимова
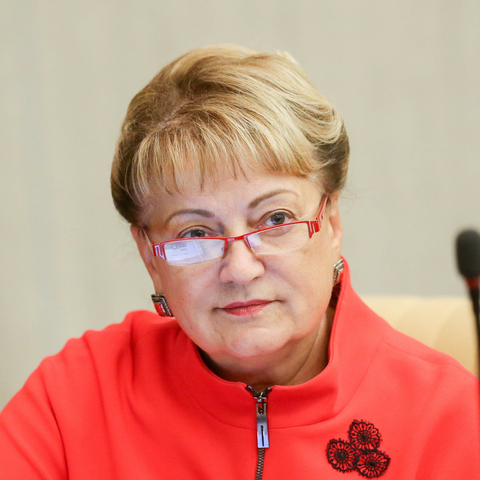

Member of the State Duma (Party List Seat)
- Incumbent
- Assumed office 12 October 2021
- In office 21 December 2011 – 5 October 2016

Member of the State Duma for Saratov Oblast
- In office 17 September 2018 – 12 October 2021
- Preceded by: Oleg Grishchenko
- Succeeded by: Vyacheslav Volodin
- Constituency: Saratov (No. 163)

Personal details
- Born: 10 April 1953 (age 73) Saratov, RSFSR, USSR
- Party: CPRF
- Other political affiliations: CPSU (until 1991)
- Children: 1
- Education: Saratov Polytechnic Institute; Volga Sociopolitical Institute; Saratov State Academy of Law
- Occupation: politician, engineer

Olga Nikolaevna Alimova (Russian: Ольга Николаевна Алимова; born 10 April 1953) is a Russian politician who was a member of the State Duma for Saratov Oblast from 2011 to 2016 and from 2018 to 2021. She was re-elected to the State Duma in the 2021 Russian legislative elections. She is a member of the Communist Party of the Russian Federation, and is the leader of that party's Saratov branch. Alimova is an advocate for the re-introduction of the death penalty. Alimova received attention in October 2019, when she denounced indie video game Sex with Stalin as "disgusting".

== Professional Career ==
She worked as an engineer at the Saratov State Union Design Institute and later as a forewoman at the Saratov Aviation Plant.

From 1977, she worked as a heating engineer and design engineer at the Saratov Heavy Gear-Cutting Machine Tool Plant.

From 1981 to 1990, she headed the political education office at the V. I. Lenin Plant and later served as secretary of the plant’s Communist Party committee.

In 1990, she was elected Deputy Chairman of the Zavodskoy District Council of People’s Deputies of Saratov. She was one of the organizers involved in re-establishing the Communist Party in Saratov.

From 1993 to 1994, she worked as an engineer at the Rikovtormash joint venture, a chief specialist at the Saratov Regional Employment Centre, and an inspector in the administration of the Zavodskoy branch of Ekonombank.

From 1994 to 1998, she served as Deputy Head of the Department for Cooperation with Local Self-Government Bodies of the Saratov Regional Duma.

From March 1998 to November 2002, she worked full-time as an assistant to State Duma deputy Valery Rashkin, who served in the 2nd and 3rd convocations.

Since 1998, she has served as Secretary of the Saratov Regional Committee of the Communist Party of the Russian Federation (CPRF). From 2000 to 2004, she was a candidate member of the CPRF Central Committee, becoming a full member in 2004.

In 2002, she became coordinator of the All-Russian Women’s Union “Hope of Russia” in the Volga Federal District.

From 2002 to 2007, she was a member of the 3rd Saratov Regional Duma, and from 2007 to 2011, a member of its 4th convocation. She was elected on 3 November 2002 in a by-election for Zavodskoy single-member constituency No. 2 and re-elected on 2 December 2007 on the CPRF party list. From 2007 to 2011, she served as Deputy Chair of the Committee on State-Building and Local Self-Government.

In March 2011, she became First Secretary of the Saratov Regional Committee of the CPRF.

From 2011 to 2016, she served as a member of the 6th State Duma of the Russian Federation. She was elected on 4 December 2011 on the CPRF federal party list, heading regional group No. 59 for the Saratov Region. She joined the Communist faction and served on the State Duma Committee on Family, Women and Children.

On 18 September 2016, she ran for the 7th State Duma in Balashov single-member constituency No. 165 in the Saratov Region. She finished second with 14.04% of the vote, behind United Russia candidate Mikhail Isaev, who received 53.71%. At the same time, she headed the CPRF list in the Saratov City Duma elections but declined the seat after the election.

From January to September 2017, she worked as an assistant to 7th State Duma deputy Valery Rashkin.

On 10 September 2017, she contested both the Saratov Region gubernatorial election and elections to the 6th Saratov Regional Duma. In the gubernatorial race, she received 16.28% of the vote and finished second behind acting governor Valery Radaev of United Russia, who received 74.63%.

On the same day, she was elected to the 6th Saratov Regional Duma on the CPRF party list. On 19 September 2017, she became Deputy Chair of the Regional Duma and head of the CPRF faction. She also served on three committees: State-Building and Local Self-Government; Agrarian Affairs, Land Relations, Ecology and Environmental Management; and Culture, Public Relations and Information Policy.

On 9 September 2018, she was elected to the 7th State Duma as a CPRF candidate in a by-election for Saratov single-member constituency No. 163. The seat had become vacant following the death of State Duma deputy Oleg Grishchenkoin June 2017. Olga Alimova received 45.35% of the vote, while LDPR candidate Dmitry Pyanykh finished second with 16.01%.

On 19 September 2021, she was elected to the 8th State Duma on the CPRF party list, standing first in regional group No. 22, which covered the Kaliningrad and Saratov regions.

On 11 September 2022, she again ran for Governor of the Saratov Region as the CPRF candidate. She finished second with 14.19% of the vote, behind acting regional governor Roman Busargin of United Russia, who received 72.55%.
