= Saratov Oblast Duma =

Regional parliament of Saratov Oblast, Russia

Saratov Oblast Duma Саратовская областная дума
- 7th legislature

Type
- Type: Unicameral

Leadership
- Chairman: Aleksandr Romanov, United Russia since 10 April 2019

Structure
- Seats: 40
- Political groups: United Russia (29) CPRF (5); LDPR (2); SRZP (2); New People (1) Rodina (1)

Elections
- Voting system: Mixed
- Last election: 11 September 2022
- Next election: 2027

Meeting place
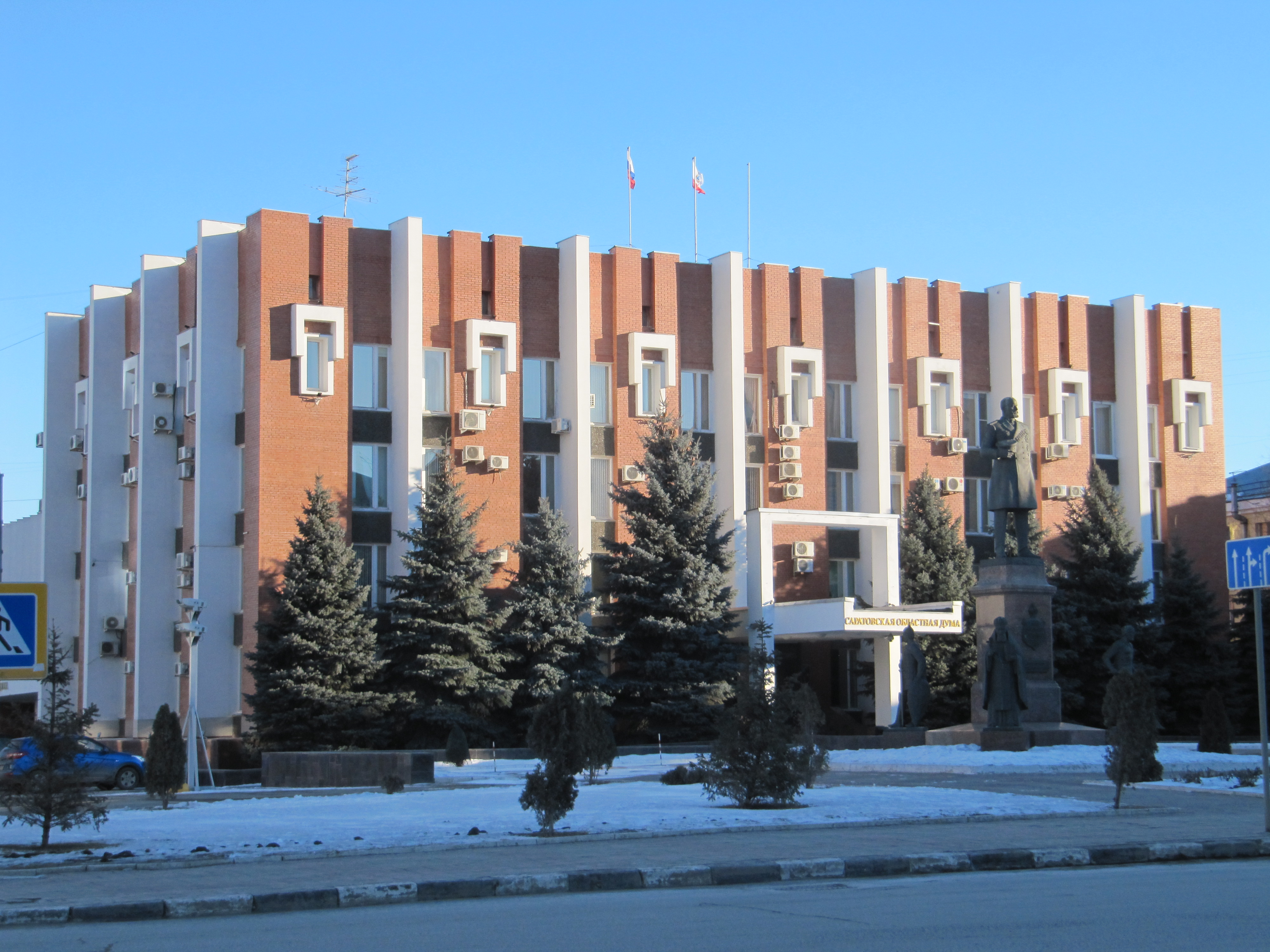
- 24a, Ulitsa Radishcheva, Saratov

Website
- srd.ru

The Saratov Oblast Duma (Russian: Саратовская областная дума, romanized: Saratovskaya oblastnaya duma) is the regional parliament of Saratov Oblast, a federal subject of Russia. A total of 40 deputies are elected for five-year terms.

== History ==
The 2017 Saratov Oblast Duma elections took place on 10 September 2017, and the first meeting of the 6th convocation took place on 19 September.

In February 2022, Nikolai Bondarenko was impeached from the Saratov Oblast Duma by a vote from other deputies on the grounds of improperly declaring donations to his YouTube channel.

On April 4, 2022, the powers of the deputy from A Just Russia Zinaida Samsonova were terminated.

== Elections ==
=== 5th convocation (2012–2017) ===
Party	Seats
United Russia	43
Communist Party of Russian Federation	1
A Just Russia	1

=== 6th convocation (2017–2022) ===
Party	Seats
United Russia	36
Communist Party of Russian Federation	5
Liberal Democratic Party of Russia	2
A Just Russia	1
Self-nominated	1

=== 7th convocation (2022–2027) ===
Party	%	Seats (Note: Reduced from 45 to 40 seats)
United Russia	60.50	29
Communist Party of the Russian Federation	14.35	5
Liberal Democratic Party of Russia	9.24	2
A Just Russia — For Truth	6.79	2
New People	3.54	1
Rodina	1.61	1
Registered voters/turnout	53.69	
