= Saratov State Agrarian University =

Agricultural school in Saratov, Russia

Coordinates: 51.5306196°N 46.0348123°E

Saratov State University of Genetics, Biotechnology and Engineering named after N.I. Vavilov
- Саратовский государственный университет генетики, биотехнологии и инженерии имени Н. И. Вавилова
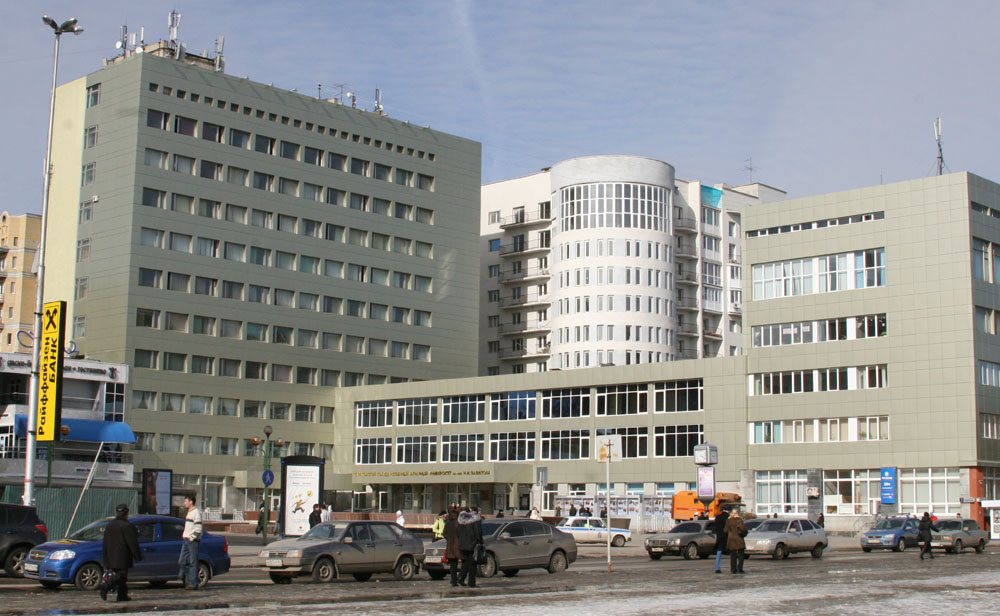
- Type: Public
- Established: 15 September 1913 (112 years ago)
- Rector: Solovyov Dmitry Alexandrovich
- Location: Saratov, Russia
- Website: en.sgau.ru

Saratov State University of Genetics, Biotechnology and Engineering named after N.I. Vavilov (Russian: Саратовский государственный университет генетики, биотехнологии и инженерии имени Н. И. Вавилова) is an agricultural higher education institution in the Volga region.

== History ==
On 15 September 1913, the Higher Agricultural Courses were established in Saratov to train agronomists. There were 105 people in the first enrollment of students of these courses. One of the founders, as well as the first director of the courses, was the chief agronomist of Saratov, Boris Kharlampievich Medvedev. On 5 April 1918, by the decision of the People's Commissariat of Agriculture and the People's Commissariat of Education, the Higher Agricultural Courses were transformed into the Saratov Agricultural Institute, but already on September 20 of the same year, the institute was attached to the Saratov State University as an agronomic faculty.

In 1917–1921, geneticist Nikolai Ivanovich Vavilov was engaged in scientific and pedagogical work at the courses and at the institute.

In May 1922, the Faculty of Agronomy separated from the State University and again became an institute. The first director of the institute was a biologist, professor V. R. Zalensky. At that time, such prominent scientists as A. I. Stebut. In 1923, the reclamation faculty was opened. In this regard, the Saratov Agricultural Institute was renamed the Saratov Institute of Agriculture and Land Reclamation.

At the beginning of the 20th century, such educational institutions as the State Zootechnical and Veterinary Institute (1918) and the Institute of Mechanization and Electrification of Agriculture (1932; on the basis of the Moscow Institute of Agricultural Engineering transferred to Saratov) were formed in the city.

By the Decree of the Government of the Russian Federation of 18 December 1997 “On improving the system of vocational education in the Saratov region”, three higher educational institutions of an agricultural profile - the Saratov State Agricultural Academy named after. N. I. Vavilov, Saratov State Agroengineering University and Saratov State Academy of Veterinary Medicine and Biotechnology were merged into Saratov State Agrarian University named after N. I. Vavilov.

B. Z. Dvorkin became the first rector of the united university in April 1998 (he died in 2003). In May 2003, Nikolai Ivanovich Kuznetsov was elected Rector of the University. On 19 March 2021, Dmitry Aleksandrovich Solovyov was appointed to the position of rector.

On 22 June 2022, the Academic Council unanimously supported the university’s transformation program and decided to petition the Ministry of Agriculture of the Russian Federation to rename the university into “Saratov State University of Genetics, Biotechnology and Engineering named after N.I. Vavilov". On 8 July 2022, the name was approved.

== Faculties ==
- Faculty of Agronomy
- Faculty of Agroengineering and Environmental Engineering
- Faculty of Economy and Management
- Faculty of Veterinary Medicine, Food and Biotechnology
- Institute of distance learning and further education
