= British Airways ethnic liveries =

1997–1999 livery used by British Airways

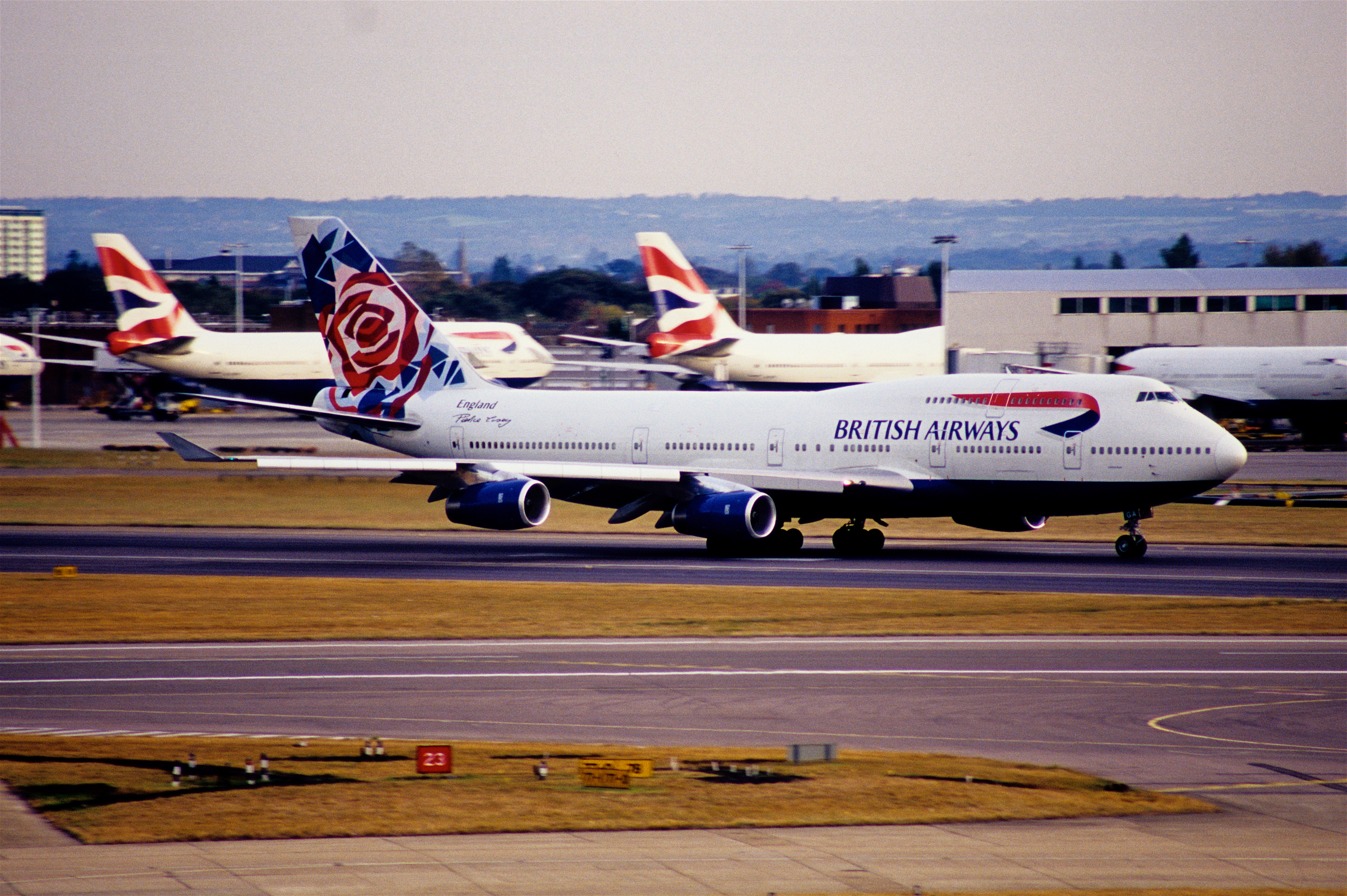
A Boeing 747-400 wearing the Chelsea Rose livery takes off past two other 747s in the Chatham Dockyard livery, c. 2002

In 1997 British Airways (BA) adopted a new livery. One part of this was a newly stylised version of the British Airways "Speedbird" logo, the "Speedmarque", but the major change was the introduction of tail-fin art. Also known as the Utopia, World Tails and world image tailfins, they used art and designs from international artists and other sources to represent communities in countries served by BA's route network. The signature of the artist was carried near the design on the tail.

The new corporate logo was created by the London-based design agency Newell & Sorrell, who also oversaw the implementation of the tailfin designs.

The German designs refer to the BA subsidiary Deutsche BA, the French designs refer to the BA subsidiary Air Liberté, and the Australian designs refer to BA's alliance with Qantas.

== History ==
=== Launch and reception ===
Our existing livery has served us well. It helped transform our company in preparation for privatisation. Now all of our research is telling us we must change again, to prepare for the exciting new era that the new millennium will bring.
...
The identity we unveil publicly today is that of a global, caring company, more modern, more open, more cosmopolitan, but proud to be based in Britain.

— Bob Ayling, Why we are changing our identity, speech of 10 June 1997

The adoption of this aircraft livery was seen as a move away from the traditional British image of the carrier. BA claimed that the previous Landor Associates scheme carried an air of arrogance and detachment, and insisted that the new tailfins were popular with international travelers. In addition to the new tail art, the crest and motto "To Fly. To Serve." were dropped from the livery to make the airline appear more "global and caring." In his speech at the launch, Chief Executive Robert Ayling declared that BA needed "a corporate identity that will enable [it] to become not just a UK carrier, but a global airline that is based in Britain" and the airline should better reflect the international image of the UK as "friendly, diverse and open to other cultures." The total cost of the rebranding was estimated at £60 million, of which £2m was paid to artists and the Newell and Sorrell design firm.

The initial rollout consisted of 15 distinct tail art designs. Quentin Newark later called the initiative "incredibly brave" and praised the work of Newell and Sorrell as "expressive [and] gleeful".

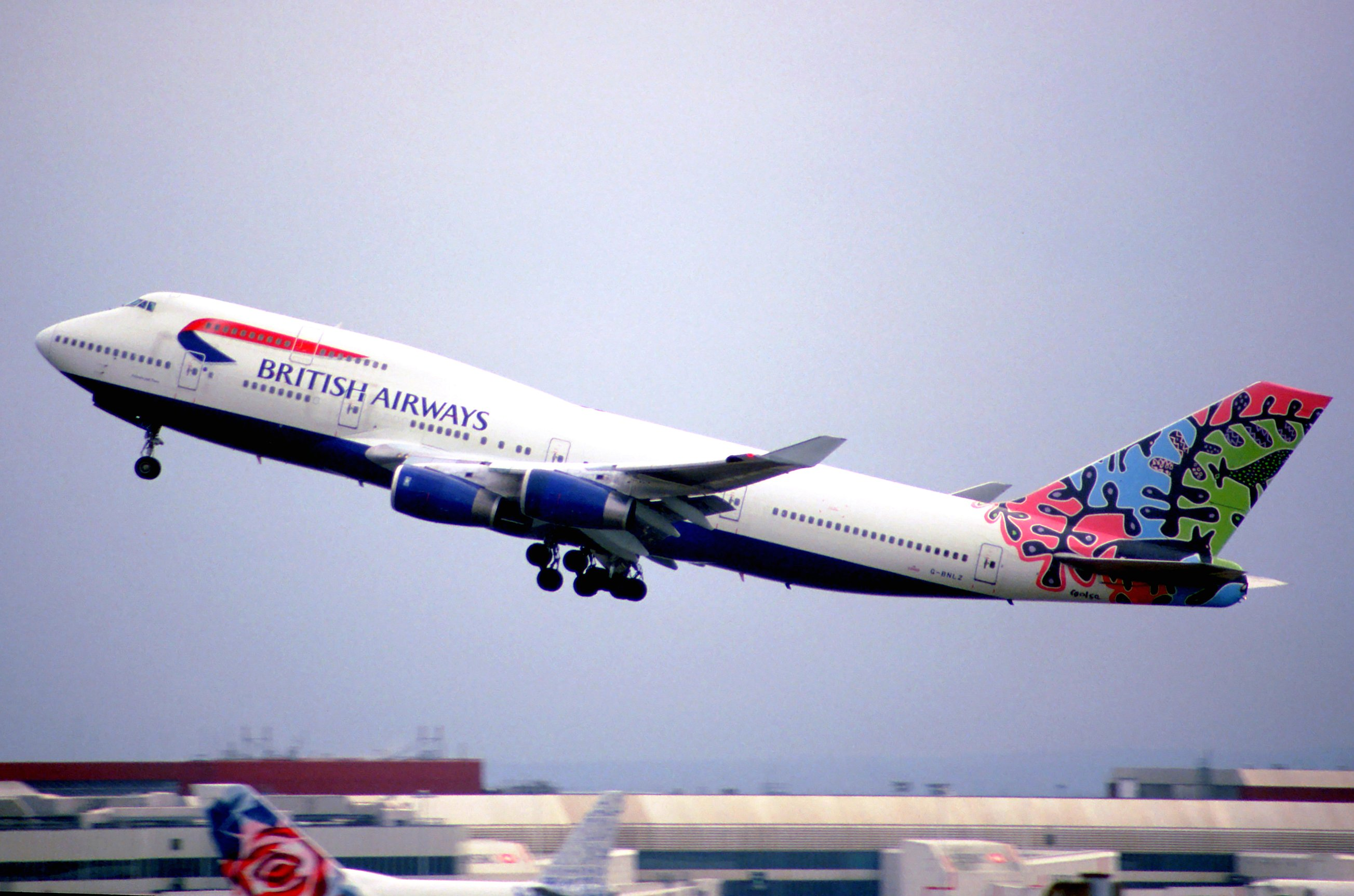
Former Prime Minister Margaret Thatcher covered the tailfin of a model 747 painted with Animals and Trees like this one.

However, they were unpopular with many traditionalists in the UK, despite nine of the designs being inspired by either England, Scotland or Wales. Flight crews derided the new designs as "Air Zulu." Jonathan Glancey criticised the Utopia project as "muddle-headed and messy - ethnic designs turned into the equivalent of doll's-house wallpaper, things applied but not belonging", failing to give the airline a cohesive identity. Glancey added the ethnic designs "had the net effect of trivializing art and design from around the world" and gave the impression that BA was "some sort of well-meaning colonial-era schoolteacher, encouraging "new-caught sullen peoples" to stick their colourful doodles and examples of their beadwork". Former Prime Minister Margaret Thatcher showed her displeasure at the designs by covering one of the new tailfins (Animals and Trees) on a model 747 with tissue paper. She declared, "We fly the British flag, not these awful things" in 1997. Thatcher also indicated with these fins the airline would lose its identity. Amongst BA passengers, the highest rate of disapproval for the new designs was registered by business travelers between North America and Great Britain.

Virgin Atlantic took advantage of the controversy by applying a Union flag scheme to the front end of its aircraft. In their own 1999 relaunch, the flag was also applied to the vertical winglets of Virgin Atlantic's aircraft.

=== Review of use ===
While the majority of the designs were applied to a variety of aircraft models, one scheme (the stylised version of the Chatham Dockyard Union Flag) was used on Concorde only. By 1999, BA had repainted around half its fleet (170 aircraft) in its new colours but then Chief Executive, Robert Ayling, announced a review of this process. The aircraft already repainted would keep the new designs, but the remainder of the fleet (still showing the Landor design) would receive a variant of Concorde's Union Flag design. The announcement was timed to divert some attention from Virgin's relaunch. Chris Holt, the head of design management at BA who led the Utopia Project, resigned in October 1999.

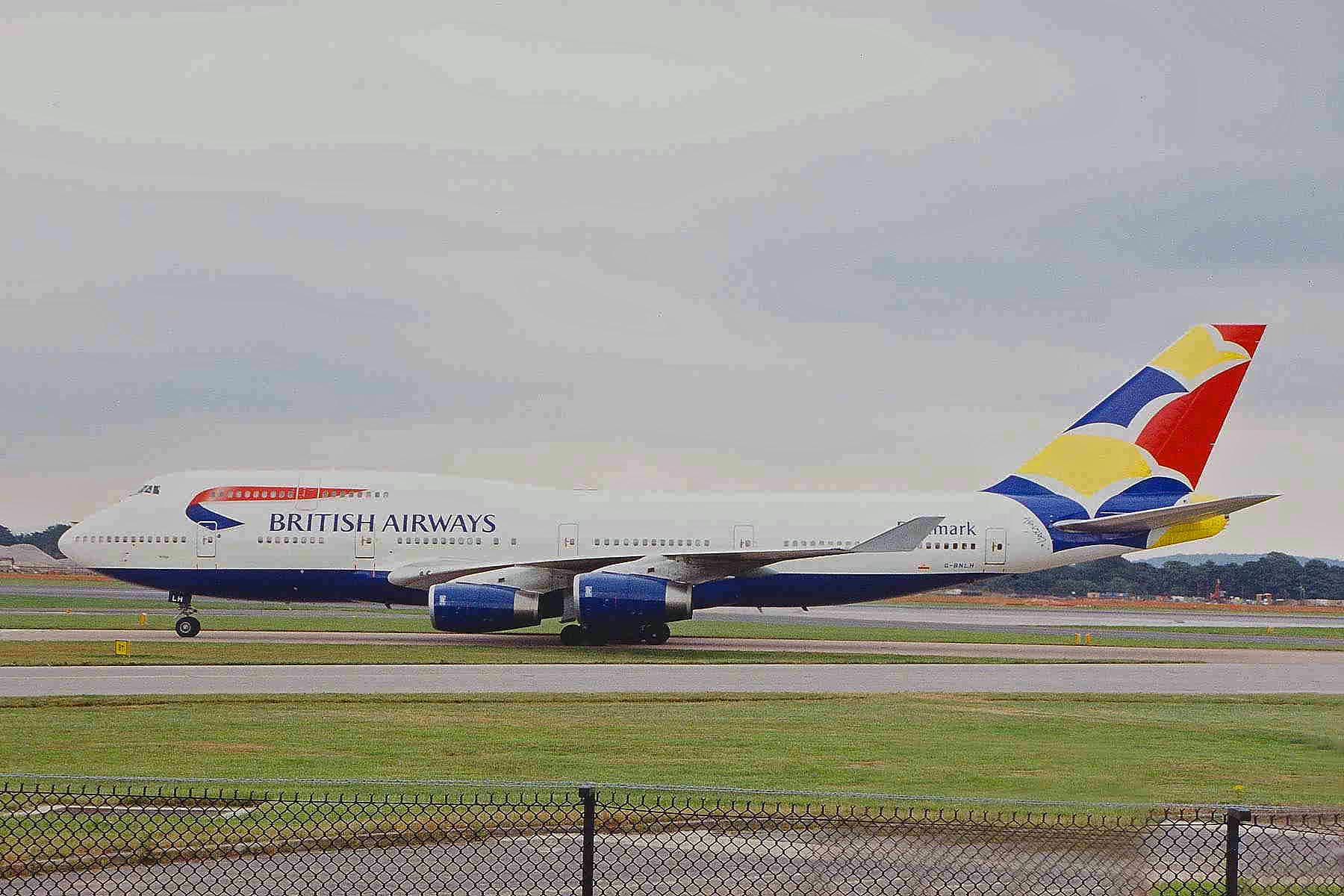
G-BNLH with Wings tail (1999)

A single 747-400 leased from British Airways to Qantas in 2000, registered as VH-NLH whilst operating in Australia (formerly G-BNLH), wore a hybrid livery complete with the Denmark Wings tail design. Under service with Qantas, the British Airways titles were removed and replaced with Qantas' own, but the remainder of the livery was left unchanged.

In May 2001 the new Chief Executive, Rod Eddington, announced the entire fleet would receive the new Union flag livery. The ethnic images would also be removed from baggage tags, menus, signage boarding passes and all company materials. Eddington argued that while an attempt to increase the airline's appeal was not a bad thing, the exercise had hurt the image of the carrier among its core customers – those that are attracted by the British identity. Eddington's opinions were echoed by Adam Hill, founder and partner of the advertising agency Designate, who stated that "name and logo are just small parts of the puzzle: to customers, the pride and heritage of this very British brand is what appeals, and swapping that out in order to appear modern and multicultural resulted in the very essence of the brand being diluted."

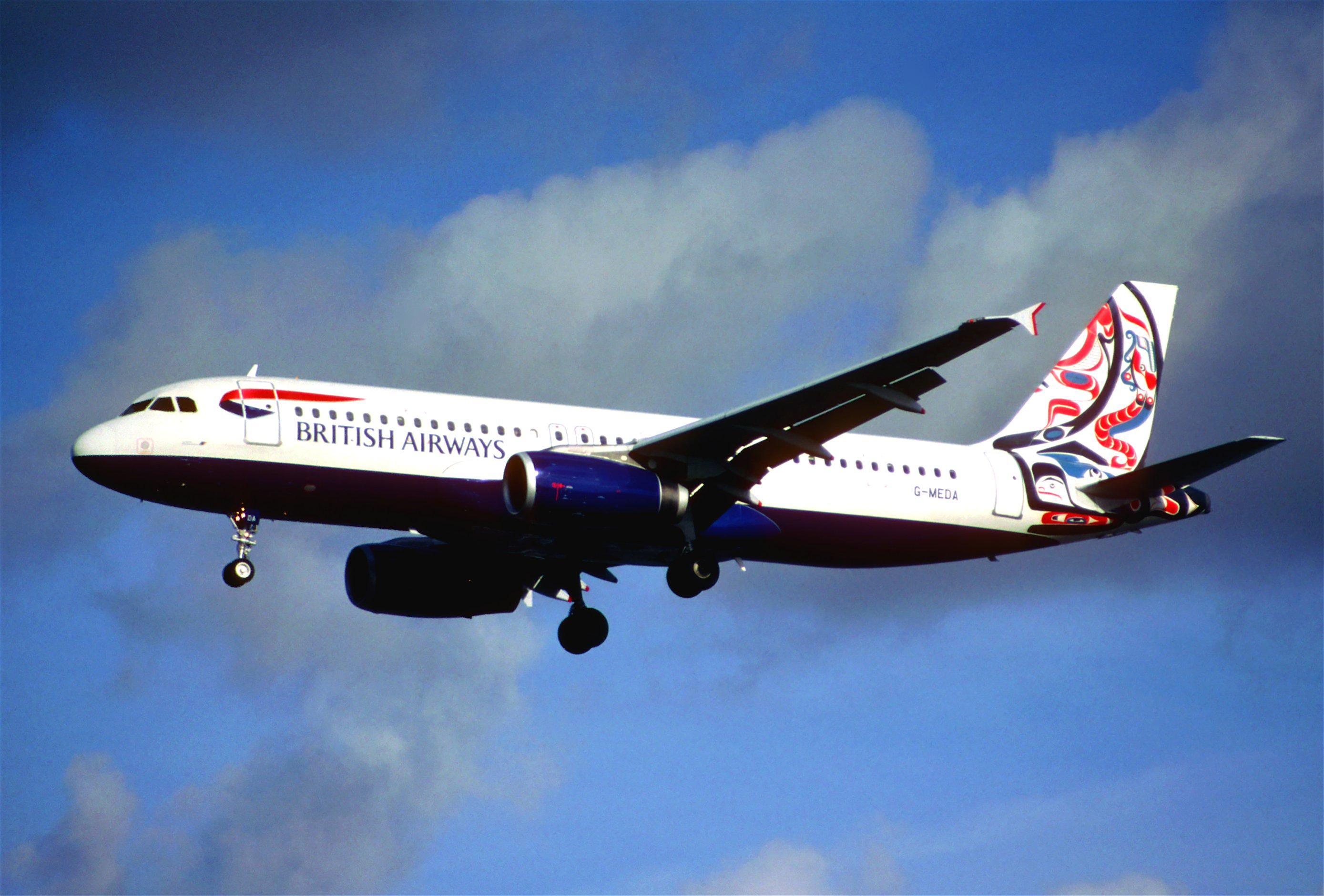
G-MEDA with Whale Rider (2001)

The final aircraft with a "Utopia" tail (Whale Rider) was retired in 2006, an Airbus A320-200 registered G-MEDA. Two Bombardier Dash 8 aircraft continued to operate with "Utopia" tails (G-BRYU, Benyhone Tartan; G-BRYV, Colum) for regional service until 2006, when both aircraft entered service for other airlines.

== World tail liveries ==
British Airways World Art tail liveries
Name	Artist	Summary	Origin	Aircraft	Reg. Nums	Qty	Image
Chatham Dockyard Union Flag (Note: Part of the original 15 designs introduced (the two designs from the Masanabo twins were counted as one, Ndebele).)		Introduced on Concorde. Revised version later adopted fleet-wide	United Kingdom	Concorde	G-BOAA, BOAB, BOAC, BOAD, BOAE, BOAF, BOAG	7	
Animals and trees (Kg'oocoan heé naka hìian theé e)	Cg'ose Ntcox'o	Artist is of the Ncoakhoe People of the Kalahari Desert; depicts seven jackals at an oasis.	Botswana	Boeing 747-400	G-BNLZ	8	
Animals and trees (Kg'oocoan heé naka hìian theé e)	Cg'ose Ntcox'o	Artist is of the Ncoakhoe People of the Kalahari Desert; depicts seven jackals at an oasis.	Botswana	Boeing 757-200	G-CPEL	8	
Animals and trees (Kg'oocoan heé naka hìian theé e)	Cg'ose Ntcox'o	Artist is of the Ncoakhoe People of the Kalahari Desert; depicts seven jackals at an oasis.	Botswana	Boeing 737-200	G-BGDT, ZS-SBR	8	
Animals and trees (Kg'oocoan heé naka hìian theé e)	Cg'ose Ntcox'o	Artist is of the Ncoakhoe People of the Kalahari Desert; depicts seven jackals at an oasis.	Botswana	Boeing 737-400	G-DOCD	8	
Animals and trees (Kg'oocoan heé naka hìian theé e)	Cg'ose Ntcox'o	Artist is of the Ncoakhoe People of the Kalahari Desert; depicts seven jackals at an oasis.	Botswana	Boeing 777-200	G-VIIK	8	
Animals and trees (Kg'oocoan heé naka hìian theé e)	Cg'ose Ntcox'o	Artist is of the Ncoakhoe People of the Kalahari Desert; depicts seven jackals at an oasis.	Botswana	ERJ-145	G-EMBD	8	
Animals and trees (Kg'oocoan heé naka hìian theé e)	Cg'ose Ntcox'o	Artist is of the Ncoakhoe People of the Kalahari Desert; depicts seven jackals at an oasis.	Botswana	Avro RJ100	G-BXAS	8	
Avignon	Jim Avignon	Contemporary German art	Germany	Boeing 737-300	D-ADBA, ADBB, ADBD, ADBI, ADBQ, ADBT, ADBU	7	
Bavaria (Edelweiss)		German art	Germany	Boeing 737-300	D-ADBH, ADBC, ADBF, ADBG	5	
Bavaria (Edelweiss)		German art	Germany	BAe 146-200	D-AMAJ	5	
Benyhone (Mountain of the Birds)	Peter MacDonald	Anglicised Gaelic for "Mountain of the Birds", a Scottish tartan design using colours from William Wilson & Son of Bannockburn. The livery is thought to be similar to Loganair's livery.	Scotland	Boeing 737-200	G-BGDL	25	
Benyhone (Mountain of the Birds)	Peter MacDonald	Anglicised Gaelic for "Mountain of the Birds", a Scottish tartan design using colours from William Wilson & Son of Bannockburn. The livery is thought to be similar to Loganair's livery.	Scotland	Boeing 737-400	G-BVNO, G-DOCA, DOCJ, DOCV	25	
Benyhone (Mountain of the Birds)	Peter MacDonald	Anglicised Gaelic for "Mountain of the Birds", a Scottish tartan design using colours from William Wilson & Son of Bannockburn. The livery is thought to be similar to Loganair's livery.	Scotland	Boeing 757-200	G-BIKL, BIKO	25	
Benyhone (Mountain of the Birds)	Peter MacDonald	Anglicised Gaelic for "Mountain of the Birds", a Scottish tartan design using colours from William Wilson & Son of Bannockburn. The livery is thought to be similar to Loganair's livery.	Scotland	Boeing 747-400	G-BNLI, G-CIVO, G-CIVW, G-CIVZ	25	
Benyhone (Mountain of the Birds)	Peter MacDonald	Anglicised Gaelic for "Mountain of the Birds", a Scottish tartan design using colours from William Wilson & Son of Bannockburn. The livery is thought to be similar to Loganair's livery.	Scotland	Boeing 767-300	G-BNWF, BNWT	25	
Benyhone (Mountain of the Birds)	Peter MacDonald	Anglicised Gaelic for "Mountain of the Birds", a Scottish tartan design using colours from William Wilson & Son of Bannockburn. The livery is thought to be similar to Loganair's livery.	Scotland	DHC8-300	G-BRYU,	25	
Benyhone (Mountain of the Birds)	Peter MacDonald	Anglicised Gaelic for "Mountain of the Birds", a Scottish tartan design using colours from William Wilson & Son of Bannockburn. The livery is thought to be similar to Loganair's livery.	Scotland	Airbus A320-100	G-BUSE	25	
Benyhone (Mountain of the Birds)	Peter MacDonald	Anglicised Gaelic for "Mountain of the Birds", a Scottish tartan design using colours from William Wilson & Son of Bannockburn. The livery is thought to be similar to Loganair's livery.	Scotland	British Aerospace ATP	G-BUYW, OY-SVI	25	
Benyhone (Mountain of the Birds)	Peter MacDonald	Anglicised Gaelic for "Mountain of the Birds", a Scottish tartan design using colours from William Wilson & Son of Bannockburn. The livery is thought to be similar to Loganair's livery.	Scotland	ERJ-145	G-EMBK	25	
Benyhone (Mountain of the Birds)	Peter MacDonald	Anglicised Gaelic for "Mountain of the Birds", a Scottish tartan design using colours from William Wilson & Son of Bannockburn. The livery is thought to be similar to Loganair's livery.	Scotland	Boeing 777-200	G-VIIJ, VIIR	25	
Benyhone (Mountain of the Birds)	Peter MacDonald	Anglicised Gaelic for "Mountain of the Birds", a Scottish tartan design using colours from William Wilson & Son of Bannockburn. The livery is thought to be similar to Loganair's livery.	Scotland	ATR72-200	G-BWTM	25	
Benyhone (Mountain of the Birds)	Peter MacDonald	Anglicised Gaelic for "Mountain of the Birds", a Scottish tartan design using colours from William Wilson & Son of Bannockburn. The livery is thought to be similar to Loganair's livery.	Scotland	Boeing 727-200	ZS-OBO	25	
Benyhone (Mountain of the Birds)	Peter MacDonald	Anglicised Gaelic for "Mountain of the Birds", a Scottish tartan design using colours from William Wilson & Son of Bannockburn. The livery is thought to be similar to Loganair's livery.	Scotland	BAe 146-200	G-GNTZ	25	
Benyhone (Mountain of the Birds)	Peter MacDonald	Anglicised Gaelic for "Mountain of the Birds", a Scottish tartan design using colours from William Wilson & Son of Bannockburn. The livery is thought to be similar to Loganair's livery.	Scotland	BN-2 Islander	G-BLDV	25	
Benyhone (Mountain of the Birds)	Peter MacDonald	Anglicised Gaelic for "Mountain of the Birds", a Scottish tartan design using colours from William Wilson & Son of Bannockburn. The livery is thought to be similar to Loganair's livery.	Scotland	Saab 340	G-GNTE, LGNA	25	
Benyhone (Mountain of the Birds)	Peter MacDonald	Anglicised Gaelic for "Mountain of the Birds", a Scottish tartan design using colours from William Wilson & Son of Bannockburn. The livery is thought to be similar to Loganair's livery.	Scotland	Short 360	G-BPFN	25	
Blomsteräng (Flower Field)	Ulrica Hydman Vallien	Artist works for a glassware manufacturer in Småland. This design is taken from a large glass bowl with a hearts and flowers theme.	Sweden	Boeing 747-200	G-BDXG	7	
Blomsteräng (Flower Field)	Ulrica Hydman Vallien	Artist works for a glassware manufacturer in Småland. This design is taken from a large glass bowl with a hearts and flowers theme.	Sweden	Boeing 757-200	G-BMRI	7	
Blomsteräng (Flower Field)	Ulrica Hydman Vallien	Artist works for a glassware manufacturer in Småland. This design is taken from a large glass bowl with a hearts and flowers theme.	Sweden	Boeing 767-300	G-BNWU	7	
Blomsteräng (Flower Field)	Ulrica Hydman Vallien	Artist works for a glassware manufacturer in Småland. This design is taken from a large glass bowl with a hearts and flowers theme.	Sweden	Boeing 737-400	G-DOCE	7	
Blomsteräng (Flower Field)	Ulrica Hydman Vallien	Artist works for a glassware manufacturer in Småland. This design is taken from a large glass bowl with a hearts and flowers theme.	Sweden	ERJ-145	G-EMBH	7	
Blomsteräng (Flower Field)	Ulrica Hydman Vallien	Artist works for a glassware manufacturer in Småland. This design is taken from a large glass bowl with a hearts and flowers theme.	Sweden	Boeing 727-200	ZS-NOU	7	
Blomsteräng (Flower Field)	Ulrica Hydman Vallien	Artist works for a glassware manufacturer in Småland. This design is taken from a large glass bowl with a hearts and flowers theme.	Sweden	BAe Jetstream 31	OY-SVJ	7	
Blue Poole	Sally Tuffin	Taken from a dish and vase designed by Tuffin for Poole.	England	Boeing 747-200	G-BDXD	9	
Blue Poole	Sally Tuffin	Taken from a dish and vase designed by Tuffin for Poole.	England	Boeing 757-200	G-BIKA, CPEM	9	
Blue Poole	Sally Tuffin	Taken from a dish and vase designed by Tuffin for Poole.	England	Boeing 737-200	G-BKYB, ZS-NNH	9	
Blue Poole	Sally Tuffin	Taken from a dish and vase designed by Tuffin for Poole.	England	Boeing 737-400	G-DOCC, TREN	9	
Blue Poole	Sally Tuffin	Taken from a dish and vase designed by Tuffin for Poole.	England	British Aerospace ATP	G-MAUD	9	
Blue Poole	Sally Tuffin	Taken from a dish and vase designed by Tuffin for Poole.	England	Boeing 737-500	G-MSKA	9	
British Blend	Simon Balwin	Coffee cup design, result of New Britain competition, used on a single A320, G-BUSI	United Kingdom	Airbus A320-200	G-BUSI	1	
British Olympic Team (Teaming up for Britain)	Mark Pickthall	Adopted for 2000 Summer Olympics, features British Olympic Association lion logo designed by Pickthall for Ion River Design.	United Kingdom	Boeing 737-200	G-BKYG	3	
British Olympic Team (Teaming up for Britain)	Mark Pickthall	Adopted for 2000 Summer Olympics, features British Olympic Association lion logo designed by Pickthall for Ion River Design.	United Kingdom	Boeing 757-200	G-BMRC	3	
British Olympic Team (Teaming up for Britain)	Mark Pickthall	Adopted for 2000 Summer Olympics, features British Olympic Association lion logo designed by Pickthall for Ion River Design.	United Kingdom	Airbus A320-100	G-BUSC	3	
Chelsea Rose	Pierce Casey	Representation of the English rose, based on visits by Casey to parks and gardens in Chelsea and Battersea. Carried by both 'British Asia Airways' Boeing 747-436s whilst in service with those titles.	England	Boeing 737-400	G-DOCG, DOCQ, BNNL	23	
Chelsea Rose	Pierce Casey	Representation of the English rose, based on visits by Casey to parks and gardens in Chelsea and Battersea. Carried by both 'British Asia Airways' Boeing 747-436s whilst in service with those titles.	England	Boeing 747-200	G-BDXK	23	
Chelsea Rose	Pierce Casey	Representation of the English rose, based on visits by Casey to parks and gardens in Chelsea and Battersea. Carried by both 'British Asia Airways' Boeing 747-436s whilst in service with those titles.	England	Boeing 757-200	G-BIKB, BMRD	23	
Chelsea Rose	Pierce Casey	Representation of the English rose, based on visits by Casey to parks and gardens in Chelsea and Battersea. Carried by both 'British Asia Airways' Boeing 747-436s whilst in service with those titles.	England	Boeing 747-400	G-BNLA, BNLL, BYGA, BYGC, BYGF, CIVA, CIVB, N495MC	23	
Chelsea Rose	Pierce Casey	Representation of the English rose, based on visits by Casey to parks and gardens in Chelsea and Battersea. Carried by both 'British Asia Airways' Boeing 747-436s whilst in service with those titles.	England	Boeing 767-300	G-BNWB, BNWE, BNWR	23	
Chelsea Rose	Pierce Casey	Representation of the English rose, based on visits by Casey to parks and gardens in Chelsea and Battersea. Carried by both 'British Asia Airways' Boeing 747-436s whilst in service with those titles.	England	DHC8-300	G-BRYI	23	
Chelsea Rose	Pierce Casey	Representation of the English rose, based on visits by Casey to parks and gardens in Chelsea and Battersea. Carried by both 'British Asia Airways' Boeing 747-436s whilst in service with those titles.	England	ATR72-200	G-BVTK	23	
Chelsea Rose	Pierce Casey	Representation of the English rose, based on visits by Casey to parks and gardens in Chelsea and Battersea. Carried by both 'British Asia Airways' Boeing 747-436s whilst in service with those titles.	England	Avro RJ100	G-BZAV	23	
Chelsea Rose	Pierce Casey	Representation of the English rose, based on visits by Casey to parks and gardens in Chelsea and Battersea. Carried by both 'British Asia Airways' Boeing 747-436s whilst in service with those titles.	England	BAe Jetstream 41	G-MAJL	23	
Chelsea Rose	Pierce Casey	Representation of the English rose, based on visits by Casey to parks and gardens in Chelsea and Battersea. Carried by both 'British Asia Airways' Boeing 747-436s whilst in service with those titles.	England	Bombardier CRJ200	G-MSKN	23	
Chelsea Rose	Pierce Casey	Representation of the English rose, based on visits by Casey to parks and gardens in Chelsea and Battersea. Carried by both 'British Asia Airways' Boeing 747-436s whilst in service with those titles.	England	Boeing 777-200	G-VIIO, VIIS	23	
Colour Down the Side	Terry Frost	Abstract Cornish painting by Frost in 1968. Used on a single Dash 8 of Brymon Airways (BA Citiexpress)	England	DHC8-300	G-BRYT	1	
Colum (Dove)	Timothy O'Neill	Anglicised Irish for "Dove": a Celtic design to evoke the memory of St Columba.	Ireland	Boeing 737-200	G-BGDR	24	
Colum (Dove)	Timothy O'Neill	Anglicised Irish for "Dove": a Celtic design to evoke the memory of St Columba.	Ireland	Boeing 747-400	G-BNLC, BYGB, CIVP	24	
Colum (Dove)	Timothy O'Neill	Anglicised Irish for "Dove": a Celtic design to evoke the memory of St Columba.	Ireland	Boeing 767-300	G-BNWK, BNWV	24	
Colum (Dove)	Timothy O'Neill	Anglicised Irish for "Dove": a Celtic design to evoke the memory of St Columba.	Ireland	DHC8-300	G-BRYV	24	
Colum (Dove)	Timothy O'Neill	Anglicised Irish for "Dove": a Celtic design to evoke the memory of St Columba.	Ireland	Avro RJ100	G-BZAU	24	
Colum (Dove)	Timothy O'Neill	Anglicised Irish for "Dove": a Celtic design to evoke the memory of St Columba.	Ireland	ATR72-200	G-BYTP	24	
Colum (Dove)	Timothy O'Neill	Anglicised Irish for "Dove": a Celtic design to evoke the memory of St Columba.	Ireland	Boeing 727-200	ZS-NZV	24	
Colum (Dove)	Timothy O'Neill	Anglicised Irish for "Dove": a Celtic design to evoke the memory of St Columba.	Ireland	Boeing 757-200	G-CPEP	24	
Colum (Dove)	Timothy O'Neill	Anglicised Irish for "Dove": a Celtic design to evoke the memory of St Columba.	Ireland	ERJ145	G-EMBA	24	
Colum (Dove)	Timothy O'Neill	Anglicised Irish for "Dove": a Celtic design to evoke the memory of St Columba.	Ireland	BAe Jetstream 31	OY-SVO	24	
Colum (Dove)	Timothy O'Neill	Anglicised Irish for "Dove": a Celtic design to evoke the memory of St Columba.	Ireland	BAe Jetstream 41	G-MAJC	24	
Colum (Dove)	Timothy O'Neill	Anglicised Irish for "Dove": a Celtic design to evoke the memory of St Columba.	Ireland	Boeing 737-300	G-OGBB, OMUC	24	
Colum (Dove)	Timothy O'Neill	Anglicised Irish for "Dove": a Celtic design to evoke the memory of St Columba.	Ireland	Boeing 737-400	G-DOCX	24	
Colum (Dove)	Timothy O'Neill	Anglicised Irish for "Dove": a Celtic design to evoke the memory of St Columba.	Ireland	Boeing 737-500	G-MSKB	24	
Colum (Dove)	Timothy O'Neill	Anglicised Irish for "Dove": a Celtic design to evoke the memory of St Columba.	Ireland	Boeing 777-200	G-VIIP	24	
Colum (Dove)	Timothy O'Neill	Anglicised Irish for "Dove": a Celtic design to evoke the memory of St Columba.	Ireland	British Aerospace ATP	OY-SVT	24	
Colum (Dove)	Timothy O'Neill	Anglicised Irish for "Dove": a Celtic design to evoke the memory of St Columba.	Ireland	BN-2 Islander	G-BJOP	24	
Colum (Dove)	Timothy O'Neill	Anglicised Irish for "Dove": a Celtic design to evoke the memory of St Columba.	Ireland	Short 360	G-BNMU	24	
Crossing Borders (عبر الحدود)	Chant Avedissian	Reuse of Islamic and Pharaonic images and colour based on the decorations of the tentmakers of Cairo.	Egypt	Boeing 757-200	G-BIKT	5	
Crossing Borders (عبر الحدود)	Chant Avedissian	Reuse of Islamic and Pharaonic images and colour based on the decorations of the tentmakers of Cairo.	Egypt	Boeing 737-400	G-DOCT	5	
Crossing Borders (عبر الحدود)	Chant Avedissian	Reuse of Islamic and Pharaonic images and colour based on the decorations of the tentmakers of Cairo.	Egypt	Boeing 737-300	G-OGBE	5	
Crossing Borders (عبر الحدود)	Chant Avedissian	Reuse of Islamic and Pharaonic images and colour based on the decorations of the tentmakers of Cairo.	Egypt	Bombardier CRJ200	G-MSKO	5	
Crossing Borders (عبر الحدود)	Chant Avedissian	Reuse of Islamic and Pharaonic images and colour based on the decorations of the tentmakers of Cairo.	Egypt	Airbus A320-200	G-MEDD	5	
Delftblue Daybreak (Delftsblauwe Dageraad)	Hugo Kaagman	Delft pottery design. Uses "the traditions of the past and [modernises] them for the future."	Netherlands	Boeing 737-200	G-BGDF	16	
Delftblue Daybreak (Delftsblauwe Dageraad)	Hugo Kaagman	Delft pottery design. Uses "the traditions of the past and [modernises] them for the future."	Netherlands	Boeing 757-200	G-BIKX	16	
Delftblue Daybreak (Delftsblauwe Dageraad)	Hugo Kaagman	Delft pottery design. Uses "the traditions of the past and [modernises] them for the future."	Netherlands	Boeing 747-400	G-BNLD, CIVC, CIVN, CIVT	16	
Delftblue Daybreak (Delftsblauwe Dageraad)	Hugo Kaagman	Delft pottery design. Uses "the traditions of the past and [modernises] them for the future."	Netherlands	Boeing 767-300	G-BNWA, BZHB	16	
Delftblue Daybreak (Delftsblauwe Dageraad)	Hugo Kaagman	Delft pottery design. Uses "the traditions of the past and [modernises] them for the future."	Netherlands	Avro RJ100	G-BXAR	16	
Delftblue Daybreak (Delftsblauwe Dageraad)	Hugo Kaagman	Delft pottery design. Uses "the traditions of the past and [modernises] them for the future."	Netherlands	Boeing 737-500	G-MSKE	16	
Delftblue Daybreak (Delftsblauwe Dageraad)	Hugo Kaagman	Delft pottery design. Uses "the traditions of the past and [modernises] them for the future."	Netherlands	Boeing 737-300	G-OHAJ	16	
Delftblue Daybreak (Delftsblauwe Dageraad)	Hugo Kaagman	Delft pottery design. Uses "the traditions of the past and [modernises] them for the future."	Netherlands	Boeing 777-200	G-RAES, VIIU	16	
Delftblue Daybreak (Delftsblauwe Dageraad)	Hugo Kaagman	Delft pottery design. Uses "the traditions of the past and [modernises] them for the future."	Netherlands	Boeing 727-200	ZS-NOV	16	
Delftblue Daybreak (Delftsblauwe Dageraad)	Hugo Kaagman	Delft pottery design. Uses "the traditions of the past and [modernises] them for the future."	Netherlands	BAe Jetstream 41	PH-KJG	16	
Delftblue Daybreak (Delftsblauwe Dageraad)	Hugo Kaagman	Delft pottery design. Uses "the traditions of the past and [modernises] them for the future."	Netherlands	Short 360	G-BNMW	16	
Golden Khokhloma	Taisia Akimovna Belyantzeva	Officially Kudrina from Semenov (Семёновская кудрина). Based on painted khokhloma decoration on tableware set by Belyantzeva in 1978.	Russia	Boeing 757-200	G-BIKH	3	
Golden Khokhloma	Taisia Akimovna Belyantzeva	Officially Kudrina from Semenov (Семёновская кудрина). Based on painted khokhloma decoration on tableware set by Belyantzeva in 1978.	Russia	Boeing 737-300	G-XMAN	3	
Golden Khokhloma	Taisia Akimovna Belyantzeva	Officially Kudrina from Semenov (Семёновская кудрина). Based on painted khokhloma decoration on tableware set by Belyantzeva in 1978.	Russia	Boeing 767-300	G-BNWJ	3	
Gothic (Calligraphy)		German art	Germany	Boeing 737-300	D-ADBM, ADBN, ADBO, ADBP	4	
Grand Union	Christine Bass	Result of a Sunday Times competition. Based on traditional English canal boat art from walks Bass has taken with her family along the Grand Union Canal in Buckinghamshire.	United Kingdom	Boeing 757-200	G-BMRJ	6	
Grand Union	Christine Bass	Result of a Sunday Times competition. Based on traditional English canal boat art from walks Bass has taken with her family along the Grand Union Canal in Buckinghamshire.	United Kingdom	DHC8-300	G-BRYP	6	
Grand Union	Christine Bass	Result of a Sunday Times competition. Based on traditional English canal boat art from walks Bass has taken with her family along the Grand Union Canal in Buckinghamshire.	United Kingdom	Boeing 737-300	G-XBHX	6	
Grand Union	Christine Bass	Result of a Sunday Times competition. Based on traditional English canal boat art from walks Bass has taken with her family along the Grand Union Canal in Buckinghamshire.	United Kingdom	Boeing 737-400	G-DOCH	6	
Grand Union	Christine Bass	Result of a Sunday Times competition. Based on traditional English canal boat art from walks Bass has taken with her family along the Grand Union Canal in Buckinghamshire.	United Kingdom	ERJ-145	G-EMBF	6	
Kogutki Łowickie	Danuta Wojda	Sometimes spelled Koguty Łowickie, meaning Cockerel of Łowicz. Based on paper cut-out of cockerels, peacocks and flower. Unique variant "Flowers of Mazowsze" applied to G-OGBC	Poland	Boeing 747-400	G-BNLT	10	
Kogutki Łowickie	Danuta Wojda	Sometimes spelled Koguty Łowickie, meaning Cockerel of Łowicz. Based on paper cut-out of cockerels, peacocks and flower. Unique variant "Flowers of Mazowsze" applied to G-OGBC	Poland	Boeing 757-200	G-BPED	10	
Kogutki Łowickie	Danuta Wojda	Sometimes spelled Koguty Łowickie, meaning Cockerel of Łowicz. Based on paper cut-out of cockerels, peacocks and flower. Unique variant "Flowers of Mazowsze" applied to G-OGBC	Poland	DHC8-300	G-BRYW	10	
Kogutki Łowickie	Danuta Wojda	Sometimes spelled Koguty Łowickie, meaning Cockerel of Łowicz. Based on paper cut-out of cockerels, peacocks and flower. Unique variant "Flowers of Mazowsze" applied to G-OGBC	Poland	Boeing 737-200	G-BGDG, ZS-SBO	10	
Kogutki Łowickie	Danuta Wojda	Sometimes spelled Koguty Łowickie, meaning Cockerel of Łowicz. Based on paper cut-out of cockerels, peacocks and flower. Unique variant "Flowers of Mazowsze" applied to G-OGBC	Poland	Boeing 737-300	G-OGBC	10	
Kogutki Łowickie	Danuta Wojda	Sometimes spelled Koguty Łowickie, meaning Cockerel of Łowicz. Based on paper cut-out of cockerels, peacocks and flower. Unique variant "Flowers of Mazowsze" applied to G-OGBC	Poland	Boeing 737-400	G-DOCF	10	
Kogutki Łowickie	Danuta Wojda	Sometimes spelled Koguty Łowickie, meaning Cockerel of Łowicz. Based on paper cut-out of cockerels, peacocks and flower. Unique variant "Flowers of Mazowsze" applied to G-OGBC	Poland	Airbus A320-100	G-BUSB	10	
Kogutki Łowickie	Danuta Wojda	Sometimes spelled Koguty Łowickie, meaning Cockerel of Łowicz. Based on paper cut-out of cockerels, peacocks and flower. Unique variant "Flowers of Mazowsze" applied to G-OGBC	Poland	ERJ-145	G-EMBC	10	
Kogutki Łowickie	Danuta Wojda	Sometimes spelled Koguty Łowickie, meaning Cockerel of Łowicz. Based on paper cut-out of cockerels, peacocks and flower. Unique variant "Flowers of Mazowsze" applied to G-OGBC	Poland	Short 360	G-BNMT	10	
L'esprit Liberté		Celebrating human rights movement	International	Fokker 100	F-GIOI, GIOG	12	
L'esprit Liberté		Celebrating human rights movement	International	Douglas DC-10	F-GPVA	12	
L'esprit Liberté		Celebrating human rights movement	International	McDonnell Douglas MD-83	F-GFZB, GHEB, GRML	12	
La Pyramide du Louvre		One aircraft painted with image of central courtyard of Louvre museum	France	McDonnell Douglas MD-83	F-GPZA	1	
Nalanji Dreaming	The Balarinji Design Studio	Aboriginal art, originally designed in 1995 for Qantas and painted on a B747-300 aircraft (VH-EBU). Nalanji means "our place". Environmental preservation theme.	Australia	Boeing 757-200	G-BMRH	2	
Nalanji Dreaming	The Balarinji Design Studio	Aboriginal art, originally designed in 1995 for Qantas and painted on a B747-300 aircraft (VH-EBU). Nalanji means "our place". Environmental preservation theme.	Australia	Boeing 747-400	G-BNLN	2	
Ndebele Emmly	Emmly Masanabo	Officially named Emmly Masanabo after the artist, who is of the Ndebele people. Based on a panel decorated with beads and mural-style painting; a similar panel was produced by the artist's twin sister Martha, commonly known as Ndebele Martha.	South Africa	Boeing 757-200	G-BIKC	3	
Ndebele Emmly	Emmly Masanabo	Officially named Emmly Masanabo after the artist, who is of the Ndebele people. Based on a panel decorated with beads and mural-style painting; a similar panel was produced by the artist's twin sister Martha, commonly known as Ndebele Martha.	South Africa	Boeing 747-400	G-BNLO	3	
Ndebele Emmly	Emmly Masanabo	Officially named Emmly Masanabo after the artist, who is of the Ndebele people. Based on a panel decorated with beads and mural-style painting; a similar panel was produced by the artist's twin sister Martha, commonly known as Ndebele Martha.	South Africa	Boeing 767-300	G-BNWD	3	
Ndebele Emmly	Emmly Masanabo	Officially named Emmly Masanabo after the artist, who is of the Ndebele people. Based on a panel decorated with beads and mural-style painting; a similar panel was produced by the artist's twin sister Martha, commonly known as Ndebele Martha.	South Africa	Bombardier CRJ200	G-MSKL	3	
Ndebele Martha	Martha Masanabo	Officially named Martha Masanabo after the artist, who is of the Ndebele people. Based on a panel decorated with beads and mural-style painting; a similar panel was produced by the artist's twin sister Emmly, commonly known as Ndebele Emmly.	South Africa	Boeing 757-200	G-BIKW	13	
Ndebele Martha	Martha Masanabo	Officially named Martha Masanabo after the artist, who is of the Ndebele people. Based on a panel decorated with beads and mural-style painting; a similar panel was produced by the artist's twin sister Emmly, commonly known as Ndebele Emmly.	South Africa	Boeing 747-400	G-BNLJ, BNLM	13	
Ndebele Martha	Martha Masanabo	Officially named Martha Masanabo after the artist, who is of the Ndebele people. Based on a panel decorated with beads and mural-style painting; a similar panel was produced by the artist's twin sister Emmly, commonly known as Ndebele Emmly.	South Africa	Boeing 737-200	G-BGDA, ZS-SBN	13	
Ndebele Martha	Martha Masanabo	Officially named Martha Masanabo after the artist, who is of the Ndebele people. Based on a panel decorated with beads and mural-style painting; a similar panel was produced by the artist's twin sister Emmly, commonly known as Ndebele Emmly.	South Africa	Boeing 737-300	G-OGBD	13	
Ndebele Martha	Martha Masanabo	Officially named Martha Masanabo after the artist, who is of the Ndebele people. Based on a panel decorated with beads and mural-style painting; a similar panel was produced by the artist's twin sister Emmly, commonly known as Ndebele Emmly.	South Africa	Boeing 737-400	G-DOCU, DOCL	13	
Ndebele Martha	Martha Masanabo	Officially named Martha Masanabo after the artist, who is of the Ndebele people. Based on a panel decorated with beads and mural-style painting; a similar panel was produced by the artist's twin sister Emmly, commonly known as Ndebele Emmly.	South Africa	BAe Jetstream 41	G-MAJB, MSKJ, OY-SVS	13	
Paithani (पैठणी)	Meera Mehta	Based on a sari designed by Mehta using traditional motifs from the textile industry in Paithan. Features 'asavari' creeper border with flowering shrubs and parrots.	India	Boeing 747-200	G-BDXO	3	
Paithani (पैठणी)	Meera Mehta	Based on a sari designed by Mehta using traditional motifs from the textile industry in Paithan. Features 'asavari' creeper border with flowering shrubs and parrots.	India	Boeing 757-200	G-BMRA	3	
Paithani (पैठणी)	Meera Mehta	Based on a sari designed by Mehta using traditional motifs from the textile industry in Paithan. Features 'asavari' creeper border with flowering shrubs and parrots.	India	ERJ-145	G-EMBI	3	
Pause to remember		Poppy design, used around Remembrance Day. Now applied to fuselage.	United Kingdom	Boeing 757-200	G-BIKW, BMRB	3	
Pause to remember		Poppy design, used around Remembrance Day. Now applied to fuselage.	United Kingdom	Boeing 737-200	G-BKYG	3	
Pause to remember		Poppy design, used around Remembrance Day. Now applied to fuselage.	United Kingdom	Boeing 737-400	G-BVNM	3	
Rendezvous (约会)	Yip Man-Yam	Chinese calligraphy of a poem describing water boiling.	Hong Kong	Boeing 737-200	G-BGJE	22	
Rendezvous (约会)	Yip Man-Yam	Chinese calligraphy of a poem describing water boiling.	Hong Kong	Boeing 737-300	G-OAMS	22	
Rendezvous (约会)	Yip Man-Yam	Chinese calligraphy of a poem describing water boiling.	Hong Kong	Boeing 737-400	G-DOCM, DOCW	22	
Rendezvous (约会)	Yip Man-Yam	Chinese calligraphy of a poem describing water boiling.	Hong Kong	Boeing 747-400	G-BYGE, BYGD, BYGG, BNLR, CIVV	22	
Rendezvous (约会)	Yip Man-Yam	Chinese calligraphy of a poem describing water boiling.	Hong Kong	Boeing 757-200	G-BIKI, BIKN, BMRE, BMRG, CPEU, CPEV	22	
Rendezvous (约会)	Yip Man-Yam	Chinese calligraphy of a poem describing water boiling.	Hong Kong	Boeing 767-300	G-BNWC, BNWP	22	
Rendezvous (约会)	Yip Man-Yam	Chinese calligraphy of a poem describing water boiling.	Hong Kong	Boeing 777-200	G-VIIT, ZZZC	22	
Rendezvous (约会)	Yip Man-Yam	Chinese calligraphy of a poem describing water boiling.	Hong Kong	DHC8-300	G-BRYY	22	
Rendezvous (约会)	Yip Man-Yam	Chinese calligraphy of a poem describing water boiling.	Hong Kong	British Aerospace ATP	G-MANO	22	
Rendezvous (约会)	Yip Man-Yam	Chinese calligraphy of a poem describing water boiling.	Hong Kong	Airbus A320-200	G-MEDB	22	
Rendezvous (约会)	Yip Man-Yam	Chinese calligraphy of a poem describing water boiling.	Hong Kong	BAe Jetstream 31	OY-SVZ, OY-SVP	22	
Spring (Primăvară)	Morag Dumetru	Images of Romania. Winner of employee contest.	Romania	Boeing 757-200	G-BIKY	1	
Sterntaler (Bauhaus)	Antje Brüggemann	Based on 3-D 'ceramic objects' art.	Germany	Boeing 757-200	G-CPET	14	
Sterntaler (Bauhaus)	Antje Brüggemann	Based on 3-D 'ceramic objects' art.	Germany	Boeing 737-200	G-BGDE	14	
Sterntaler (Bauhaus)	Antje Brüggemann	Based on 3-D 'ceramic objects' art.	Germany	Boeing 737-300	G-OFRA, D-ADBK, ADBL, ADBE, ADBR, ADBS, ADBV, ADBW, ZS-NNG	14	
Sterntaler (Bauhaus)	Antje Brüggemann	Based on 3-D 'ceramic objects' art.	Germany	Airbus A320-200	G-BUSG	14	
Sterntaler (Bauhaus)	Antje Brüggemann	Based on 3-D 'ceramic objects' art.	Germany	Bombardier CRJ200	G-MSKM	14	
Sterntaler (Bauhaus)	Antje Brüggemann	Based on 3-D 'ceramic objects' art.	Germany	ERJ-145	G-EMBB	14	
Water Dreaming (Ngapa Jukurrpa)	Clifford Possum Tjapaltjarri	Art representing northern Australian terrain.	Australia	Boeing 747-400	G-BNLK	4	
Water Dreaming (Ngapa Jukurrpa)	Clifford Possum Tjapaltjarri	Art representing northern Australian terrain.	Australia	Boeing 737-200	G-BKYE	4	
Water Dreaming (Ngapa Jukurrpa)	Clifford Possum Tjapaltjarri	Art representing northern Australian terrain.	Australia	Boeing 757-200	G-BMRF	4	
Water Dreaming (Ngapa Jukurrpa)	Clifford Possum Tjapaltjarri	Art representing northern Australian terrain.	Australia	Airbus A320-200	G-BUSJ	4	
Water Dreaming (Ngapa Jukurrpa)	Clifford Possum Tjapaltjarri	Art representing northern Australian terrain.	Australia	ERJ-145	G-EMBG	4	
Waves and Cranes (波と鶴)	Matazō Kayama	Also known as Nami Tsuru. Nihonga painting of waves and cranes, symbolising the cosmic world and the soul of Japan.	Japan	Boeing 767-300	G-BZHC	13	
Waves and Cranes (波と鶴)	Matazō Kayama	Also known as Nami Tsuru. Nihonga painting of waves and cranes, symbolising the cosmic world and the soul of Japan.	Japan	Boeing 747-400	G-CIVM, CIVR, CIVX	13	
Waves and Cranes (波と鶴)	Matazō Kayama	Also known as Nami Tsuru. Nihonga painting of waves and cranes, symbolising the cosmic world and the soul of Japan.	Japan	Boeing 737-200	G-BGDJ, BKYP, ZS-NLN	13	
Waves and Cranes (波と鶴)	Matazō Kayama	Also known as Nami Tsuru. Nihonga painting of waves and cranes, symbolising the cosmic world and the soul of Japan.	Japan	Boeing 737-300	G-ODUS	13	
Waves and Cranes (波と鶴)	Matazō Kayama	Also known as Nami Tsuru. Nihonga painting of waves and cranes, symbolising the cosmic world and the soul of Japan.	Japan	Boeing 737-400	G-OGBA	13	
Waves and Cranes (波と鶴)	Matazō Kayama	Also known as Nami Tsuru. Nihonga painting of waves and cranes, symbolising the cosmic world and the soul of Japan.	Japan	Boeing 757-200	G-BPEC	13	
Waves and Cranes (波と鶴)	Matazō Kayama	Also known as Nami Tsuru. Nihonga painting of waves and cranes, symbolising the cosmic world and the soul of Japan.	Japan	Boeing 777-200	G-VIIM	13	
Waves and Cranes (波と鶴)	Matazō Kayama	Also known as Nami Tsuru. Nihonga painting of waves and cranes, symbolising the cosmic world and the soul of Japan.	Japan	Airbus A320-100	G-BUSK	13	
Waves and Cranes (波と鶴)	Matazō Kayama	Also known as Nami Tsuru. Nihonga painting of waves and cranes, symbolising the cosmic world and the soul of Japan.	Japan	ATR72-200	G-BVTJ	13	
Waves of the City	Jenifer Kobylarz	Simple and modern abstract art meant to "convey a sense of frozen motion."	United States	Boeing 757-200	G-BIKJ	13	
Waves of the City	Jenifer Kobylarz	Simple and modern abstract art meant to "convey a sense of frozen motion."	United States	DHC8-300	G-BRYS	13	
Waves of the City	Jenifer Kobylarz	Simple and modern abstract art meant to "convey a sense of frozen motion."	United States	Boeing 737-400	G-DOCR, BNNK	13	
Waves of the City	Jenifer Kobylarz	Simple and modern abstract art meant to "convey a sense of frozen motion."	United States	Boeing 737-500	G-MSKC	13	
Waves of the City	Jenifer Kobylarz	Simple and modern abstract art meant to "convey a sense of frozen motion."	United States	Boeing 747-400	G-BNLV, BNLX	13	
Waves of the City	Jenifer Kobylarz	Simple and modern abstract art meant to "convey a sense of frozen motion."	United States	Boeing 767-300	G-BNWG, BNWH	13	
Waves of the City	Jenifer Kobylarz	Simple and modern abstract art meant to "convey a sense of frozen motion."	United States	Boeing 777-200	G-VIIA	13	
Waves of the City	Jenifer Kobylarz	Simple and modern abstract art meant to "convey a sense of frozen motion."	United States	BAe Jetstream 31	OY-SVR	13	
Waves of the City	Jenifer Kobylarz	Simple and modern abstract art meant to "convey a sense of frozen motion."	United States	ERJ-145	G-EMBE	13	
Waves of the City	Jenifer Kobylarz	Simple and modern abstract art meant to "convey a sense of frozen motion."	United States	Avro RJ100	G-BZAT	13	
Whale Rider	Joe David	From wood carving representing the whaling tradition of the Tla-o-qui-aht First Nations.	Canada	Boeing 737-200	G-BGDO	9	
Whale Rider	Joe David	From wood carving representing the whaling tradition of the Tla-o-qui-aht First Nations.	Canada	Boeing 737-500	G-MSKD	9	
Whale Rider	Joe David	From wood carving representing the whaling tradition of the Tla-o-qui-aht First Nations.	Canada	Boeing 757-200	G-CPEO	9	
Whale Rider	Joe David	From wood carving representing the whaling tradition of the Tla-o-qui-aht First Nations.	Canada	Boeing 747-400	G-BNLG, CIVS, CIVY	9	
Whale Rider	Joe David	From wood carving representing the whaling tradition of the Tla-o-qui-aht First Nations.	Canada	Boeing 777-200	G-VIIN	9	
Whale Rider	Joe David	From wood carving representing the whaling tradition of the Tla-o-qui-aht First Nations.	Canada	Airbus A320-200	G-MEDA	9	
Whale Rider	Joe David	From wood carving representing the whaling tradition of the Tla-o-qui-aht First Nations.	Canada	ATR72-200	G-BXTN	9	
Wings (Vinger)	Per Arnoldi	Modernist representation of seagulls in flight.	Denmark	Boeing 747-400	G-BNLH, CIVU	13	
Wings (Vinger)	Per Arnoldi	Modernist representation of seagulls in flight.	Denmark	Boeing 757-200	G-CPER, CPES	13	
Wings (Vinger)	Per Arnoldi	Modernist representation of seagulls in flight.	Denmark	Boeing 767-300	G-BZHA	13	
Wings (Vinger)	Per Arnoldi	Modernist representation of seagulls in flight.	Denmark	Boeing 777-200	G-VIIL	13	
Wings (Vinger)	Per Arnoldi	Modernist representation of seagulls in flight.	Denmark	British Aerospace ATP	OY-SVU	13	
Wings (Vinger)	Per Arnoldi	Modernist representation of seagulls in flight.	Denmark	Airbus A320-200	G-BUSI	13	
Wings (Vinger)	Per Arnoldi	Modernist representation of seagulls in flight.	Denmark	Boeing 737-400	G-BUHL, DOCB	13	
Wings (Vinger)	Per Arnoldi	Modernist representation of seagulls in flight.	Denmark	Bombardier CRJ200	G-MSKK	13	
Wings (Vinger)	Per Arnoldi	Modernist representation of seagulls in flight.	Denmark	BAe Jetstream 41	G-MAJK, OY-SVW	13	
Wunala Dreaming	The Balarinji Design Studio	Like Nalanji Dreaming, this livery was designed for Qantas in 1994 and appeared on two B747-400 aircraft: VH-OJB and VH-OEJ. Based on an original painting inspired by "the natural colors of Australia" and executed by the Yanyuwa people. The title translates to "Kangaroo Dreaming".	Australia	Boeing 757-200	G-BIKF	2	
Wunala Dreaming	The Balarinji Design Studio	Like Nalanji Dreaming, this livery was designed for Qantas in 1994 and appeared on two B747-400 aircraft: VH-OJB and VH-OEJ. Based on an original painting inspired by "the natural colors of Australia" and executed by the Yanyuwa people. The title translates to "Kangaroo Dreaming".	Australia	Boeing 747-400	G-BNLS	2	
Youm al-Suq (Market Day)	Shadia Alem	Abstract inspired by Arab life on market day.	Saudi Arabia	Boeing 737-400	G-GBTA	2	
Youm al-Suq (Market Day)	Shadia Alem	Abstract inspired by Arab life on market day.	Saudi Arabia	ERJ-145	G-EMBJ	2	

== Photo gallery ==
=== Boeing 747 ===
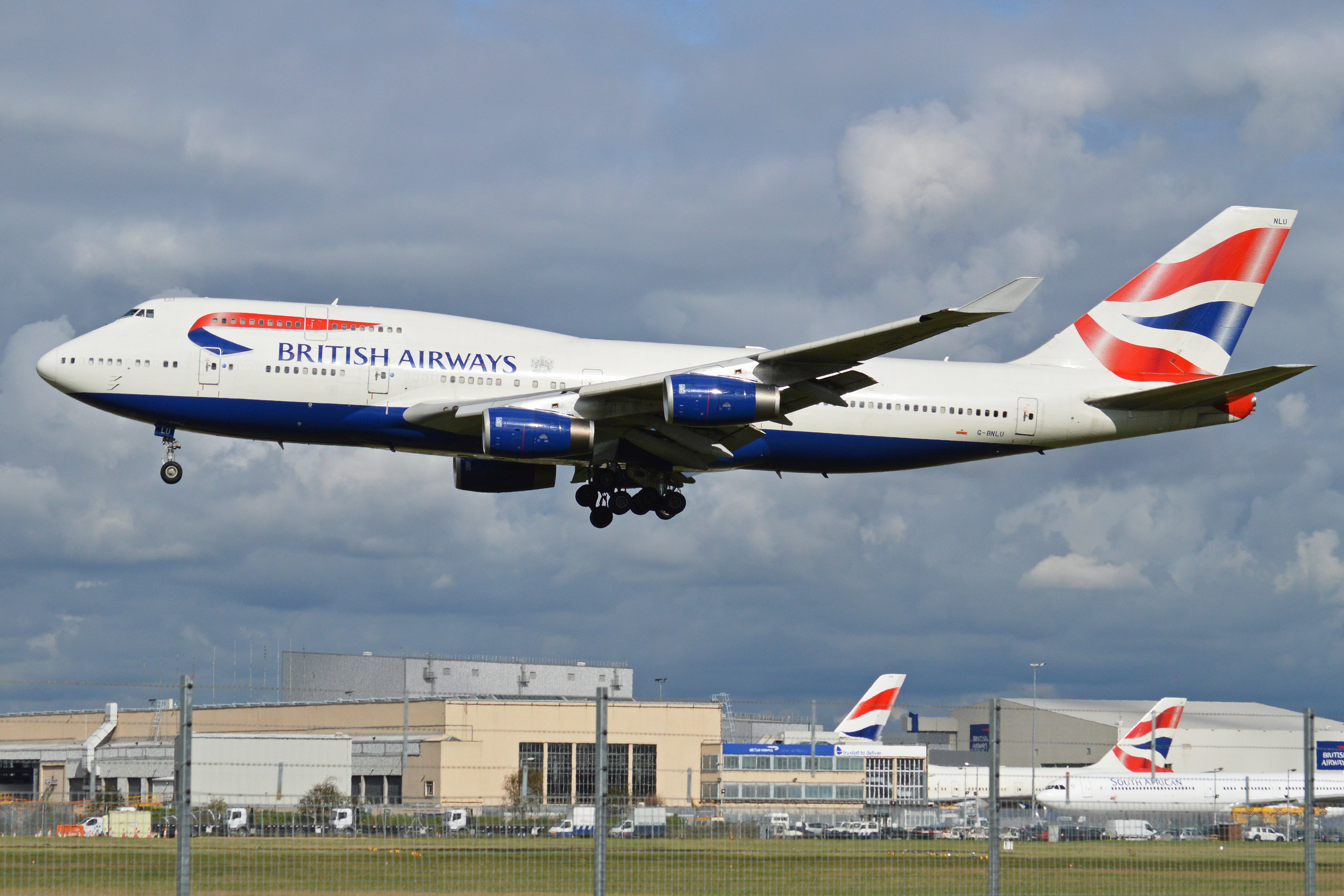
Chatham Dockyard Union Flag

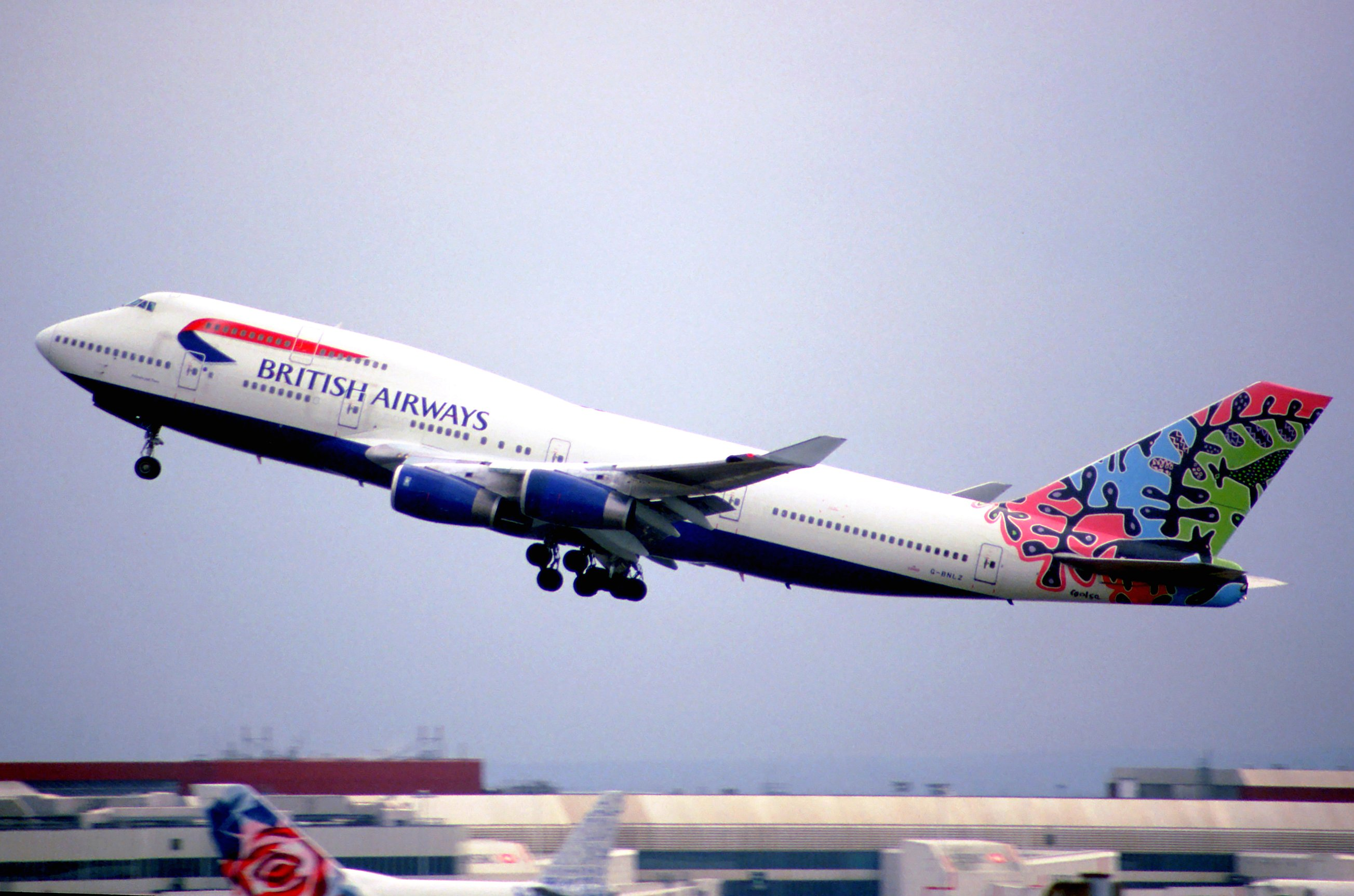
Animals and trees

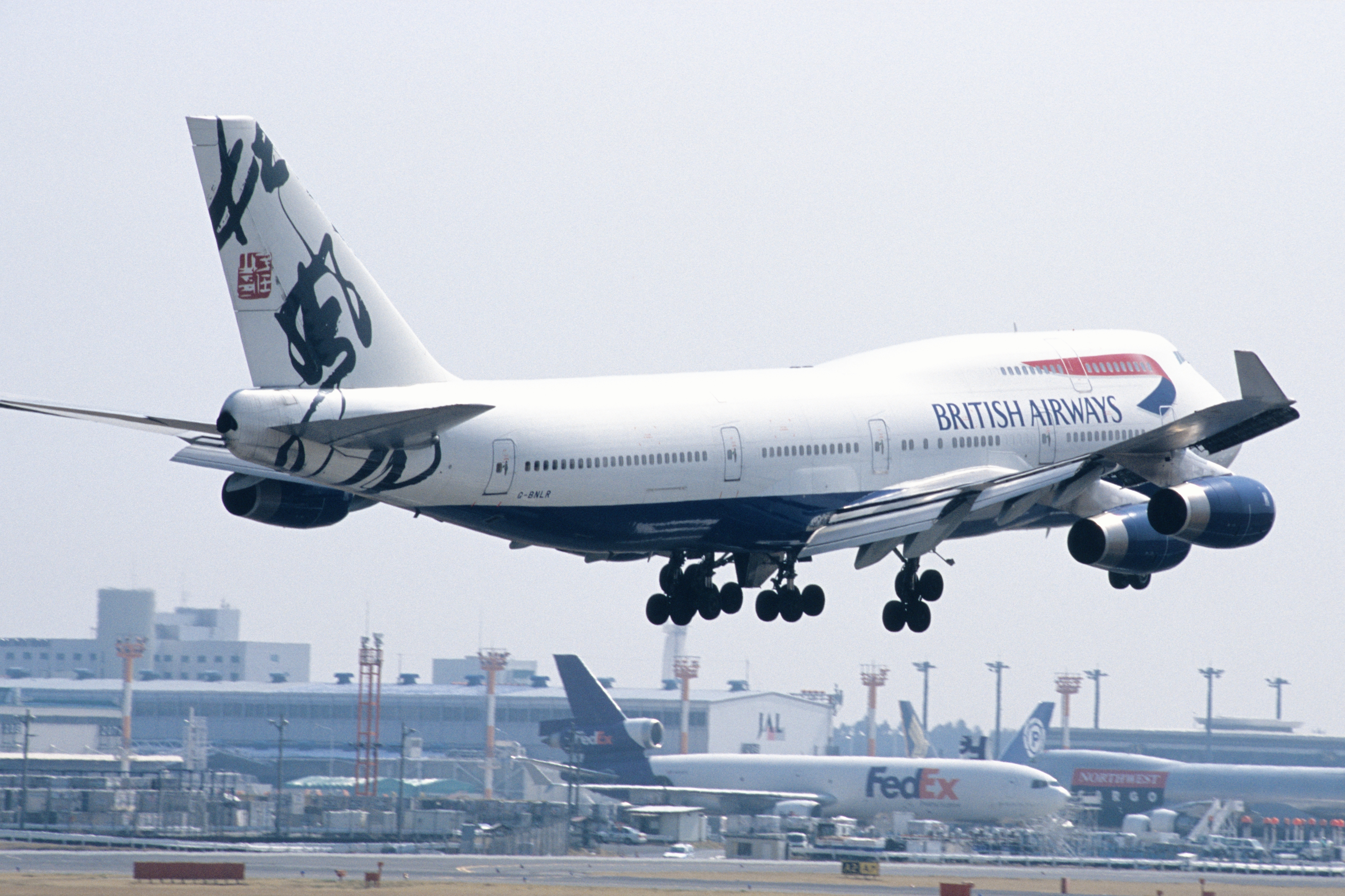
Rendezvous

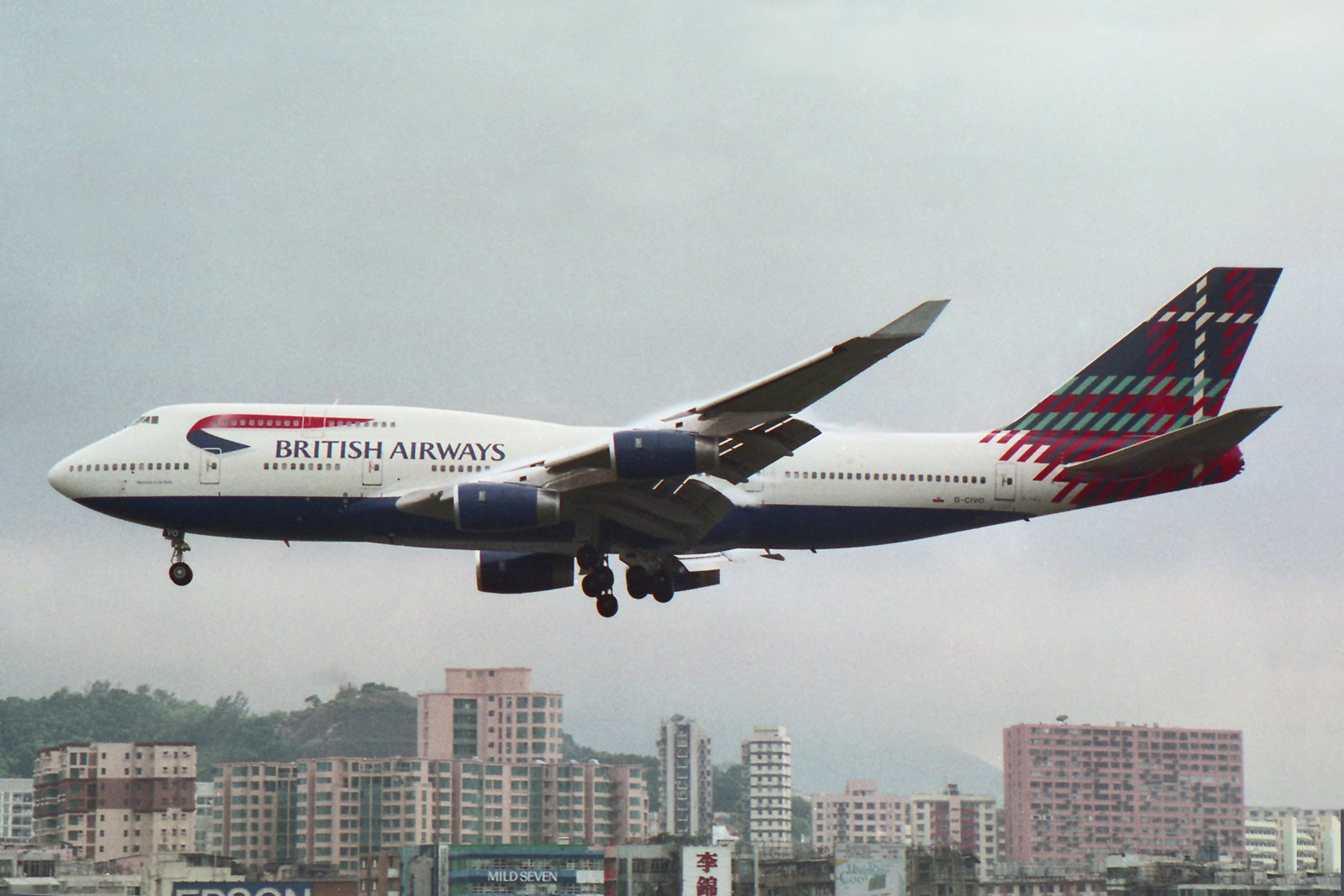
Benyhone

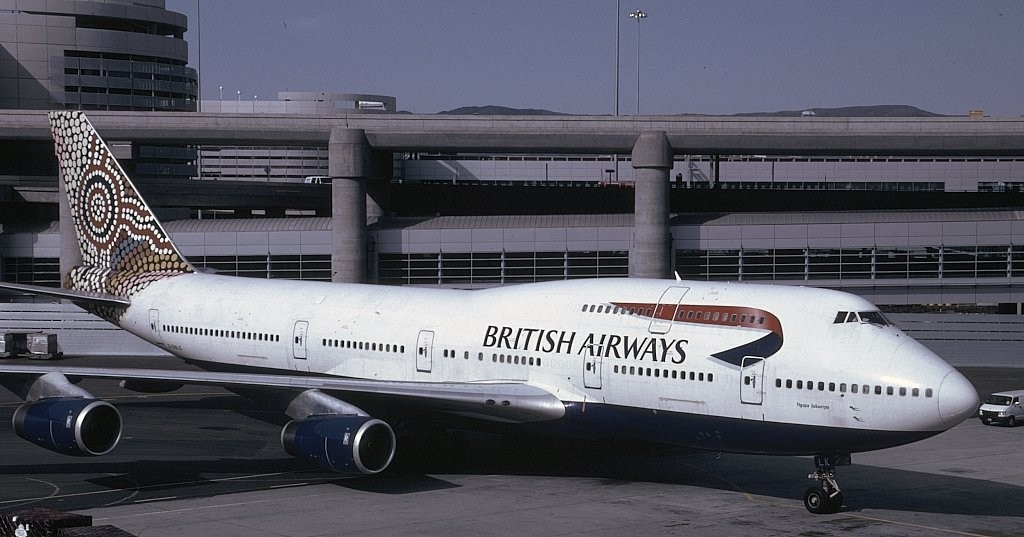
Water Dreaming

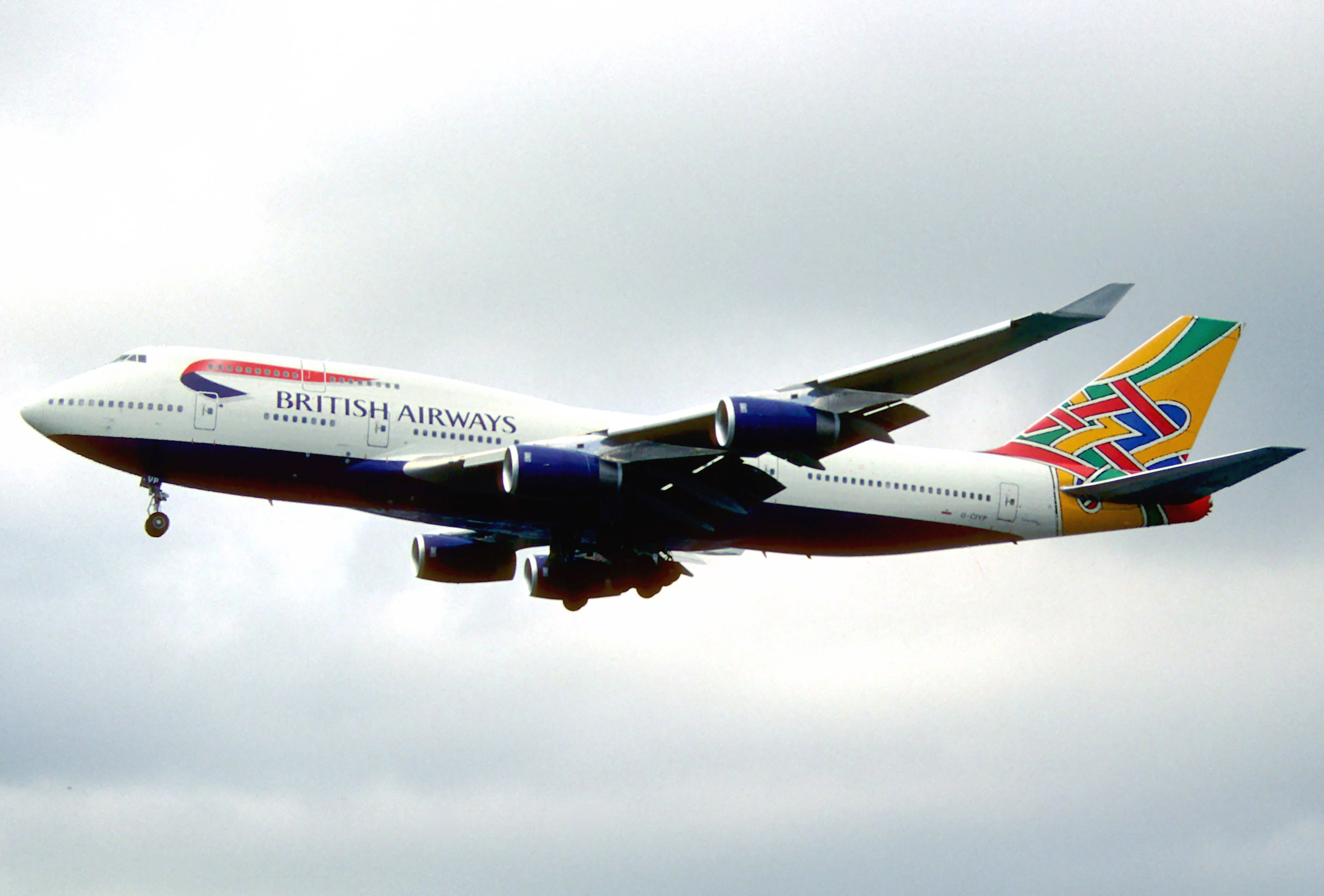
Colum 1

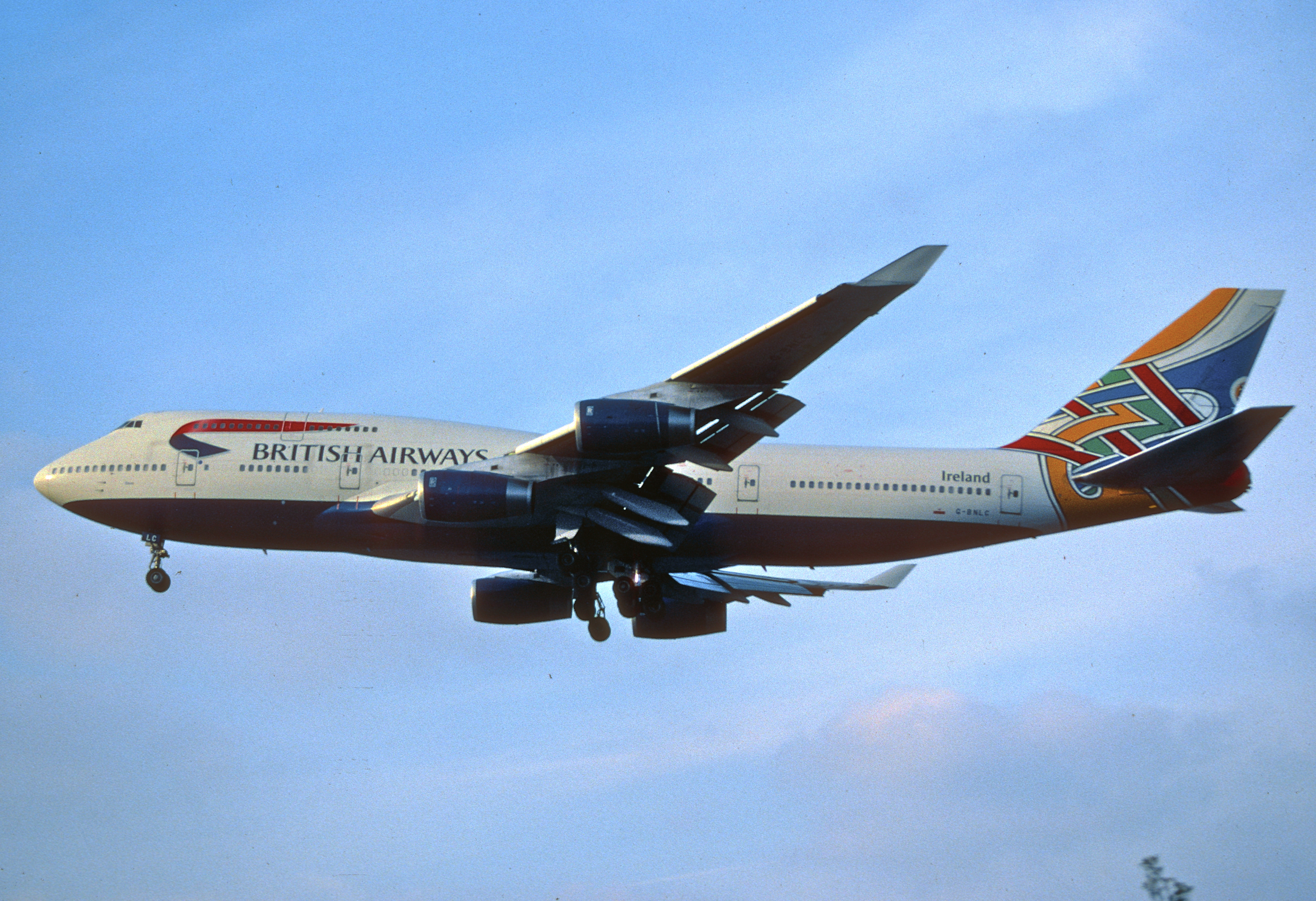
Colum 2

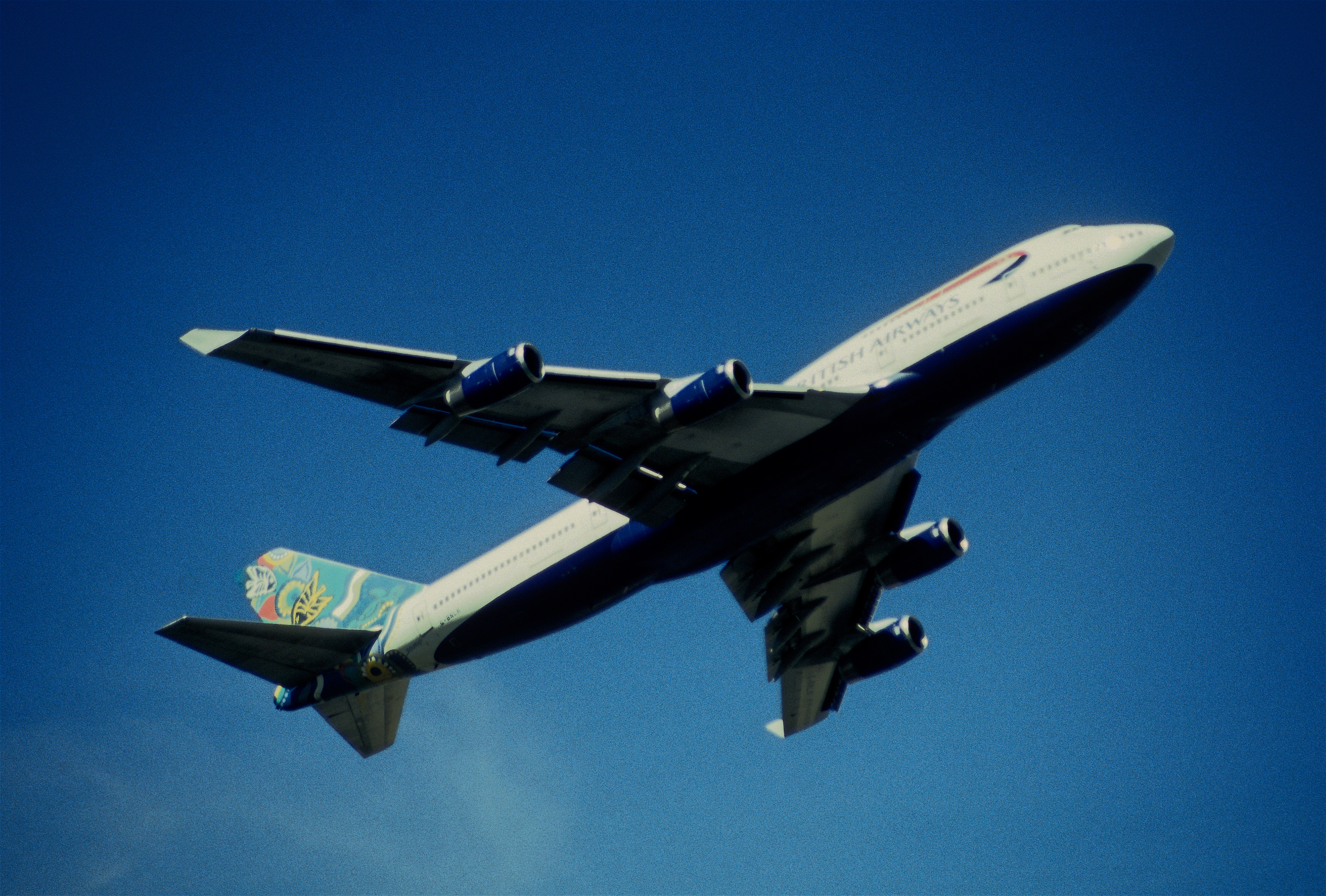
Nalanji Dreaming

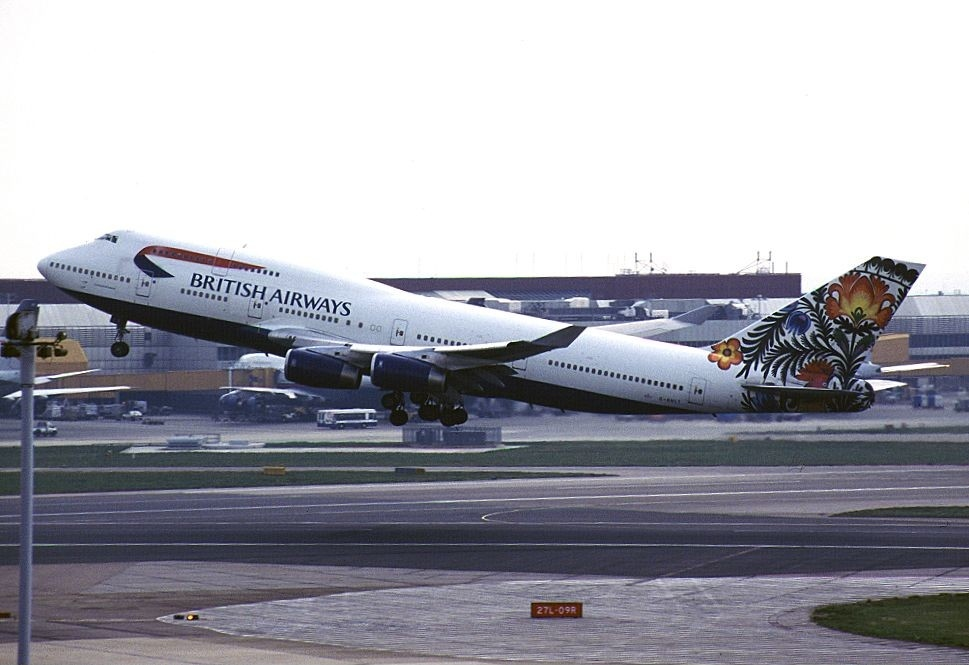
Kogutki Lowickie

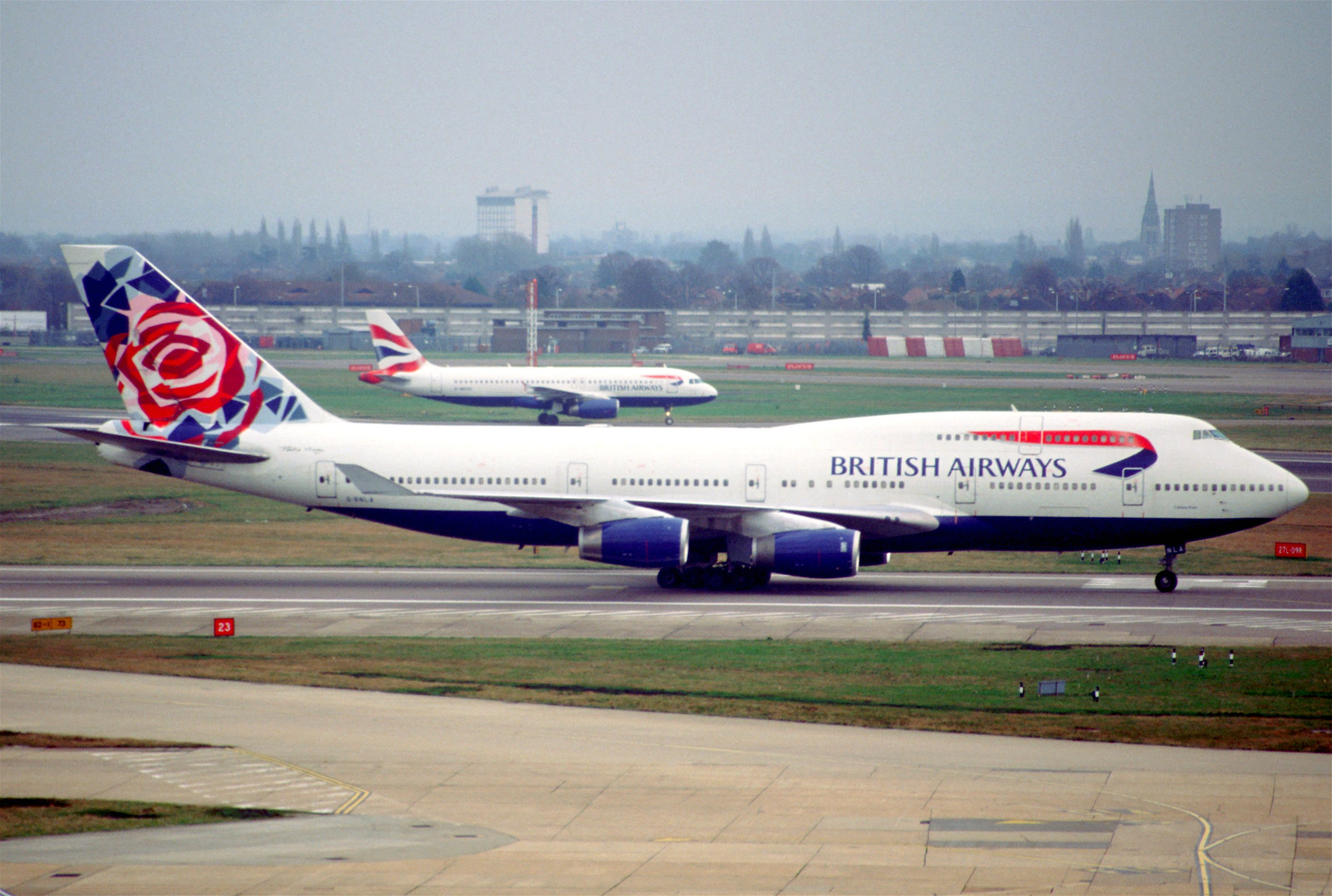
Chelsea Rose

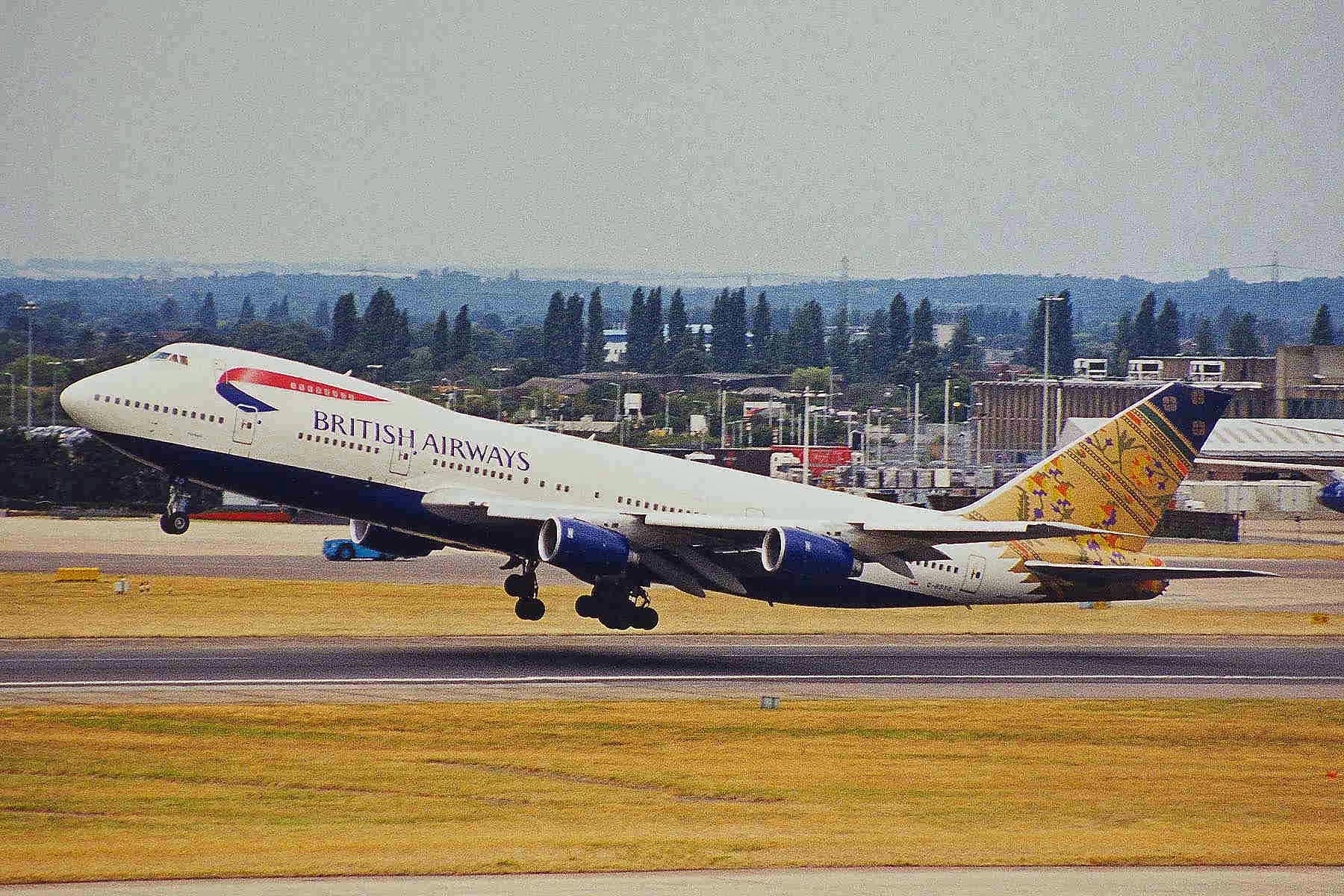
Paithani

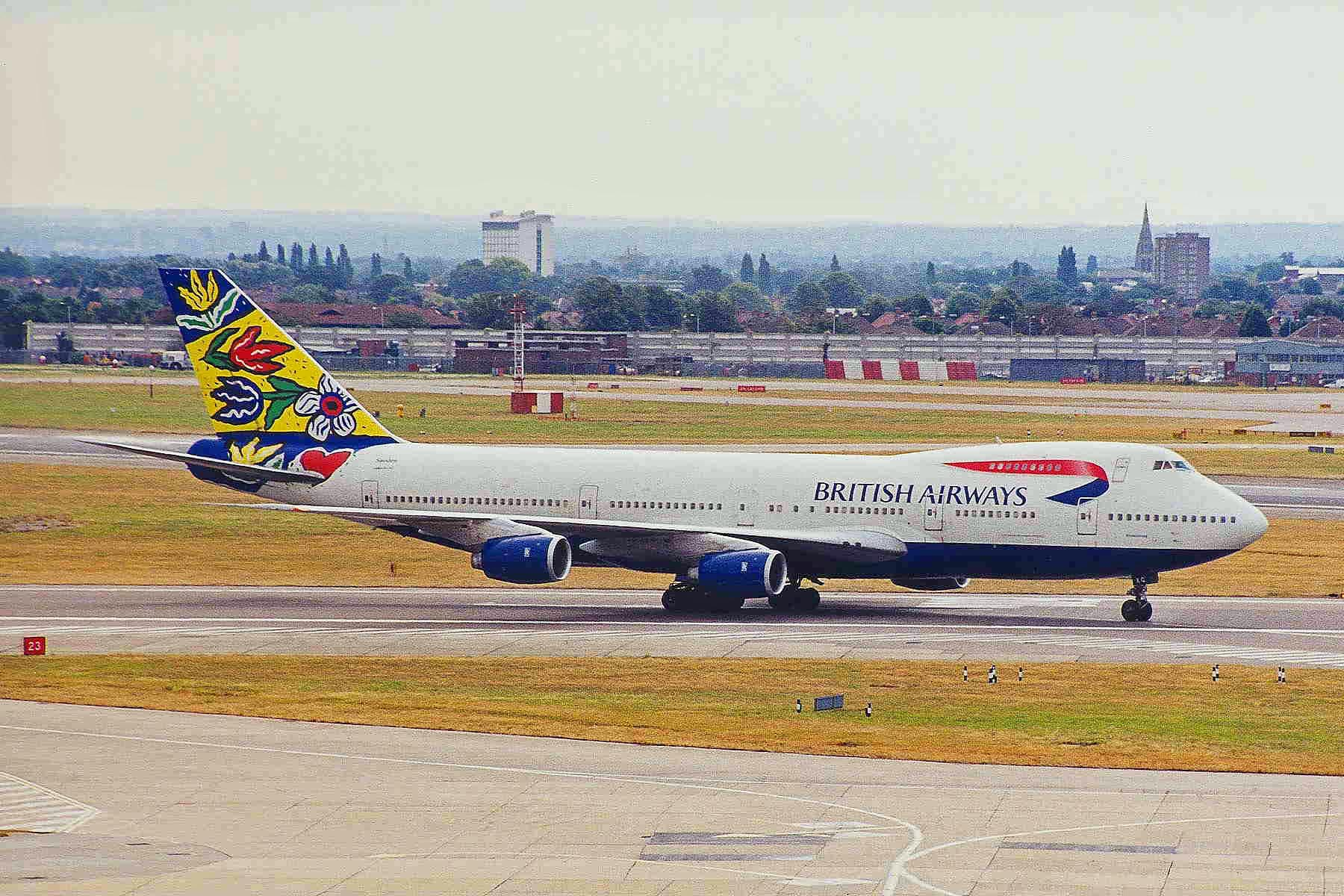
Blomsterang

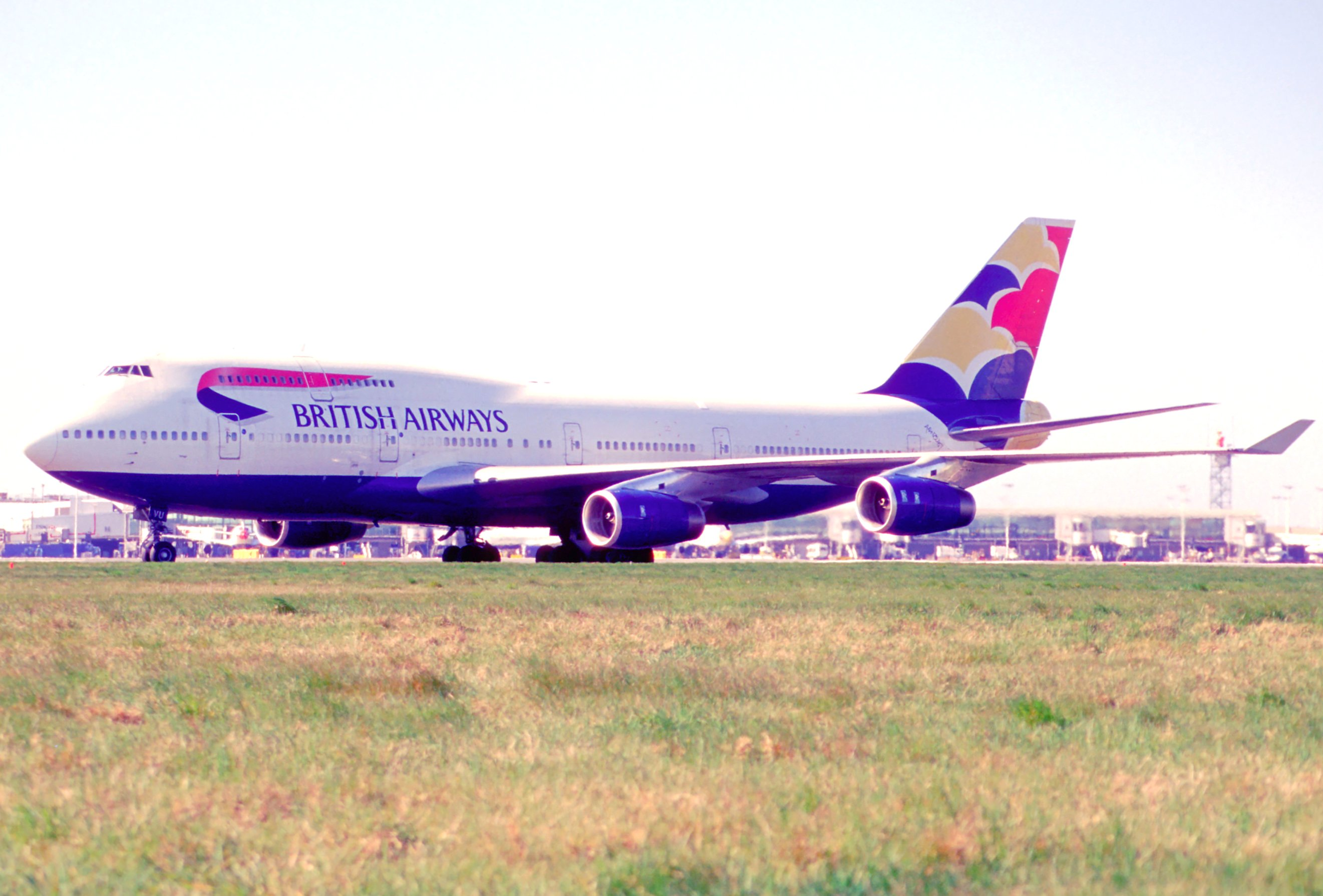
Wings

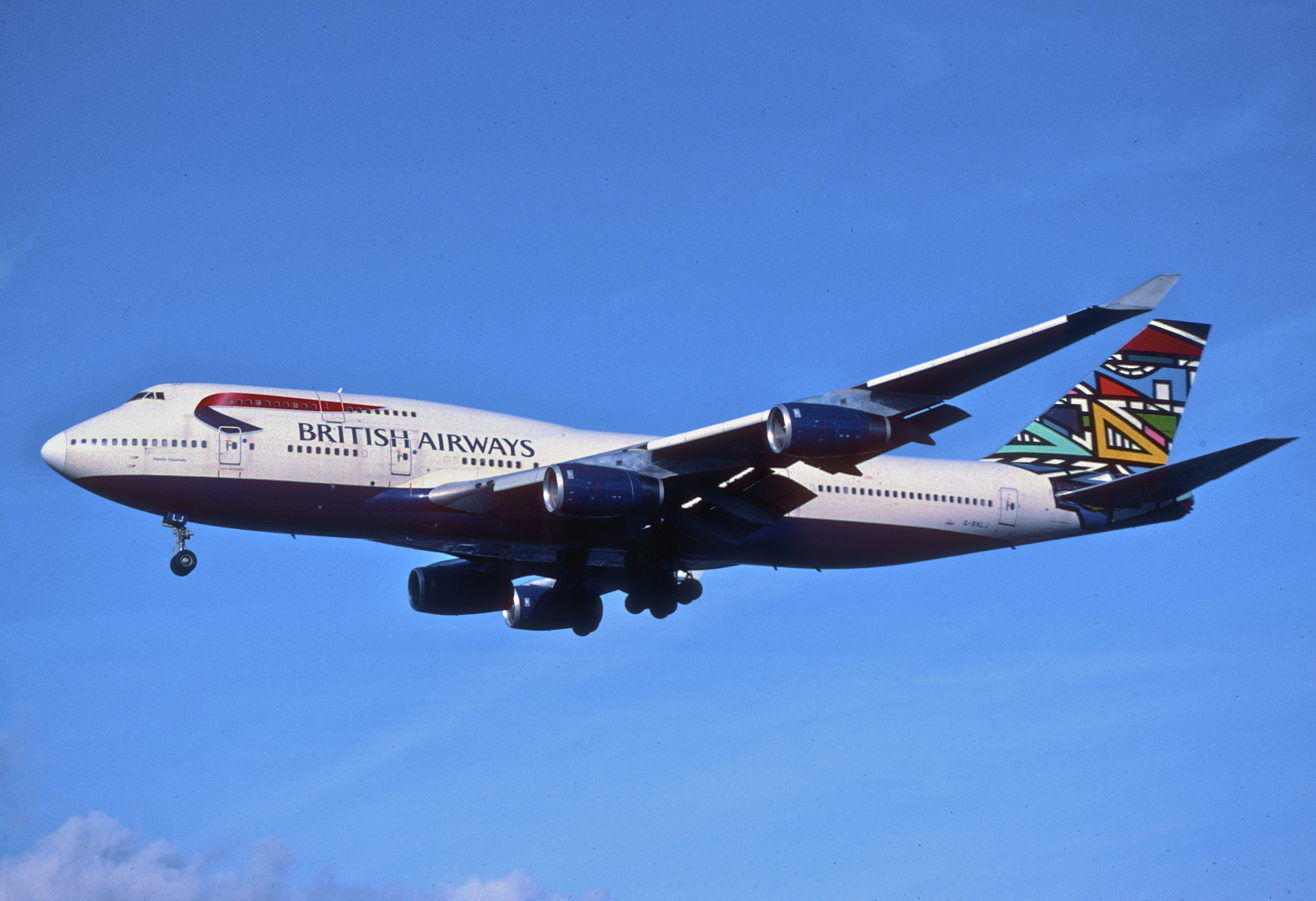
Ndebele Martha

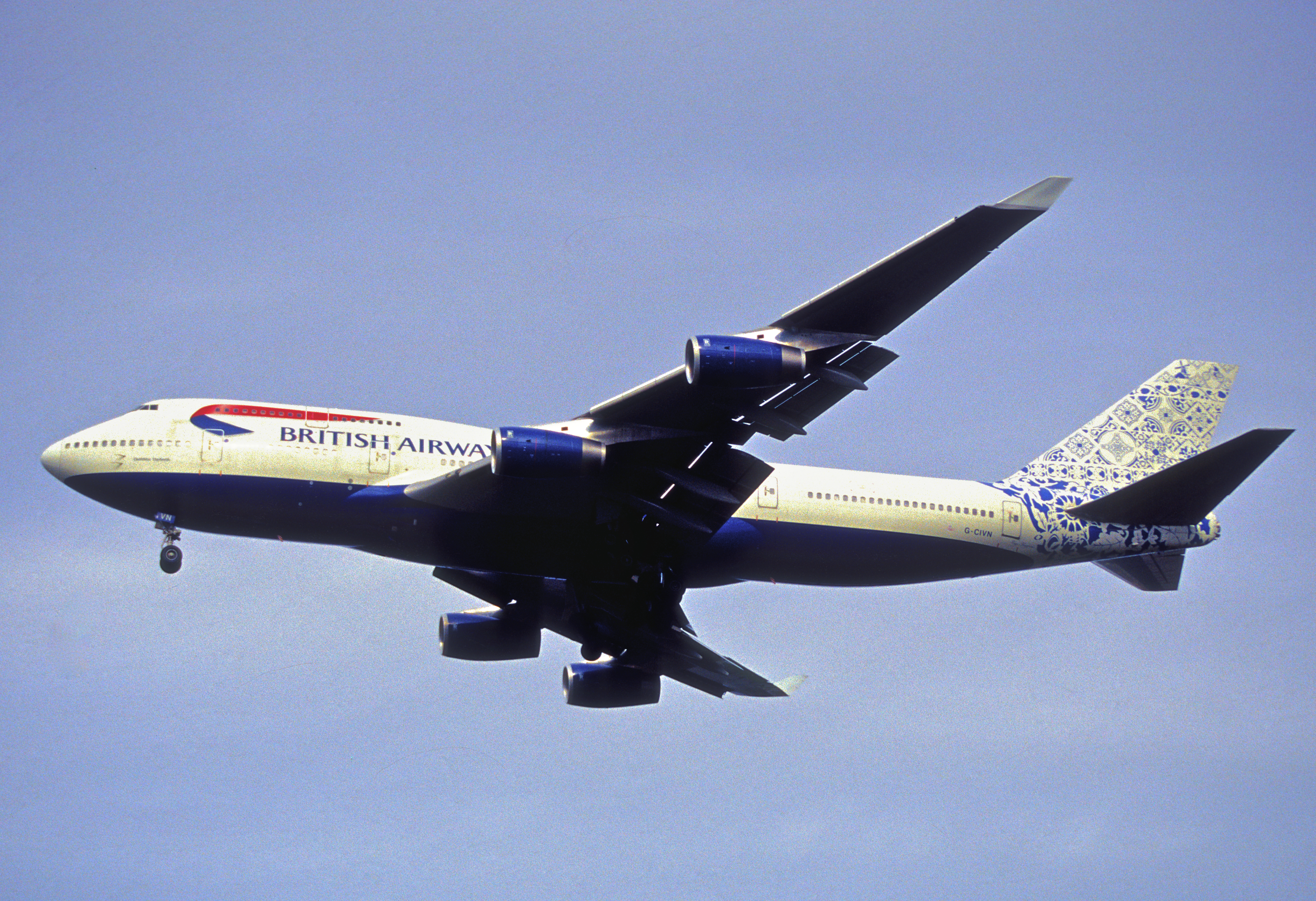
Delftblue Daybreak

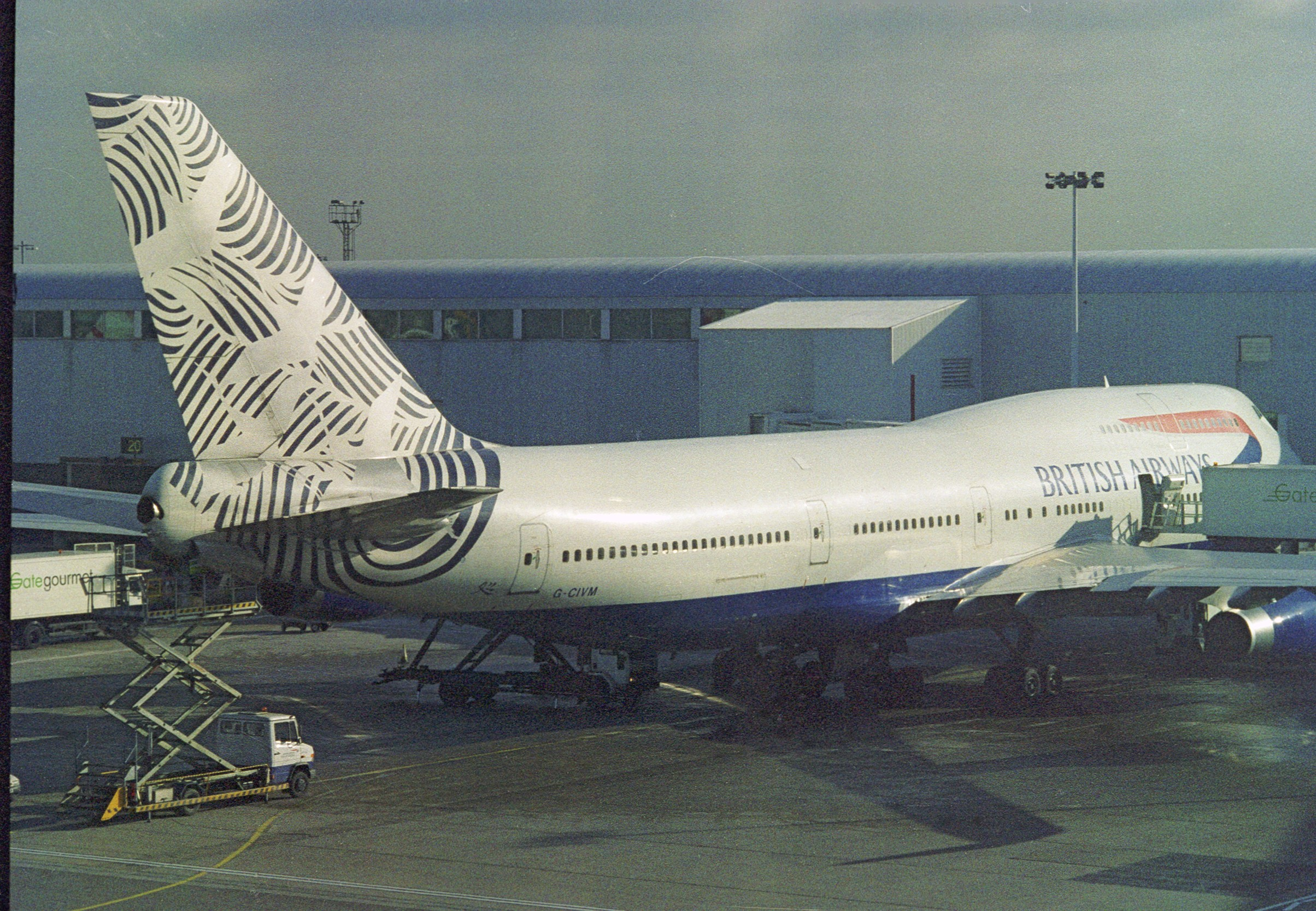
Waves and Cranes

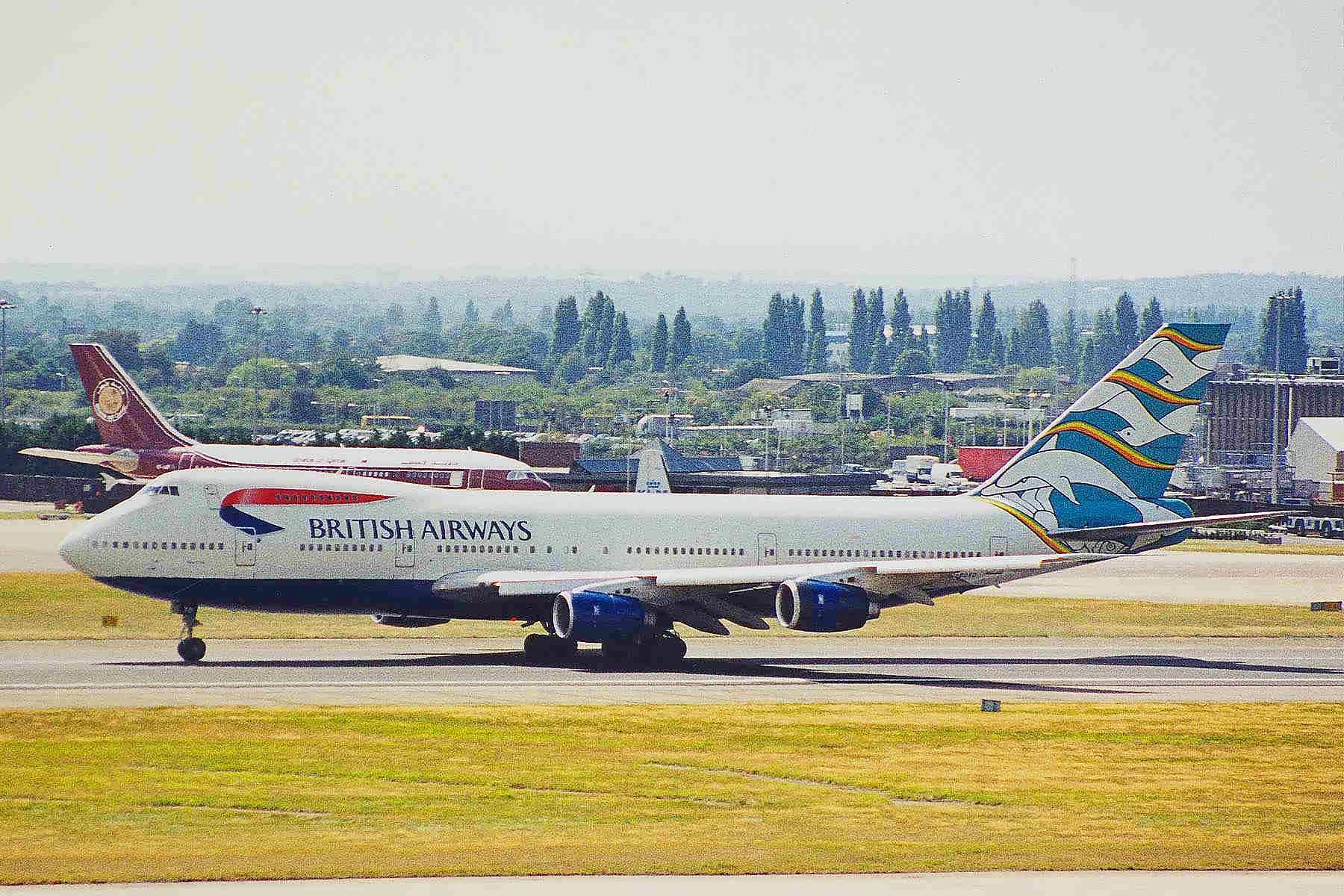
Blue Poole

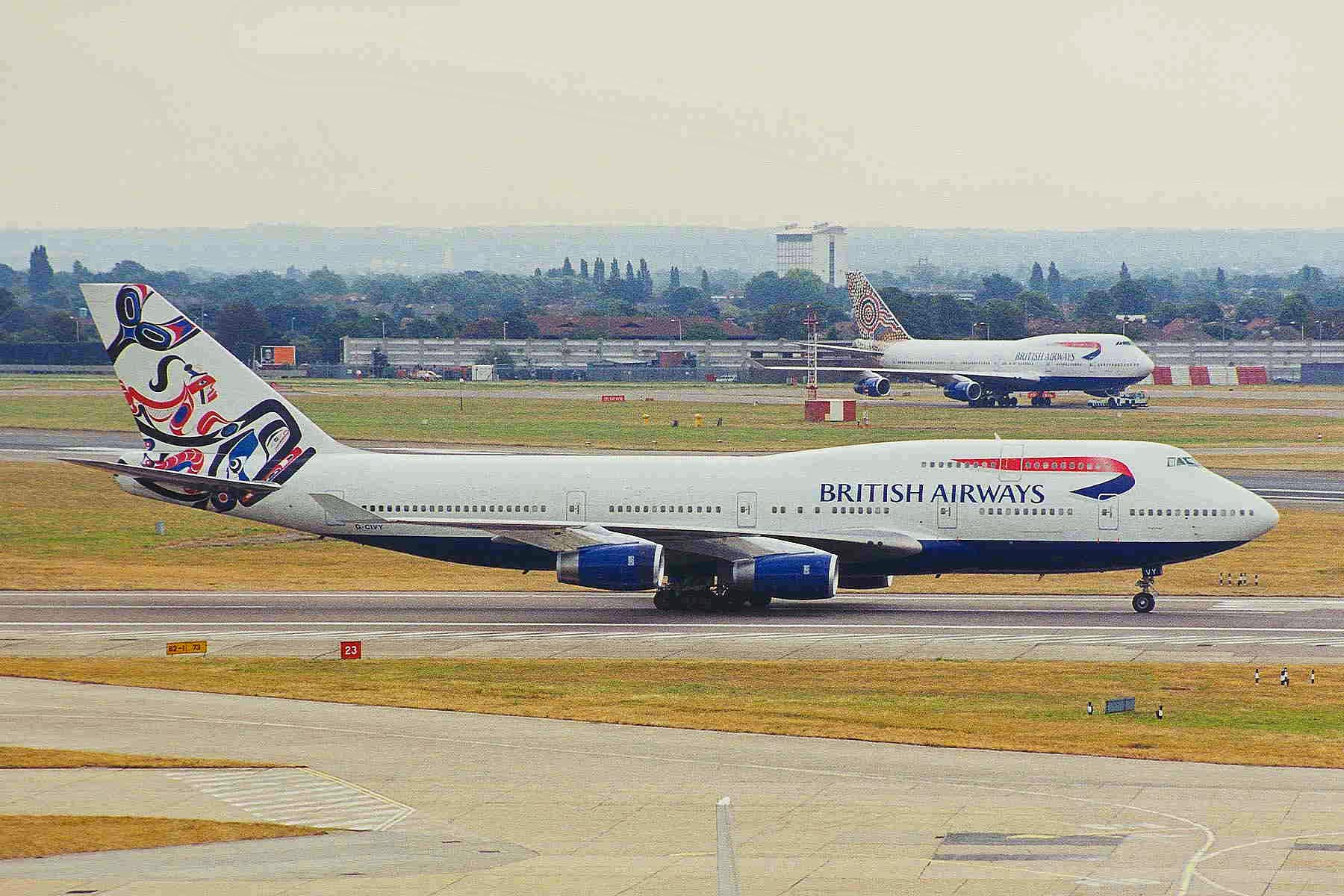
Whale Rider

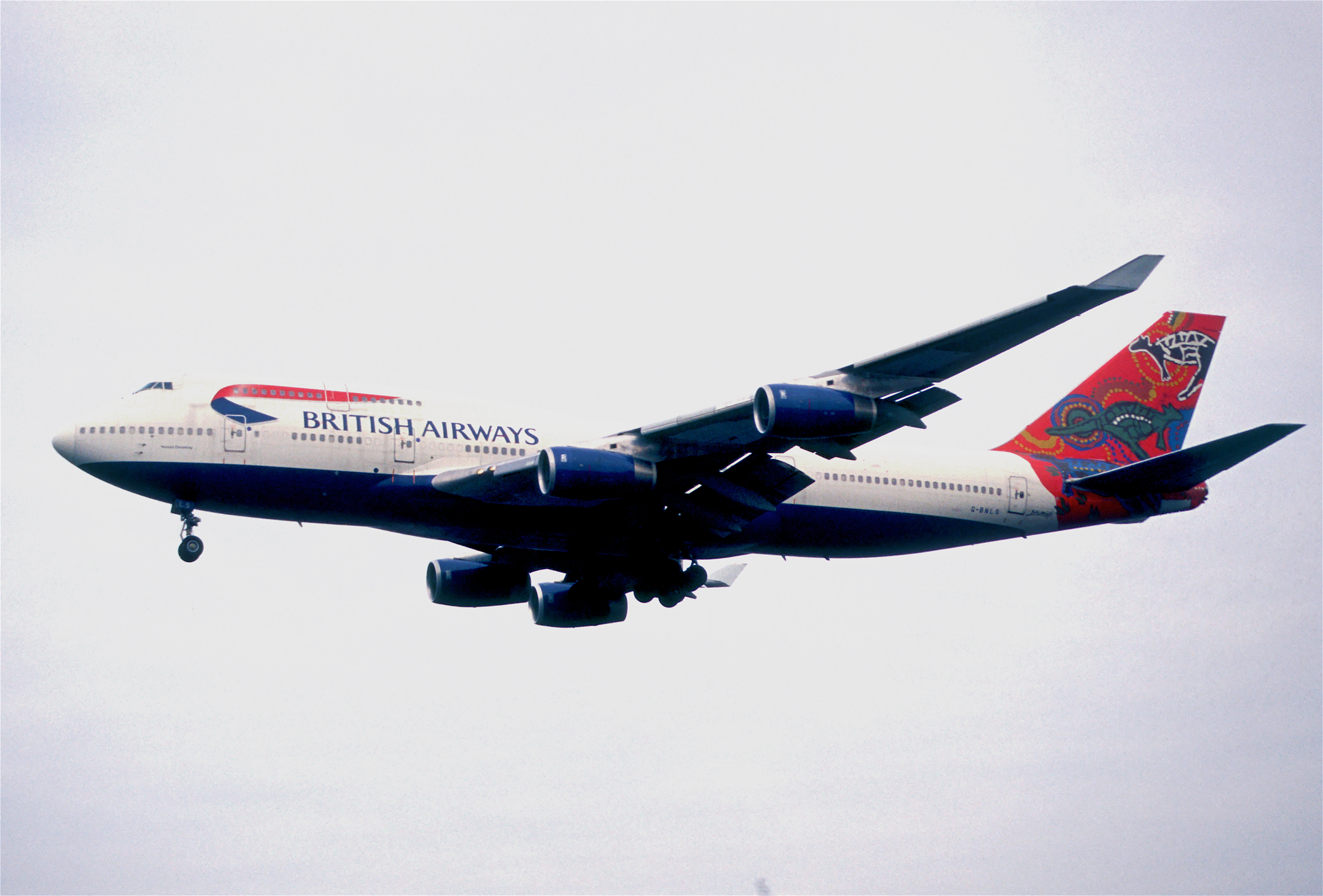
Wunala Dreaming

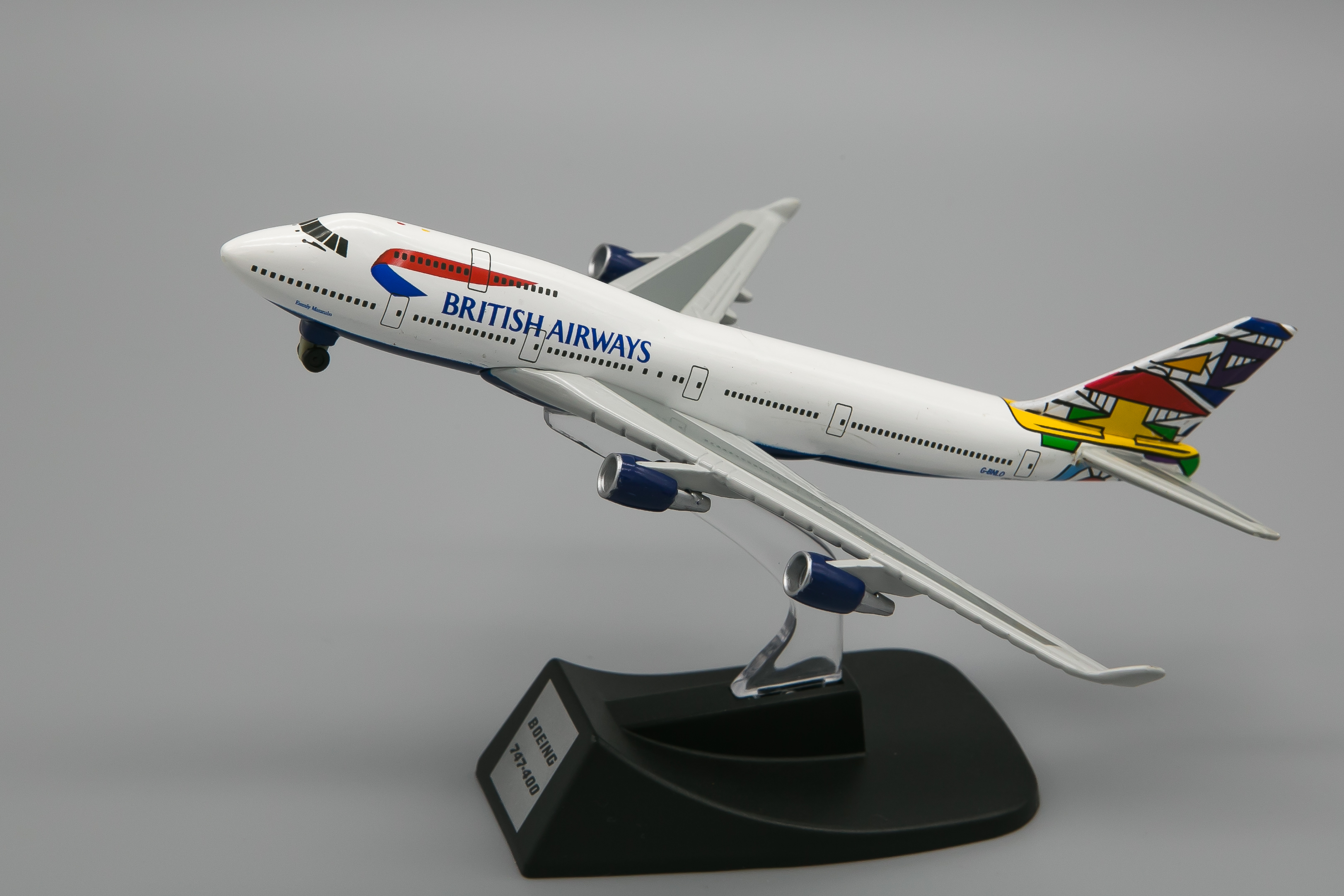
Ndebele Emmly (model plane)

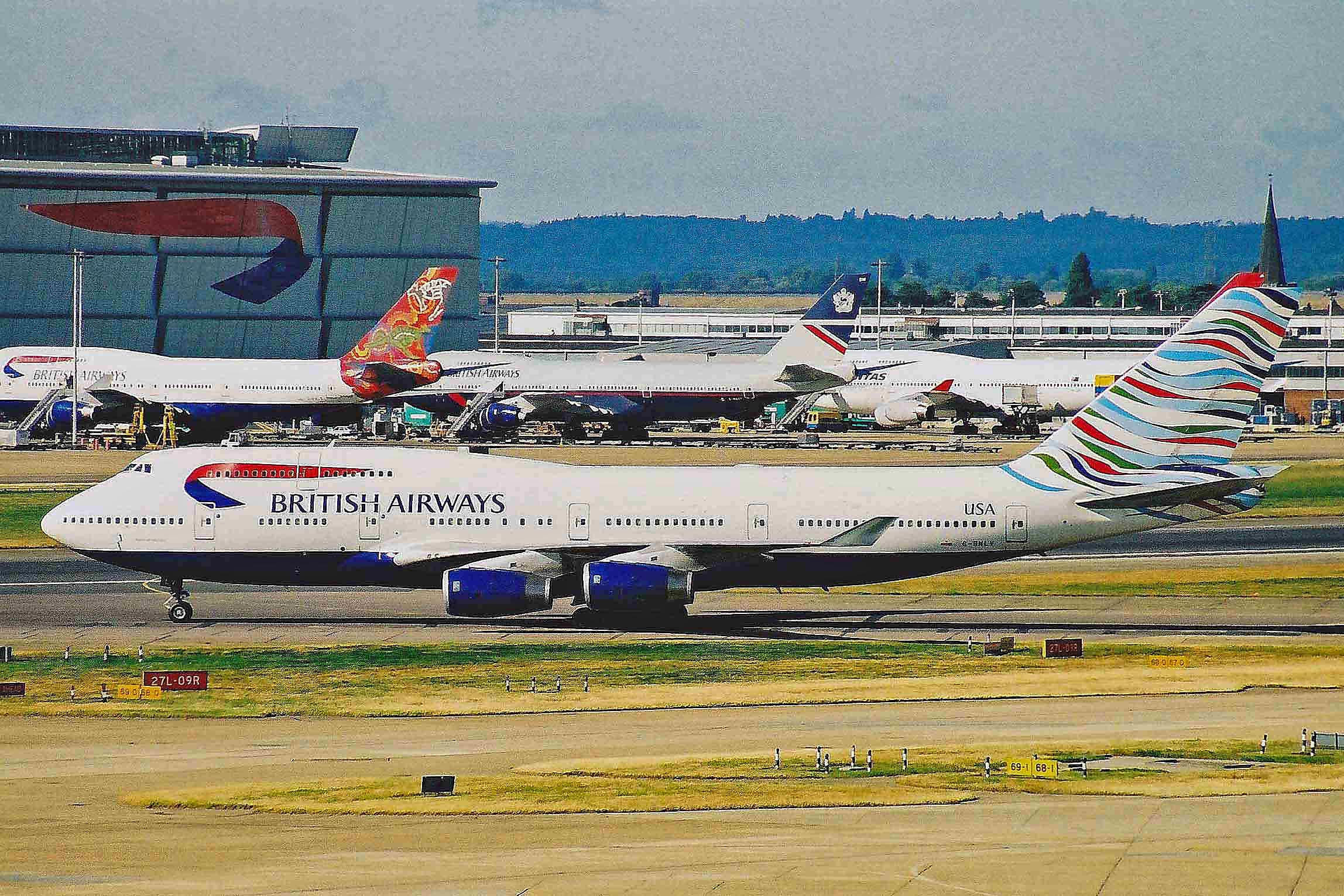
Waves of the City

=== Others ===
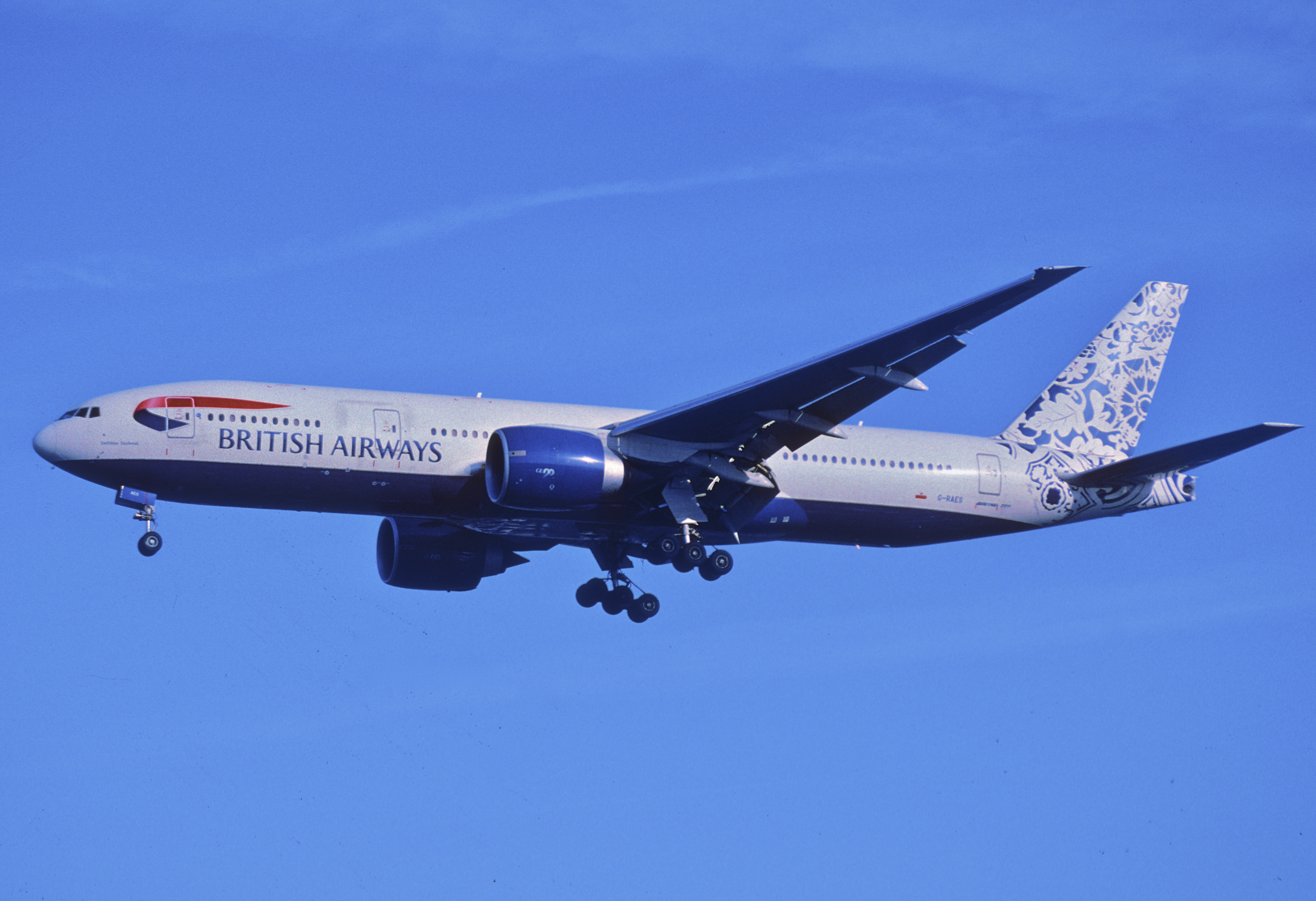
Delftblue Daybreak (Boeing 777)

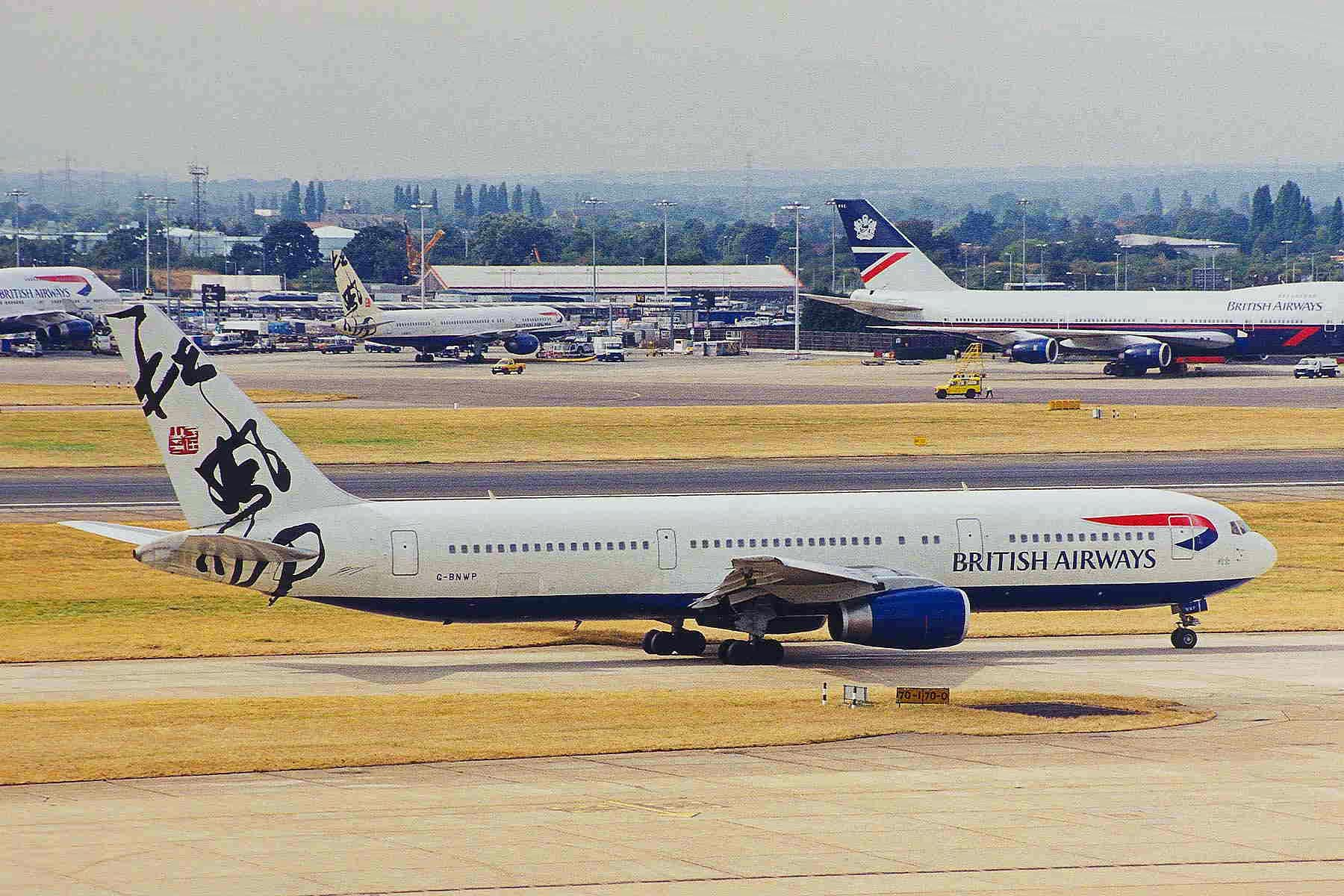
Rendezvous (Boeing 767)

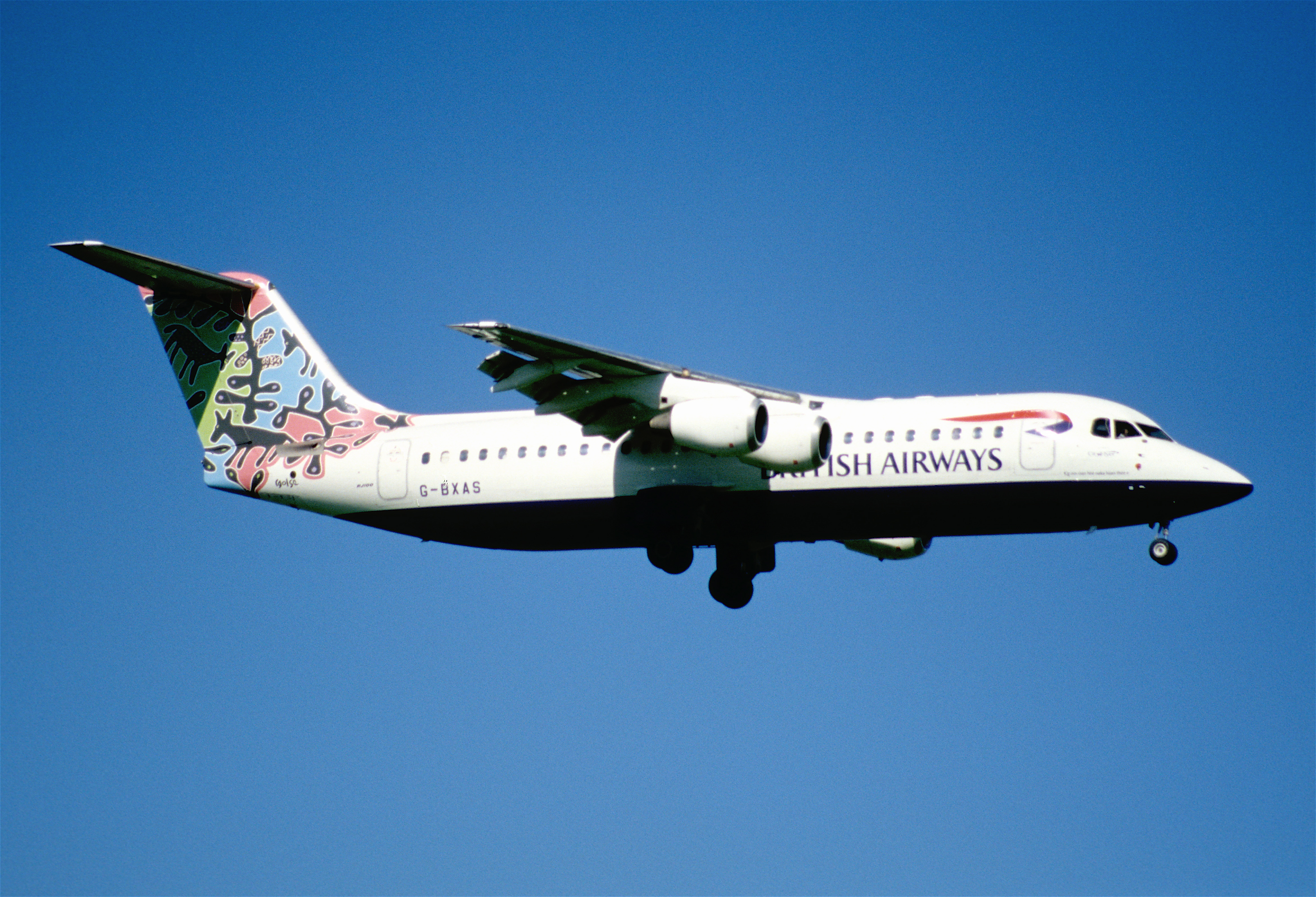
animals and trees (BAe 146)

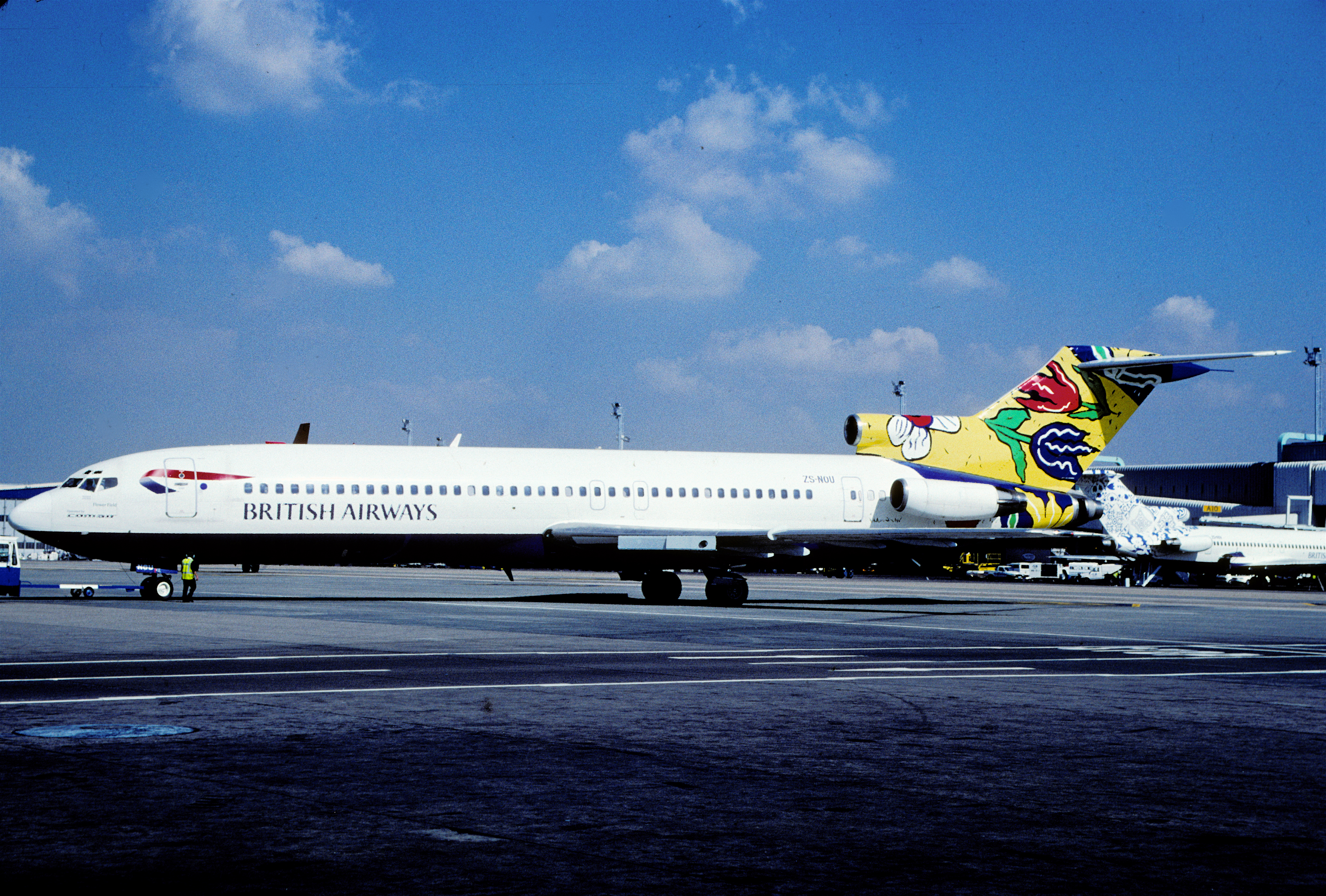
Blomsterang (Boeing 727)

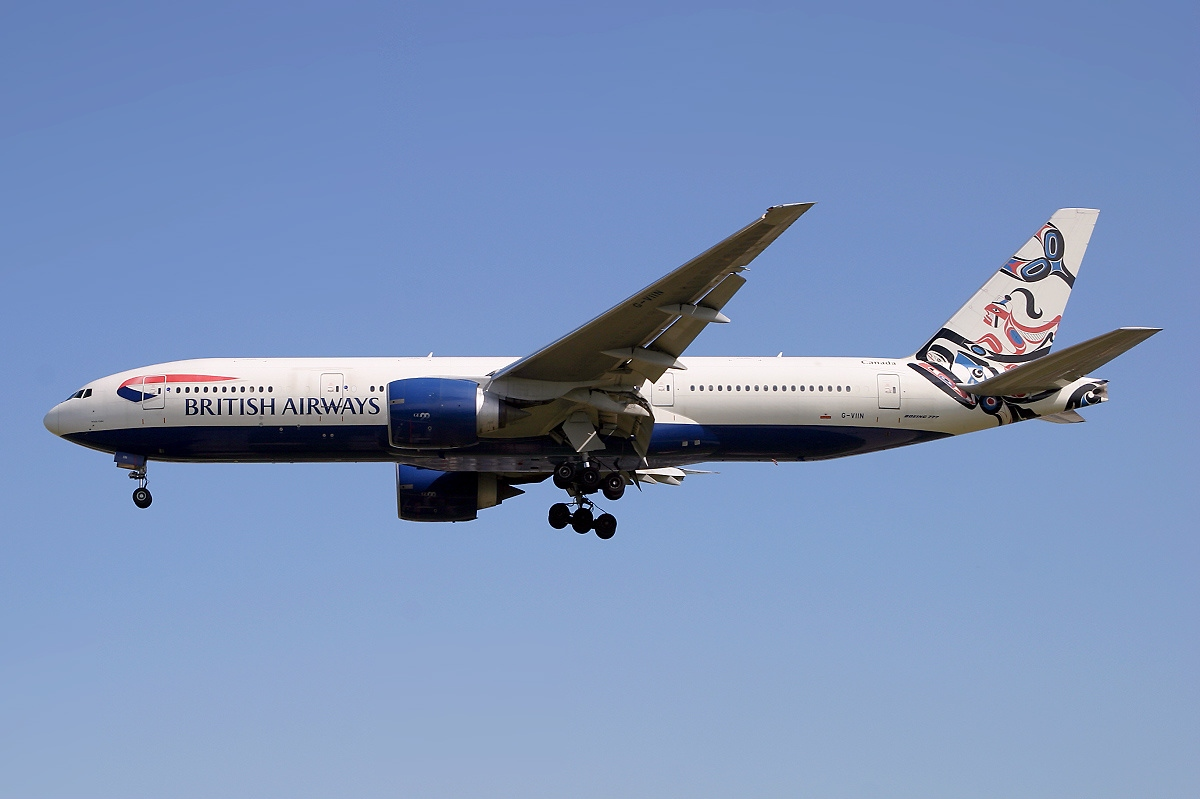
Whale Rider (Boeing 777)

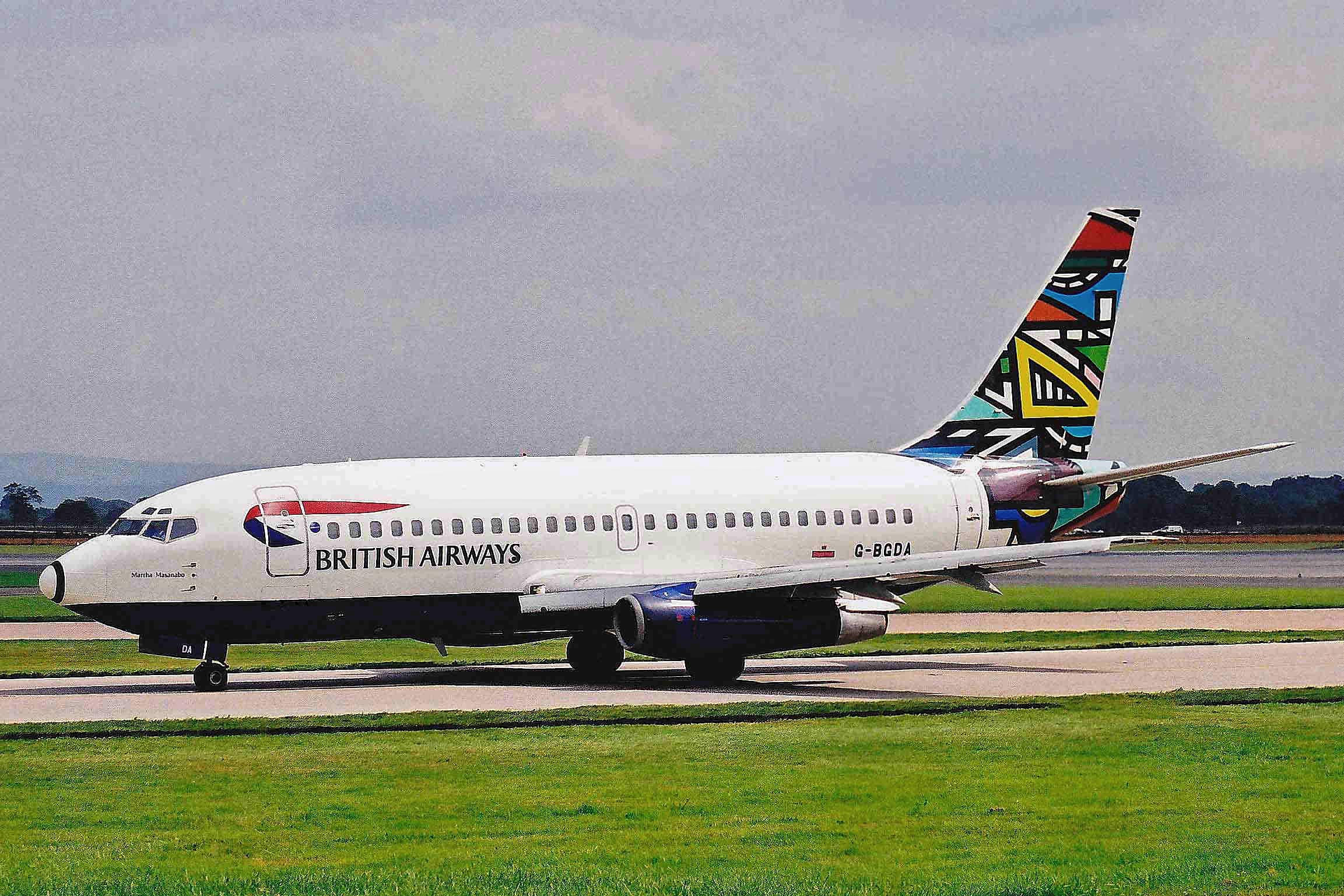
Ndebele Martha (Boeing 737)

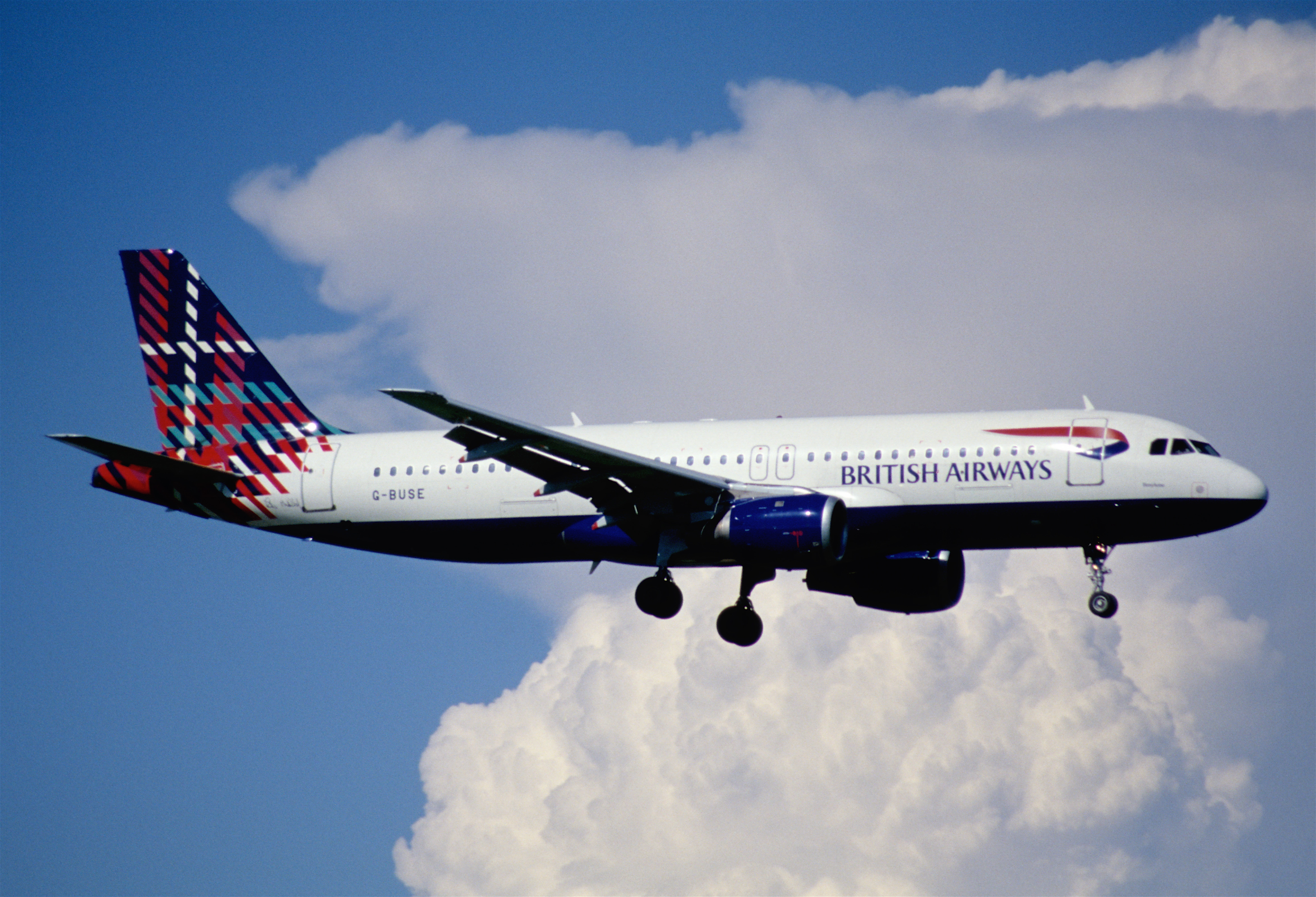
Benyhone (Airbus A320)

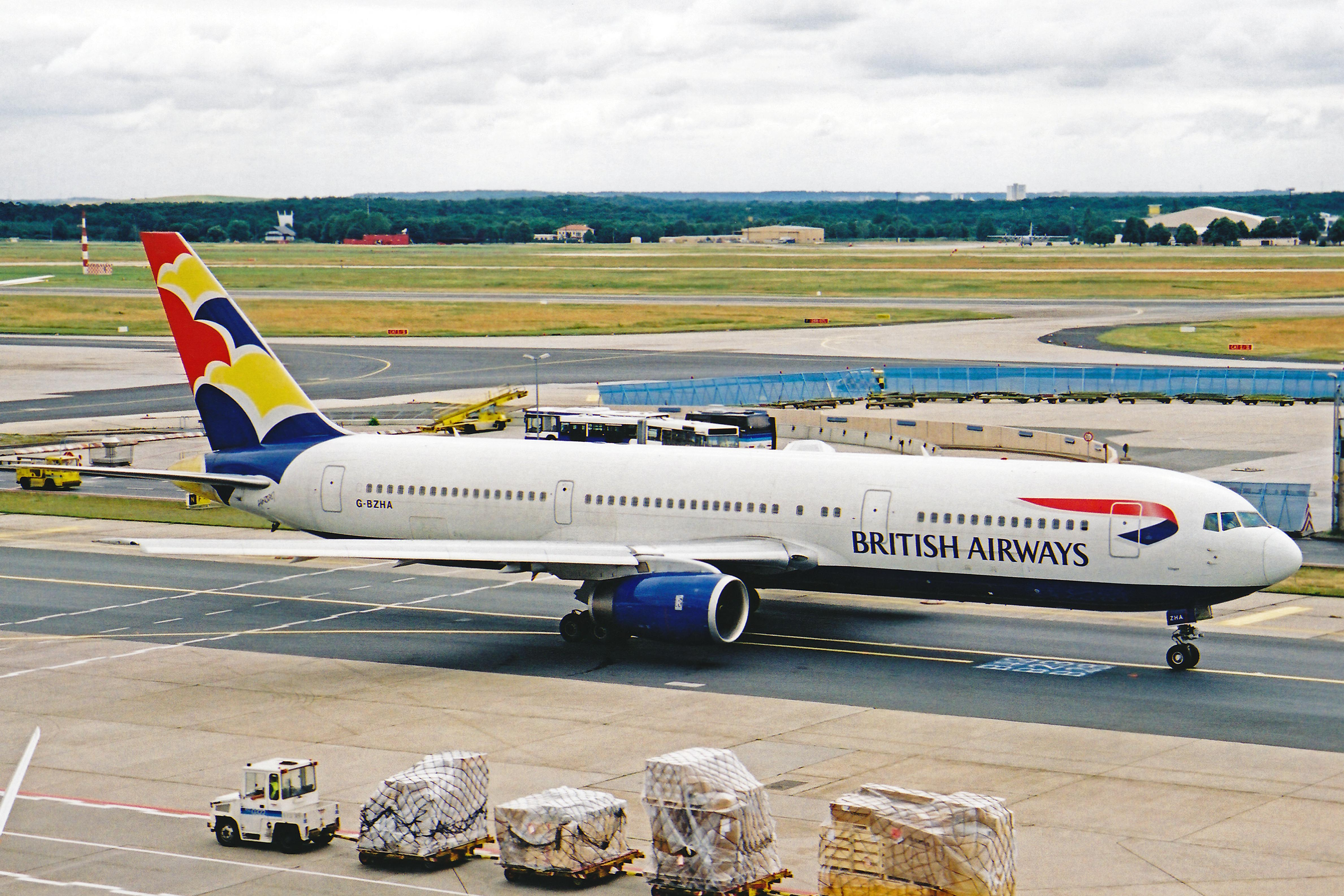
Wings (Boeing 767)

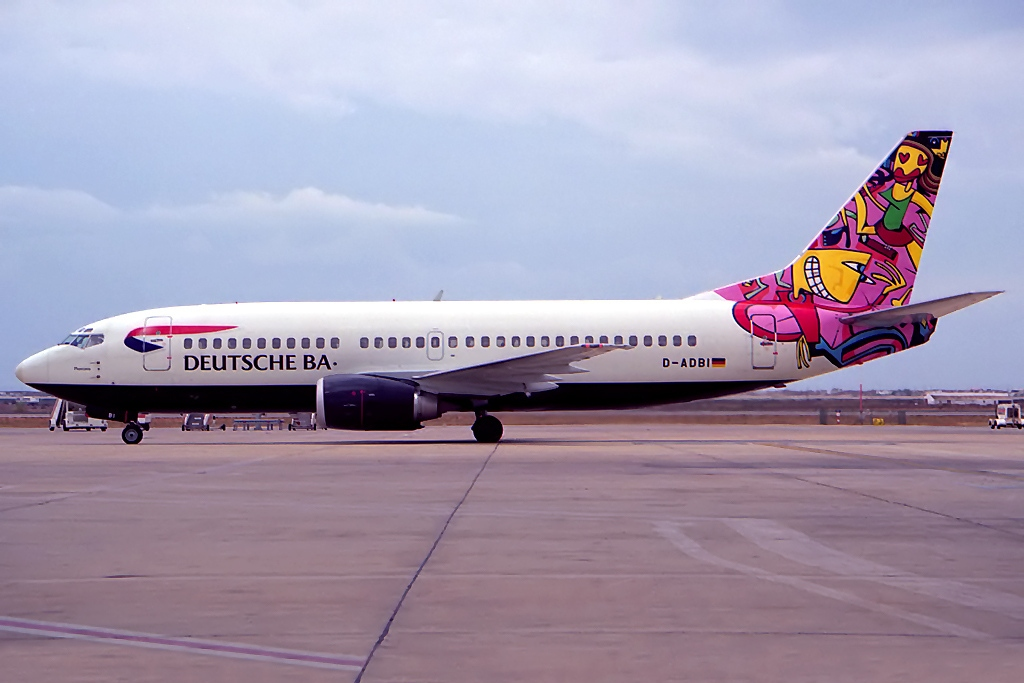
Avignon (Boeing 737)

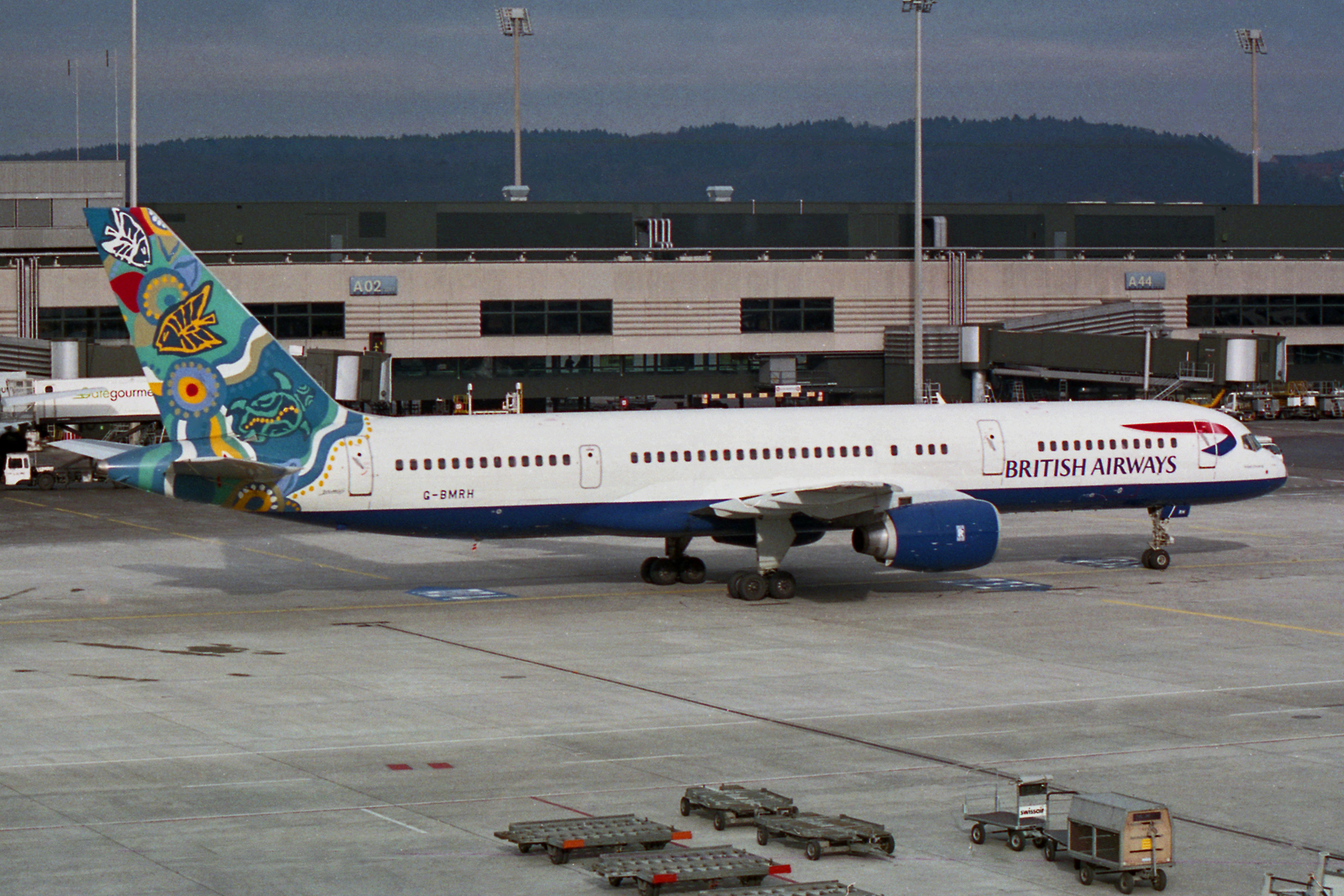
Nalanji Dreaming (Boeing 757)

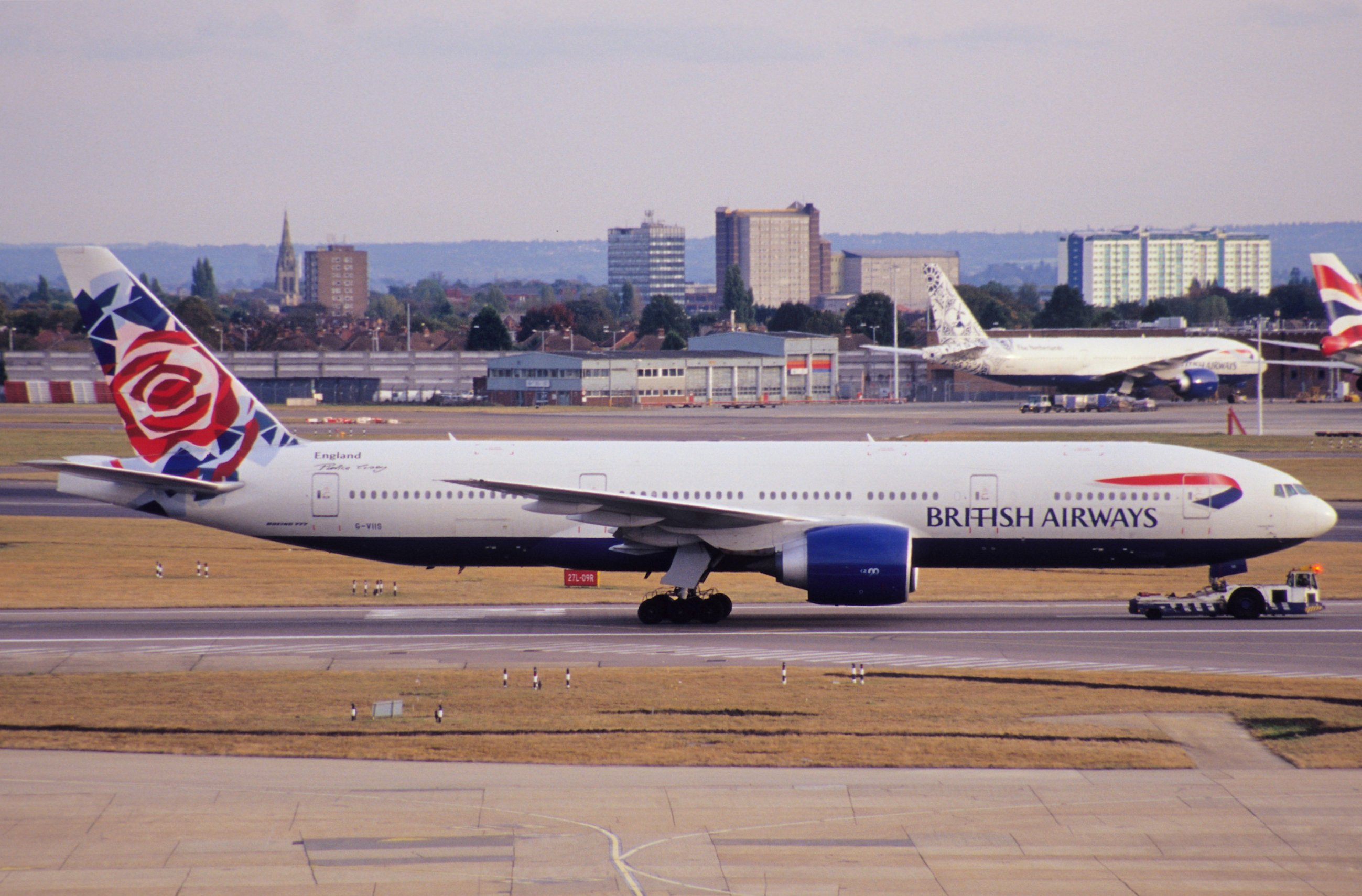
Chelsea Rose (Boeing 777)

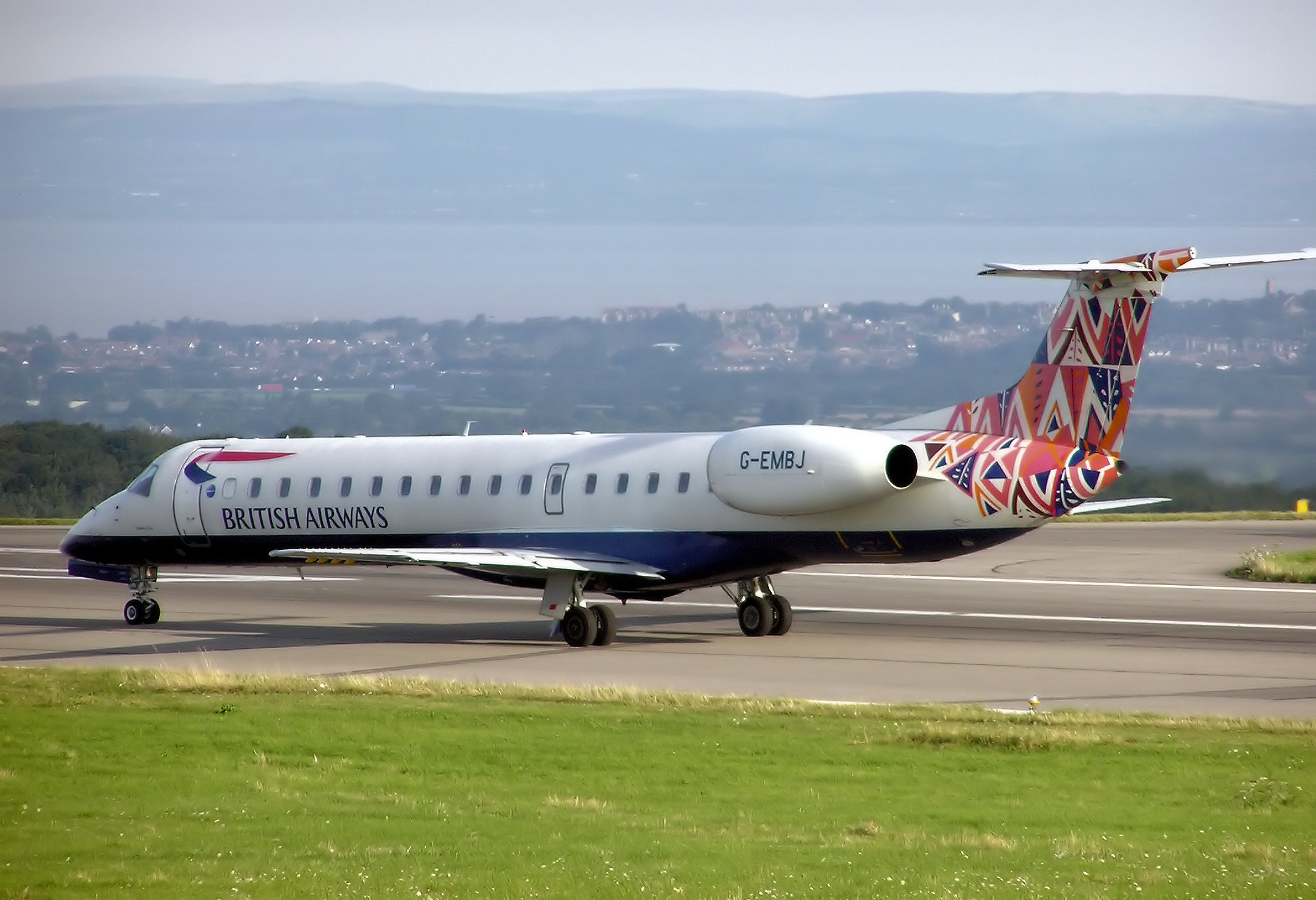
Youm al-Suq (ERJ-145)

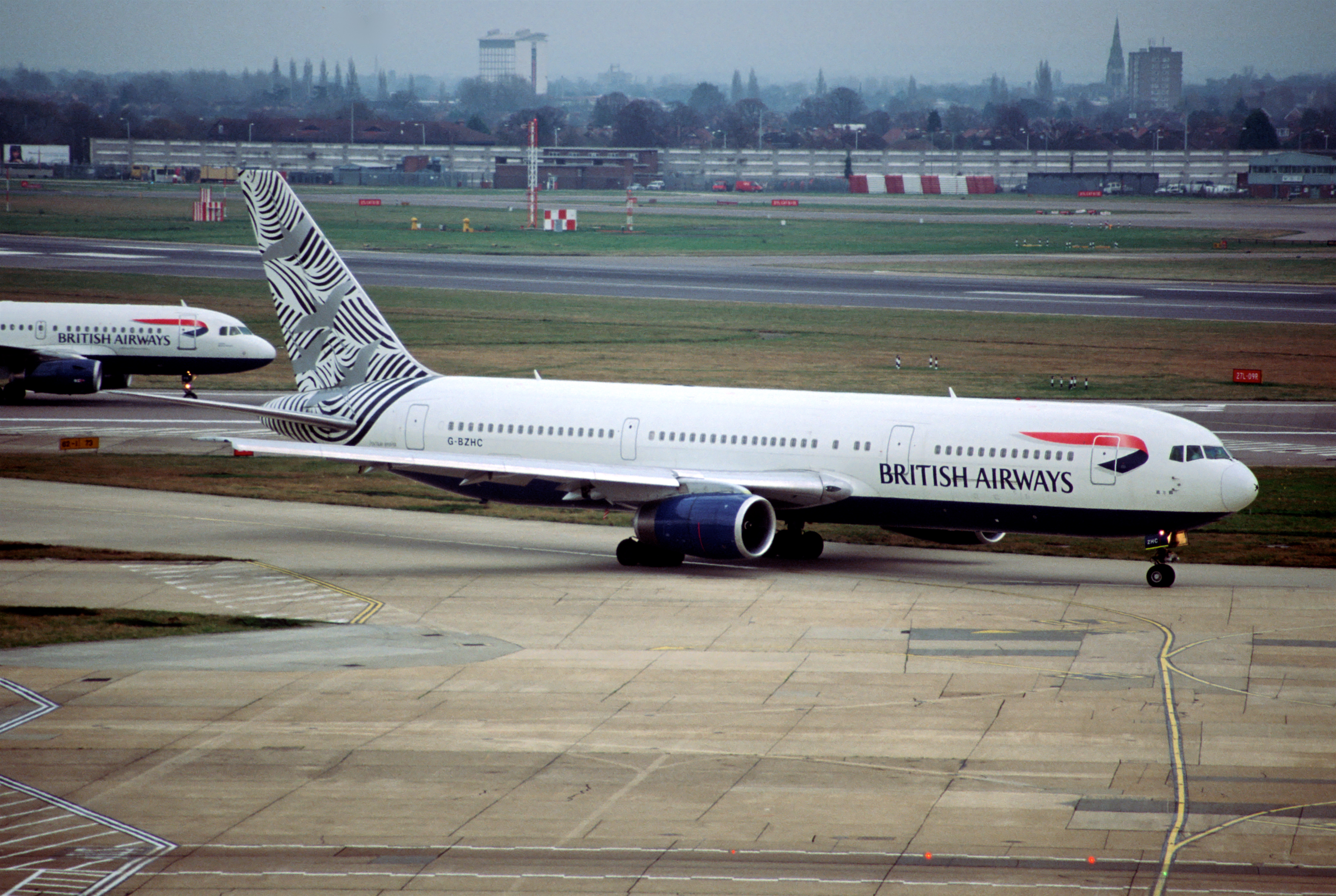
Waves and Cranes (Boeing 767)

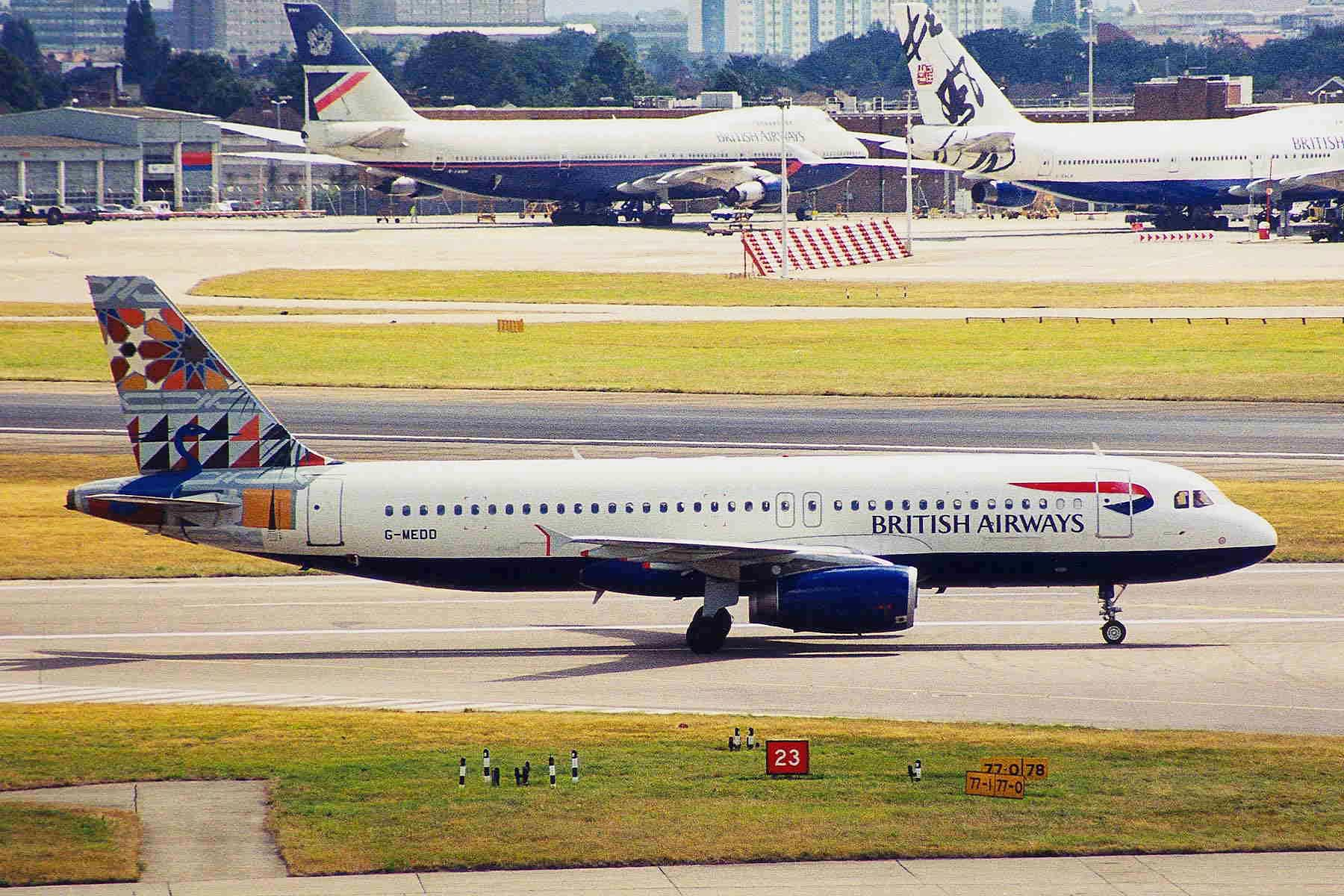
Crossing Borders (Airbus A320)

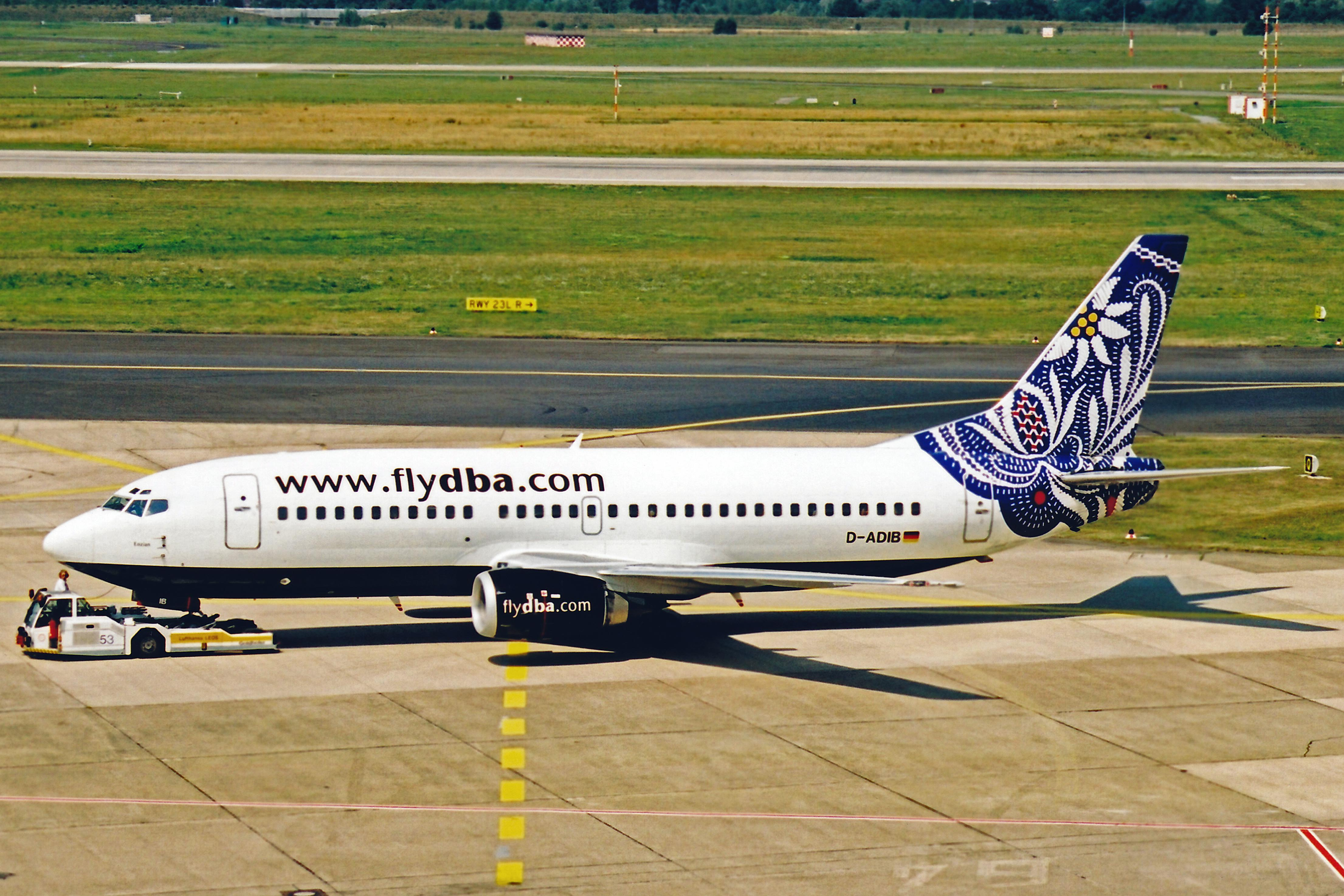
Bavaria (Boeing 737)

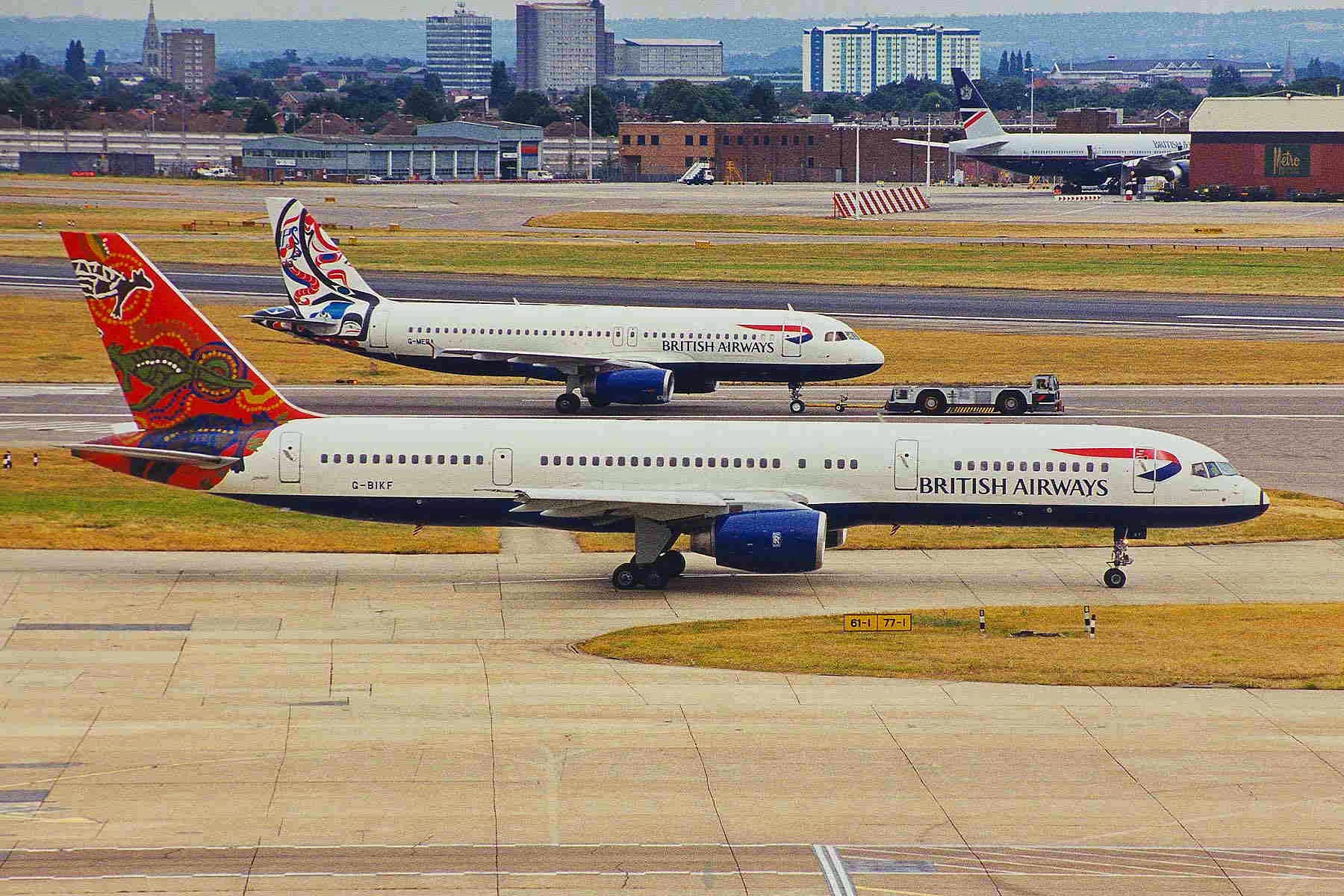
Wunala Dreaming (Boeing 757)

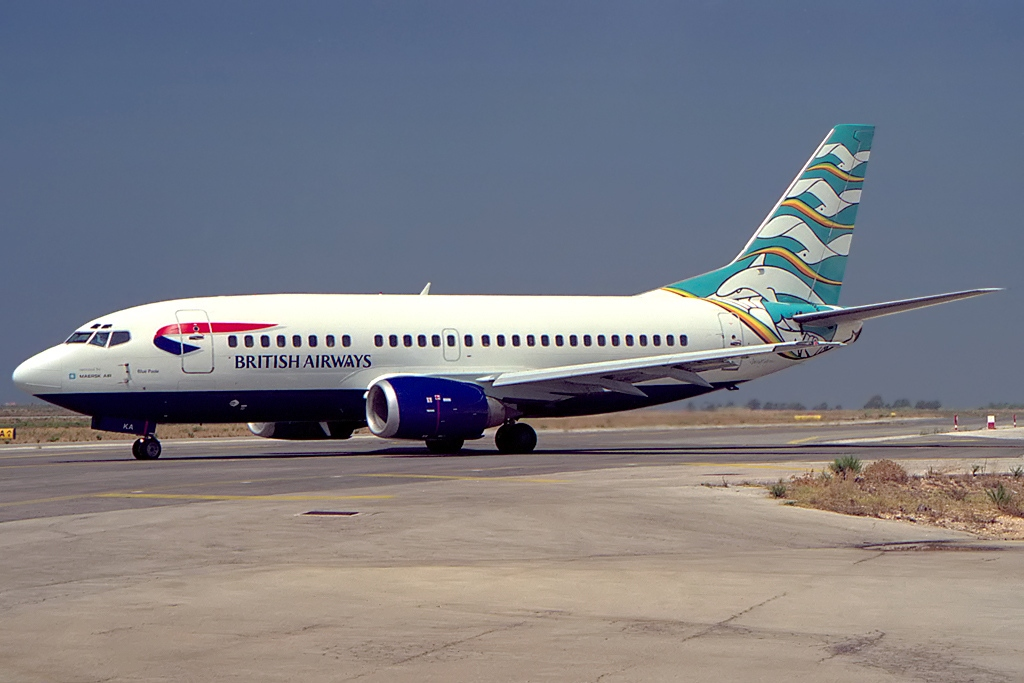
Blue Poole (Boeing 737)

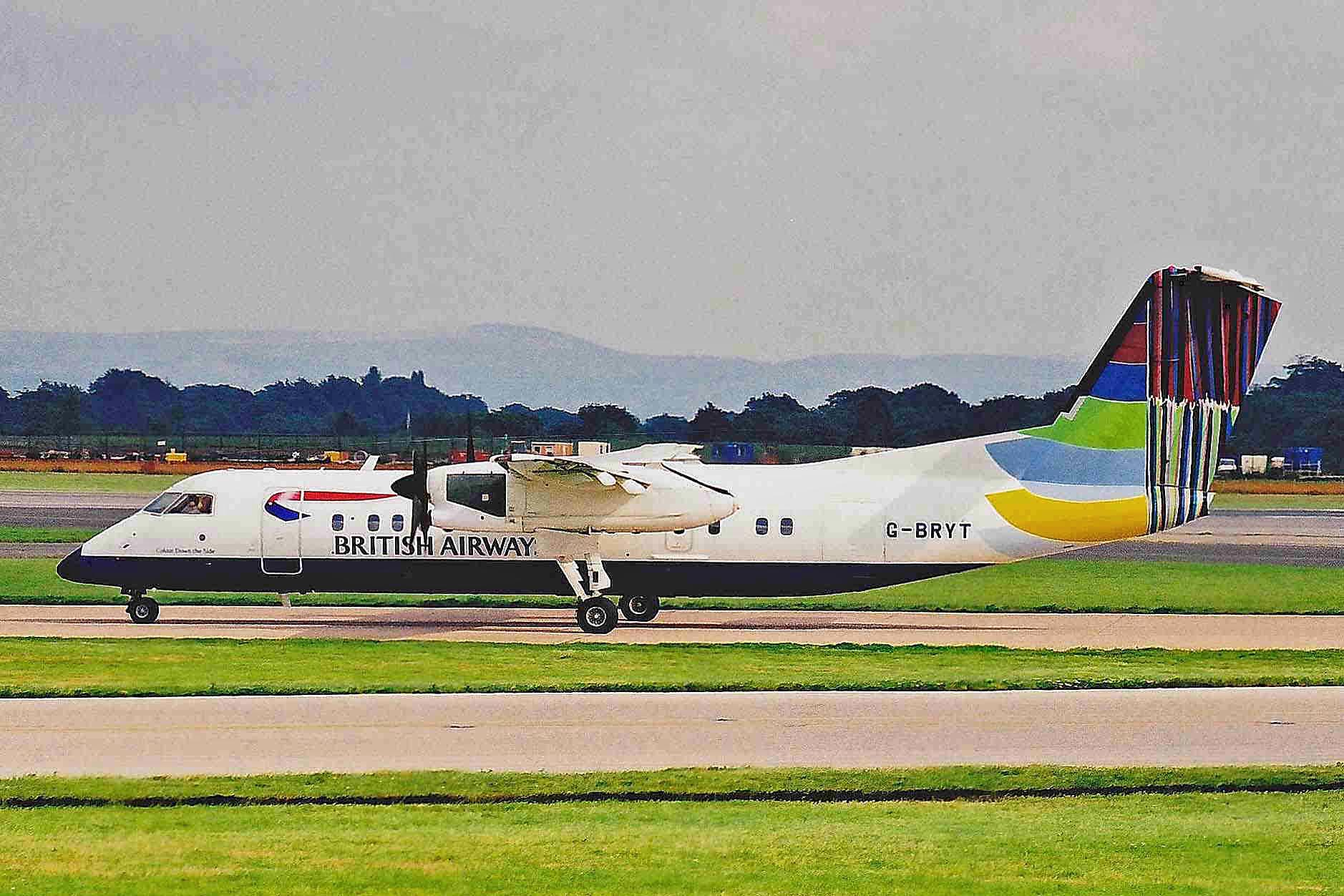
Colour Down the Side (DHC-8)

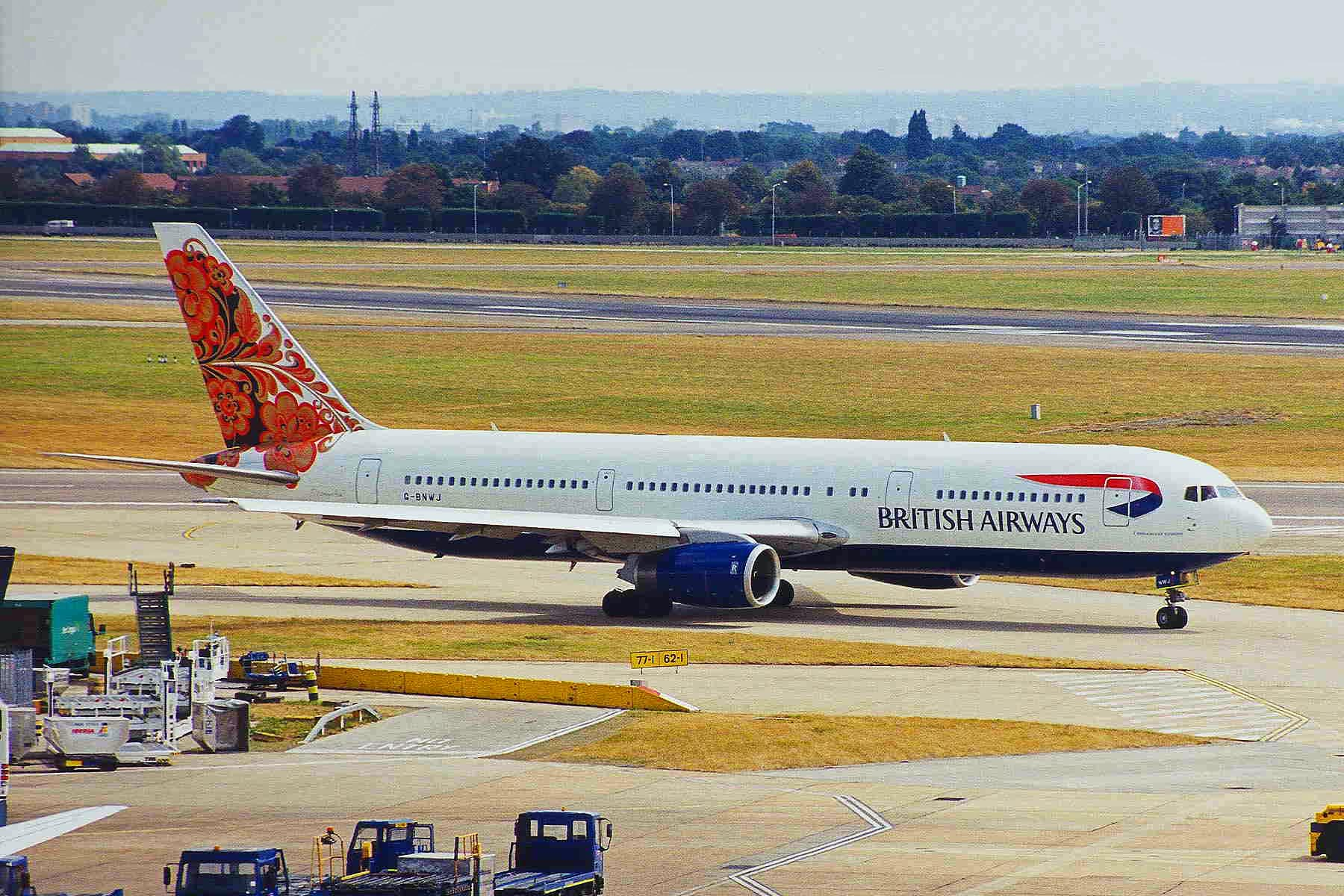
Golden Khokhloma (Boeing 767)

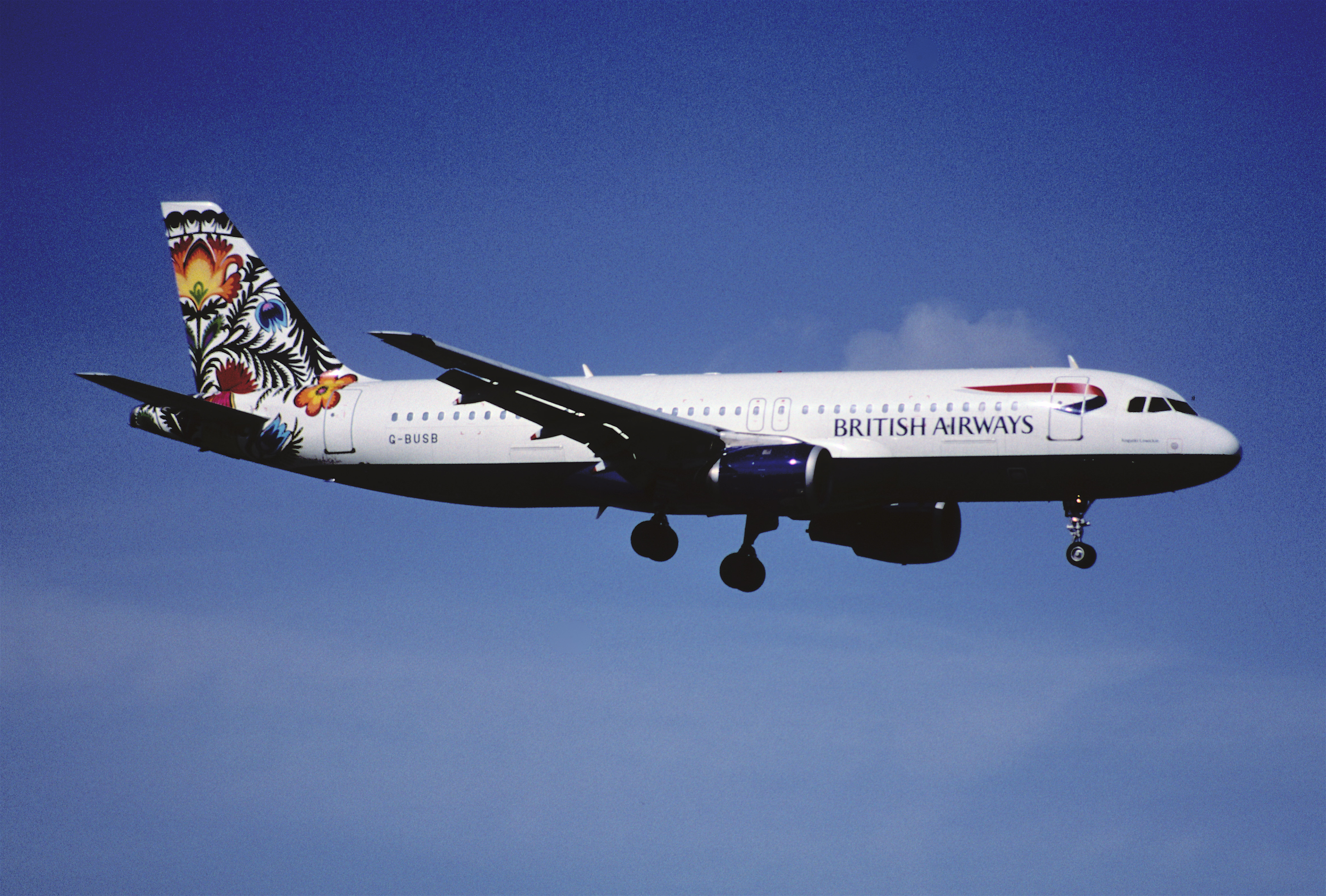
Kogutki Lowickie (Airbus A320)

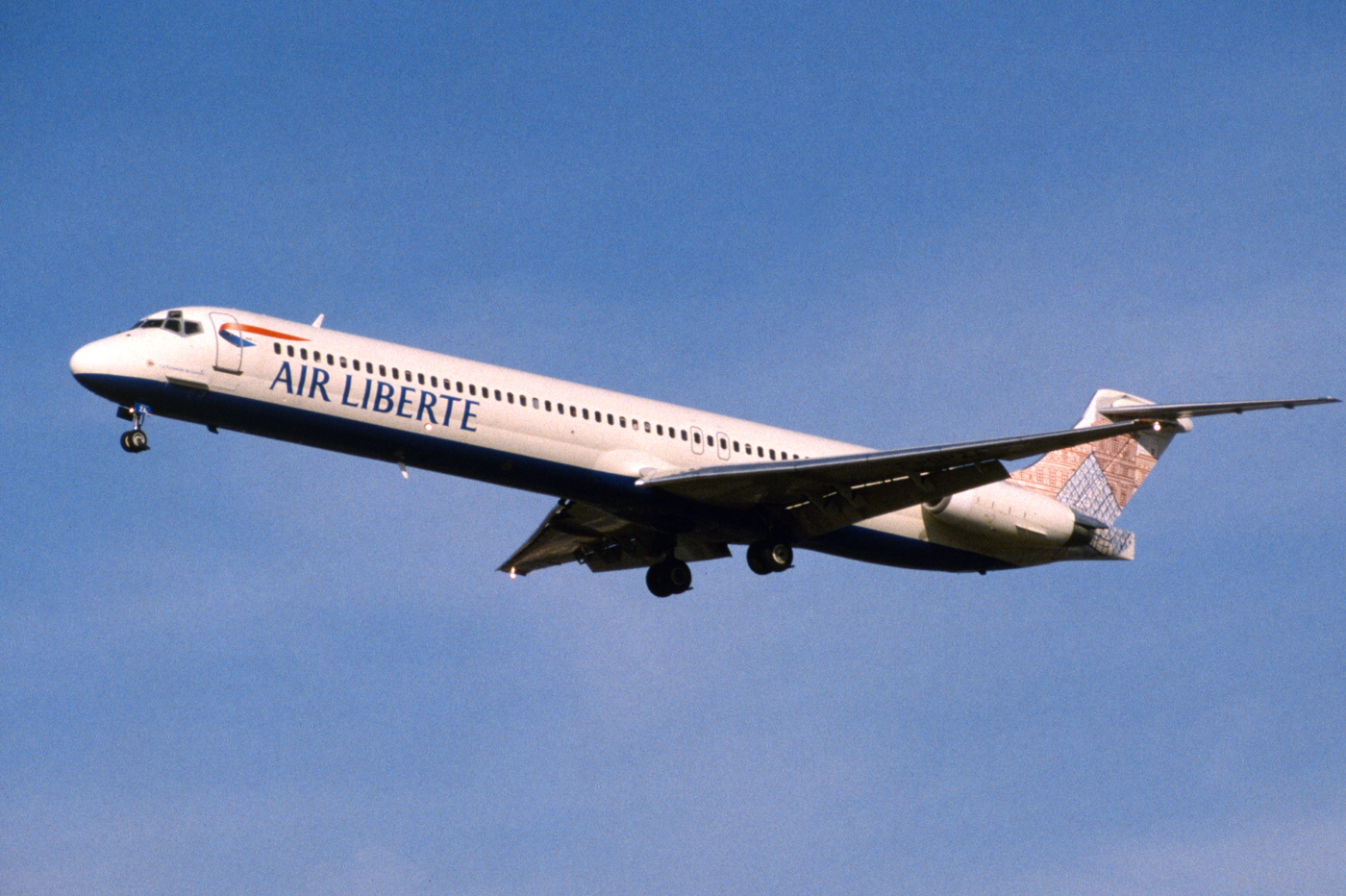
La Pyramide du Louvre (MD-83)

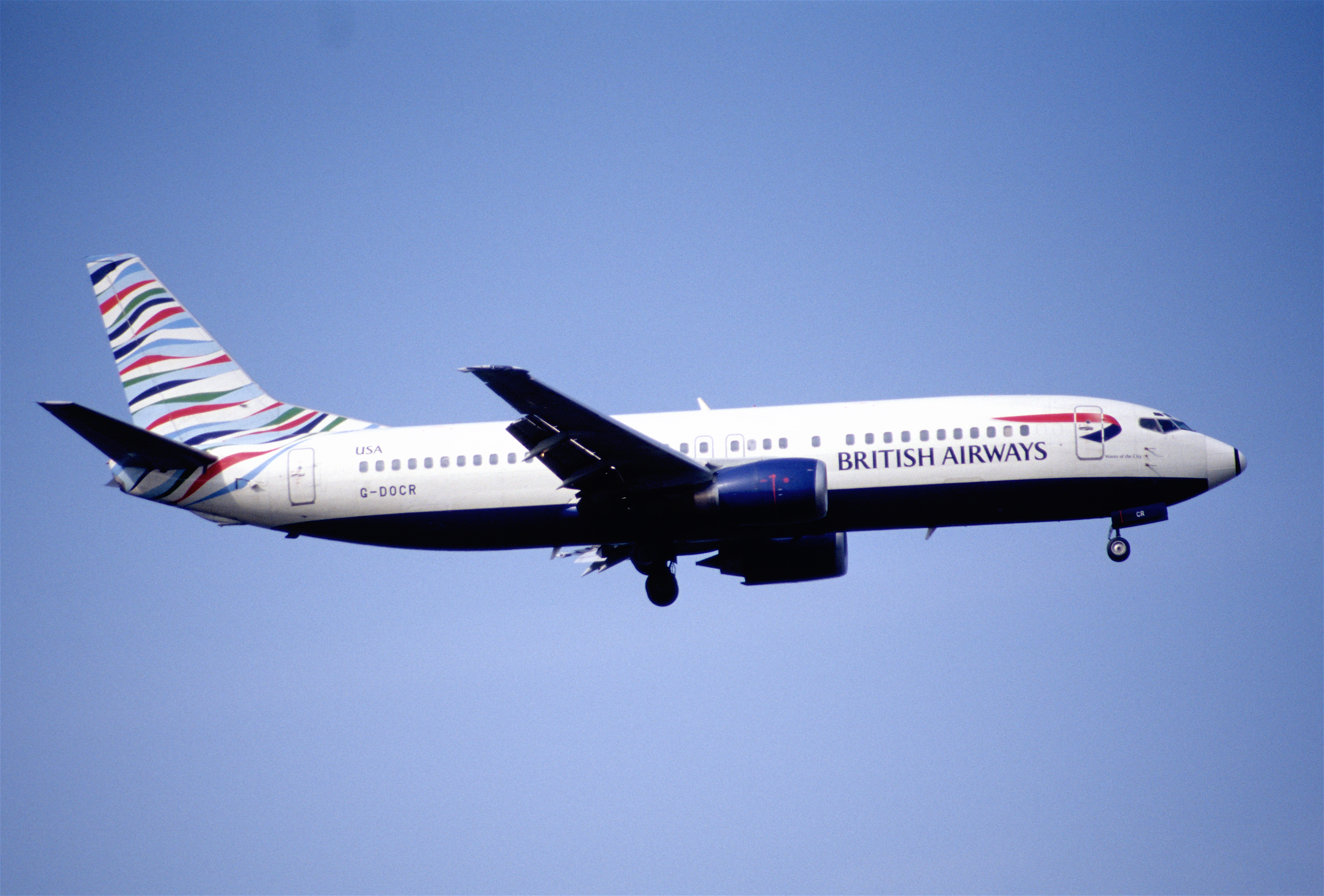
Waves of the City (Boeing 737)

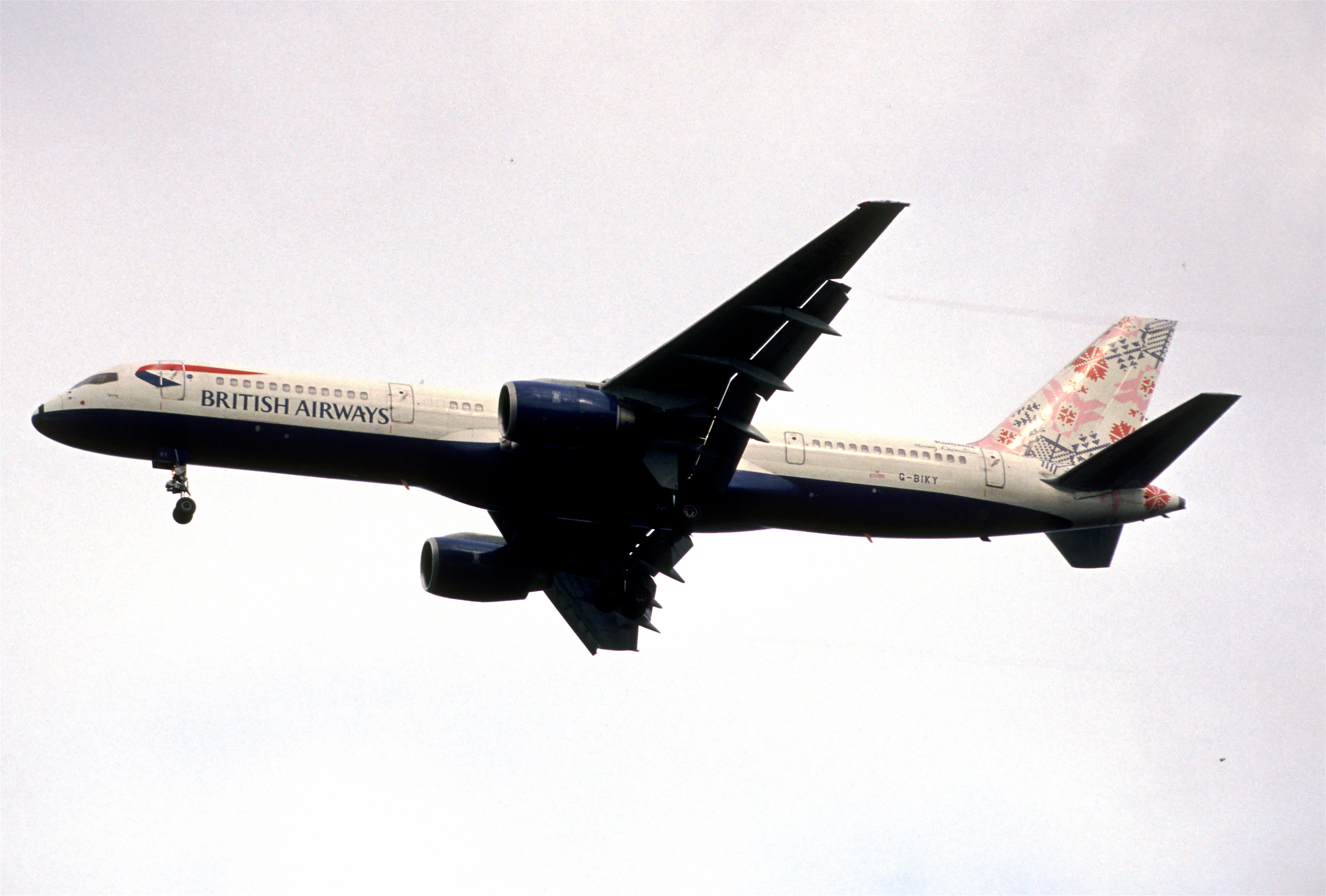
Primăvară (Boeing 757)

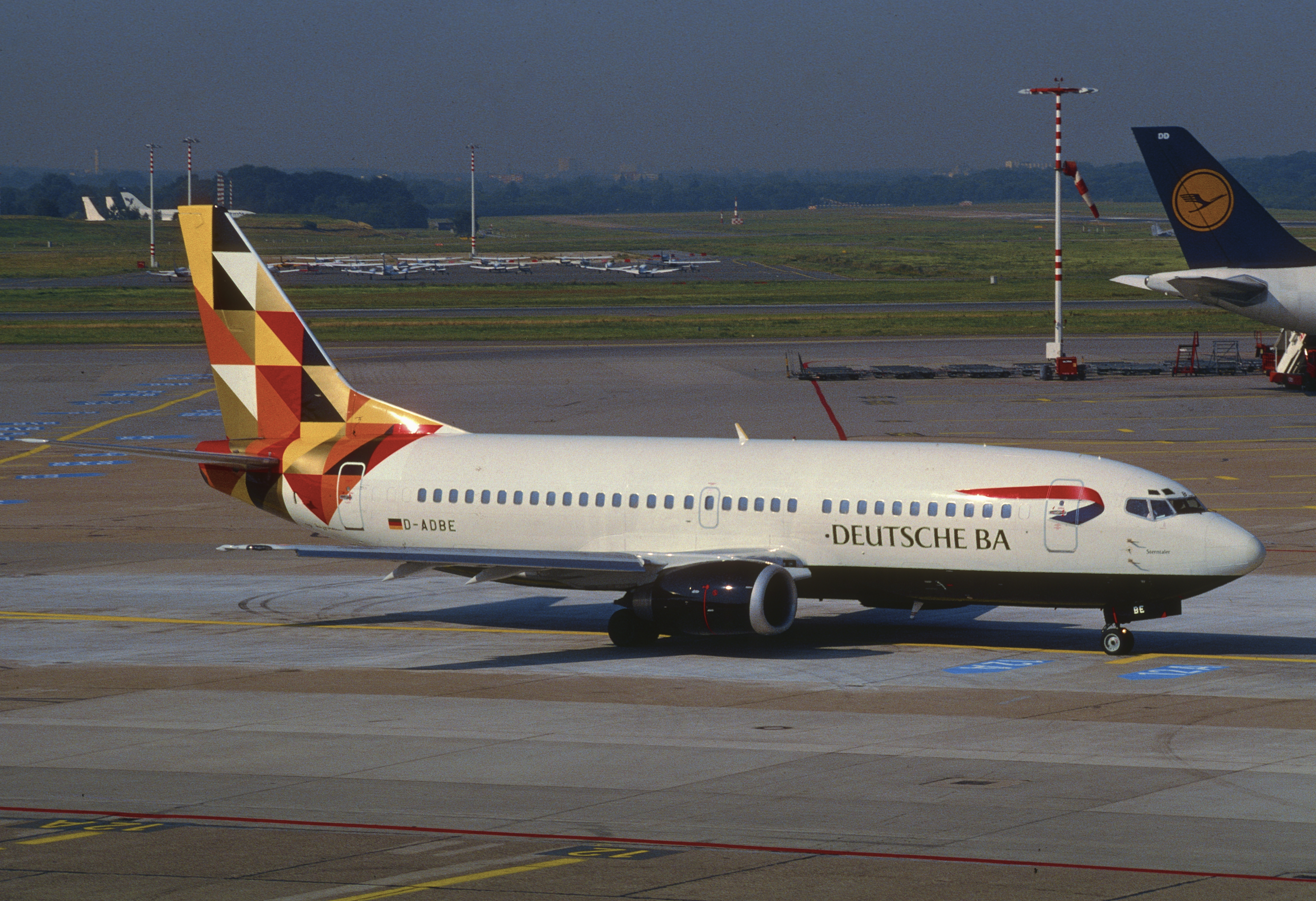
Sterntaler (Boeing 737)

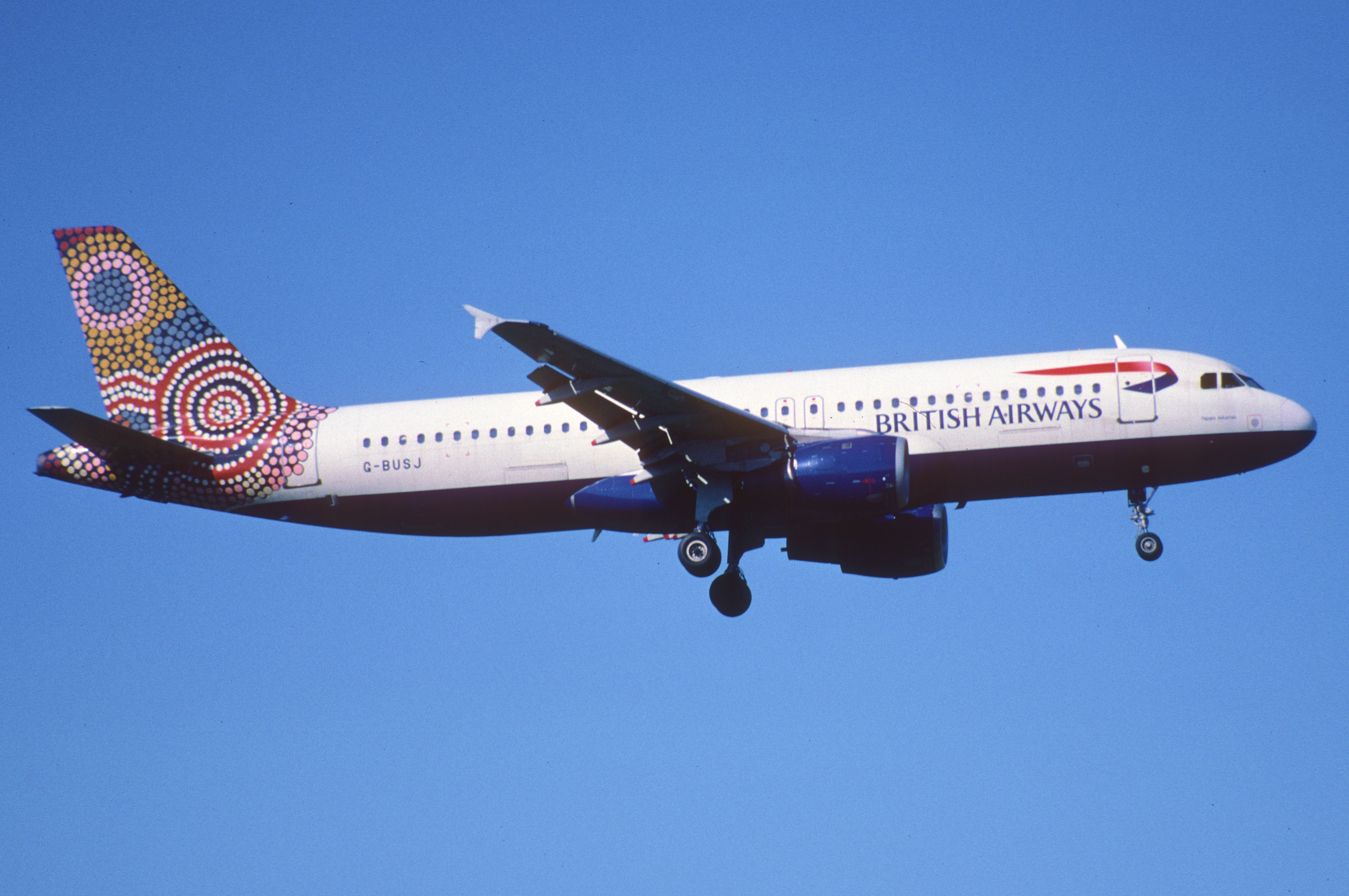
Water Dreaming (Airbus A320)

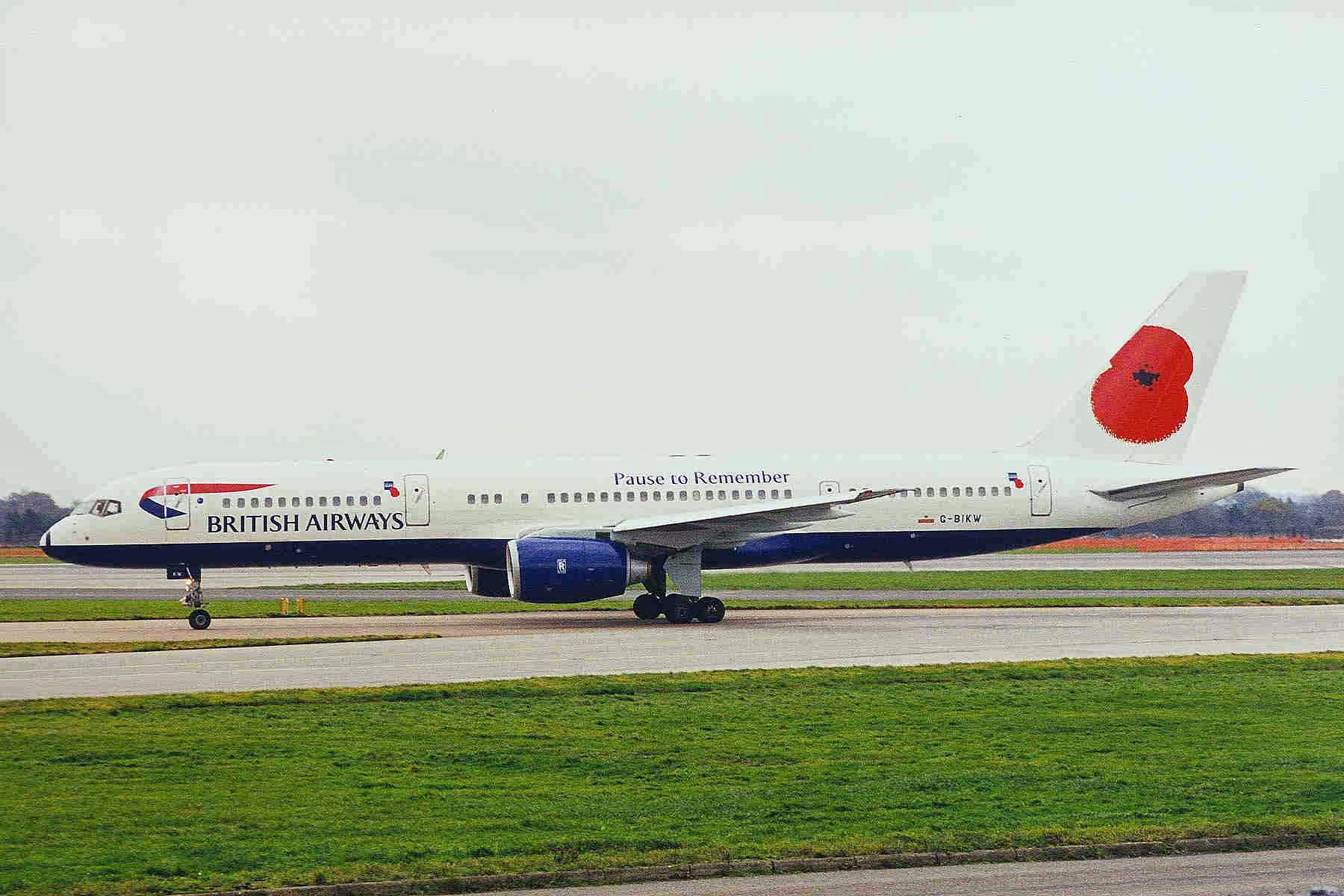
Pause to remember (Boeing 757)

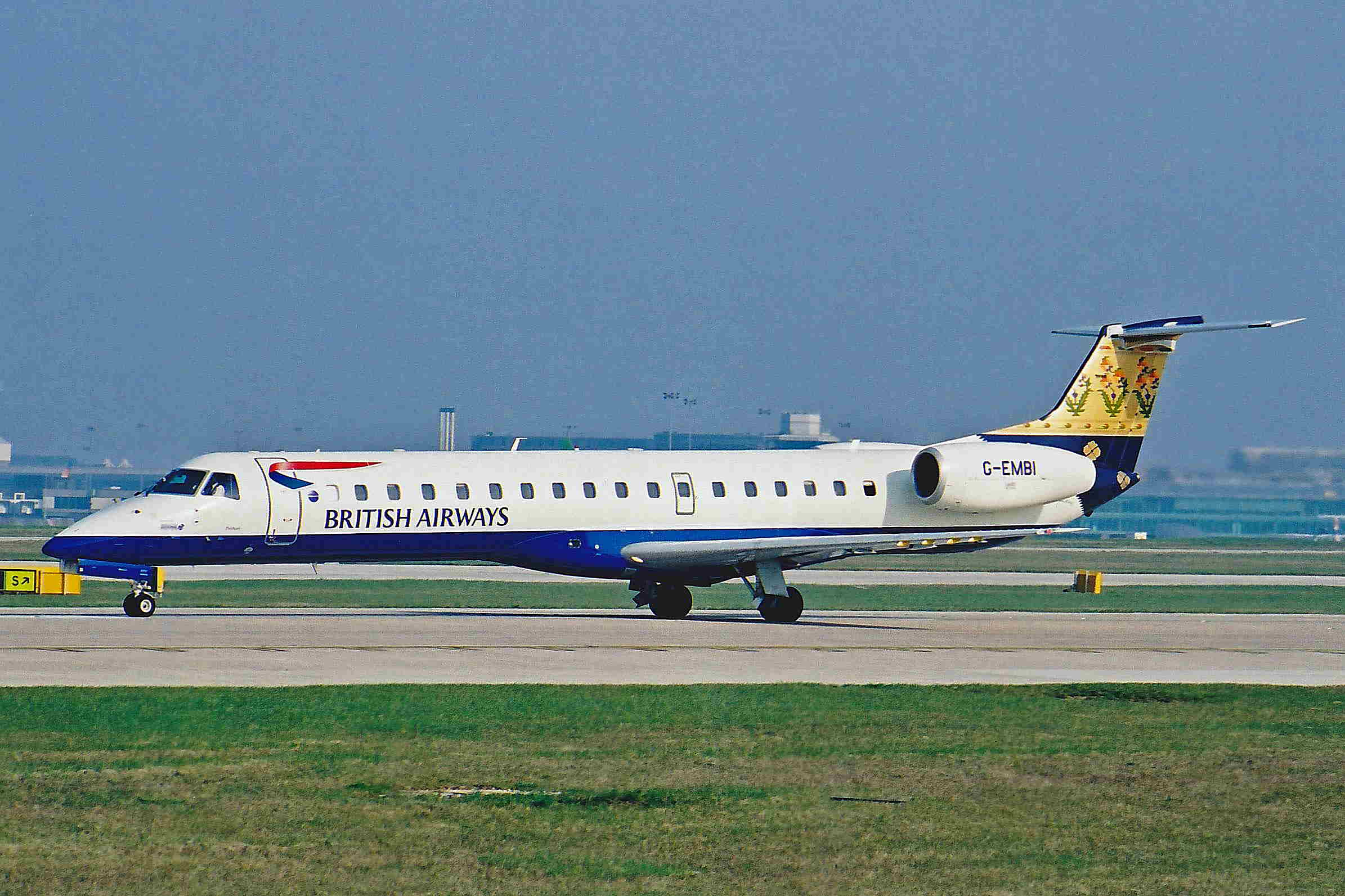
Paithani (ERJ-145)

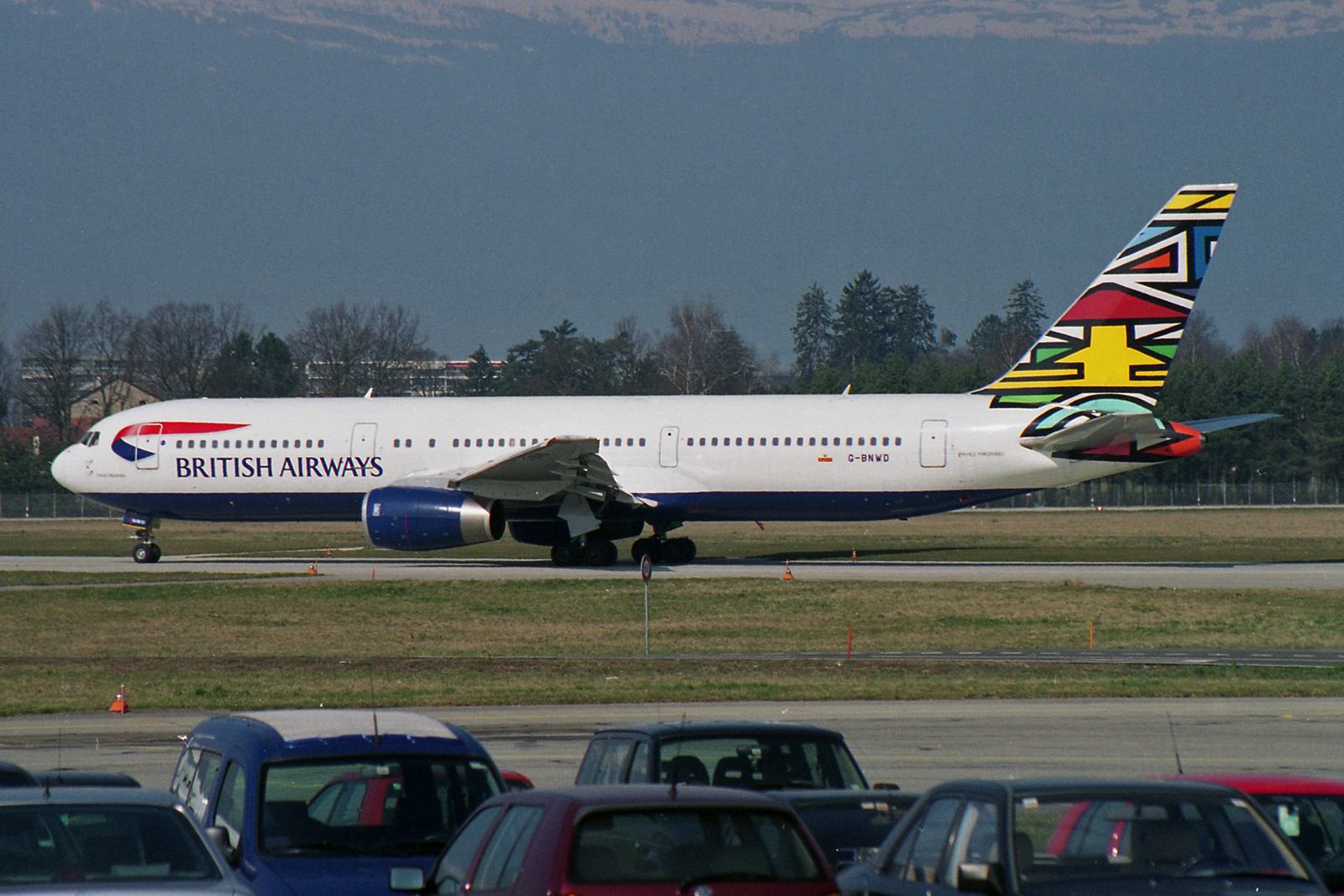
Ndebele Emmly (Boeing 767)

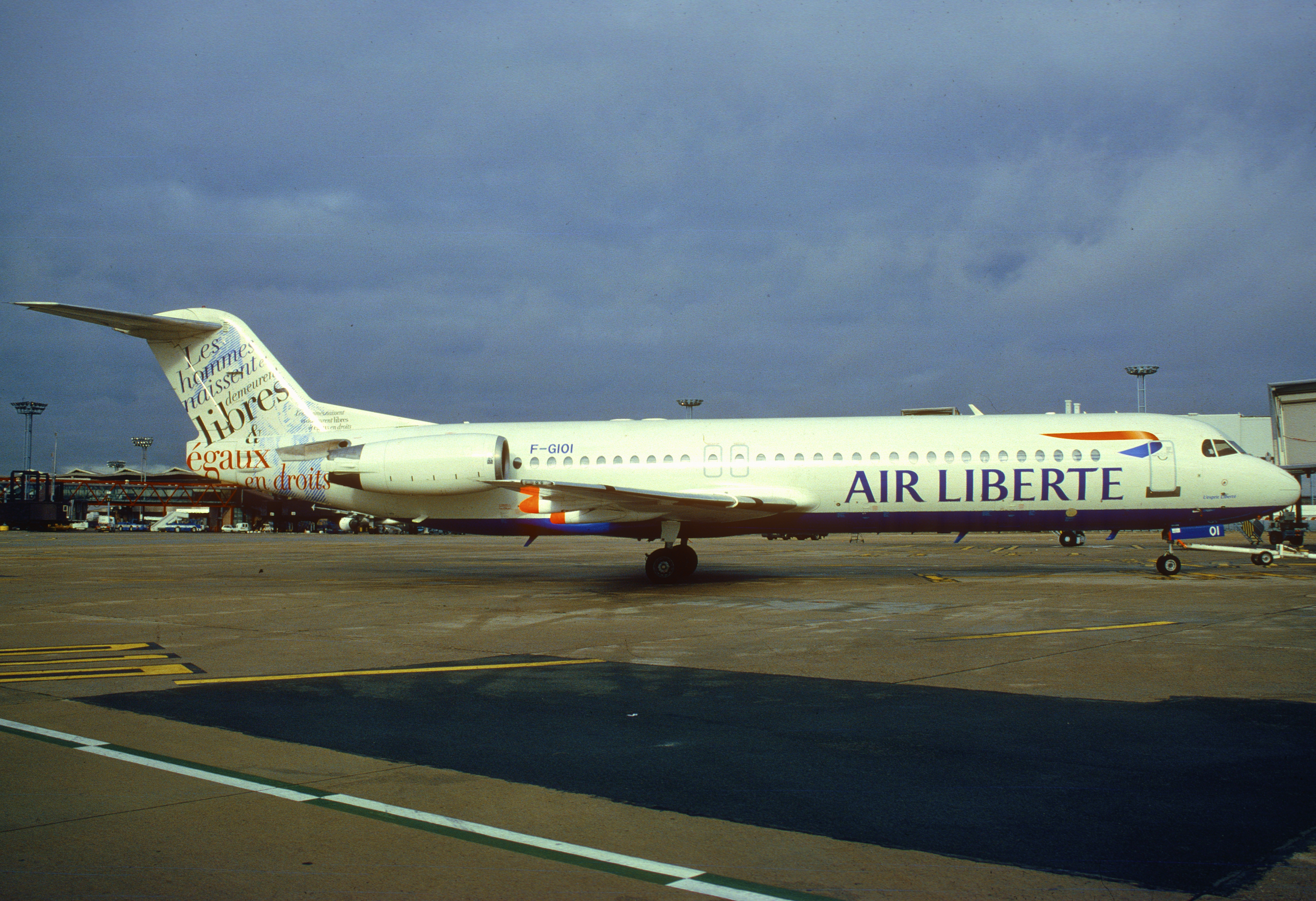
L'esprit Liberté (Fokker 100)

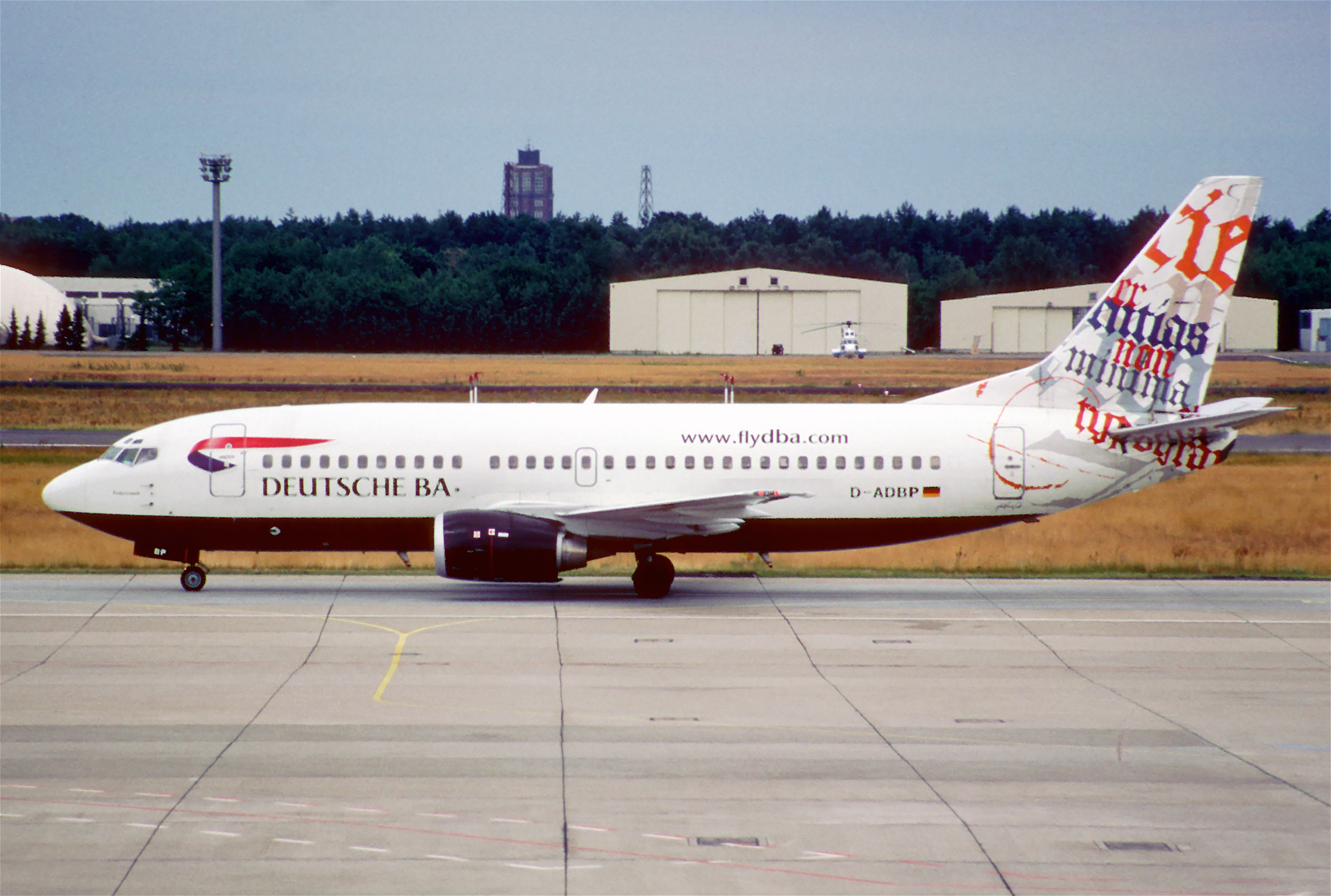
Gothic (Boeing 737)

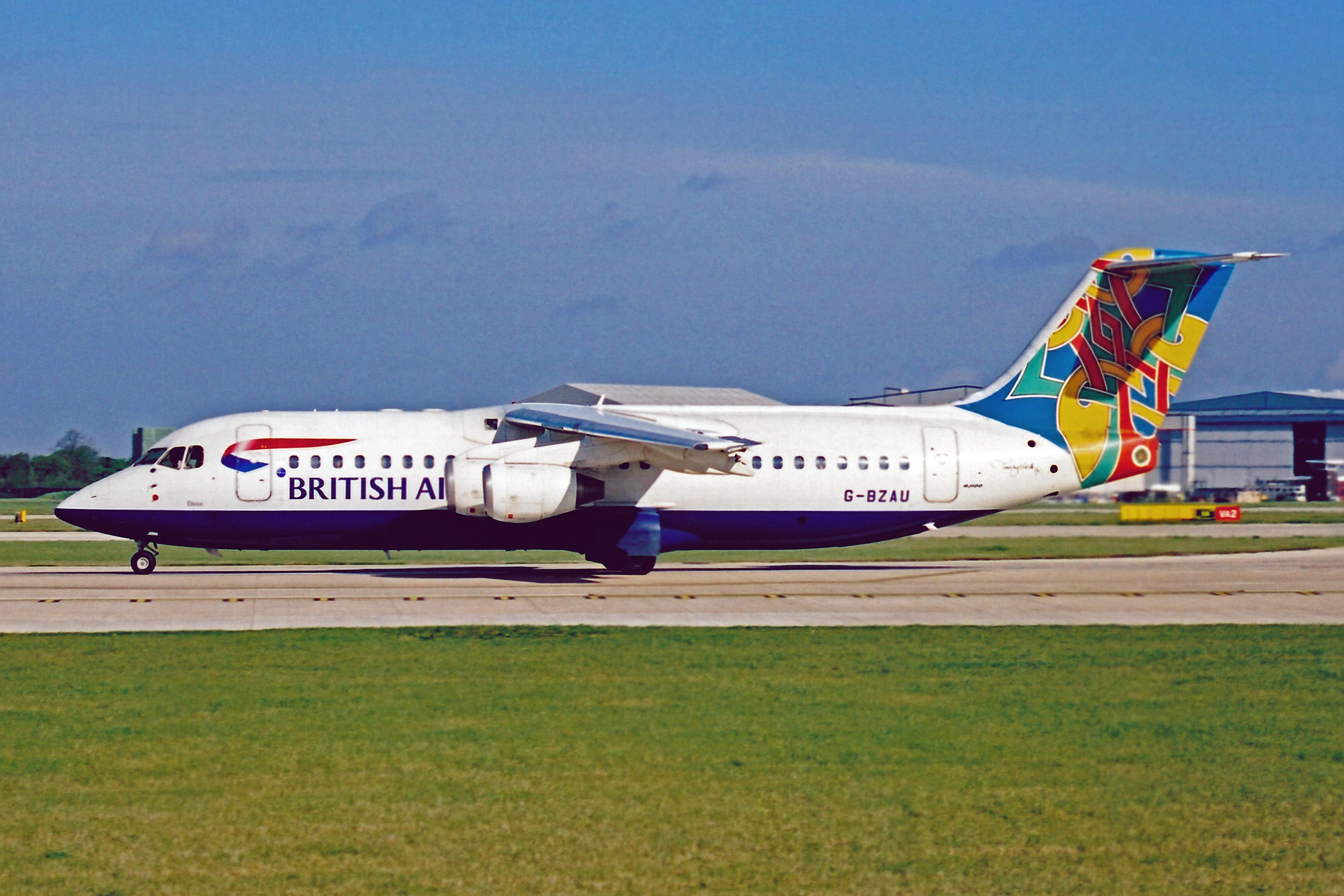
Colum (BAe 146)

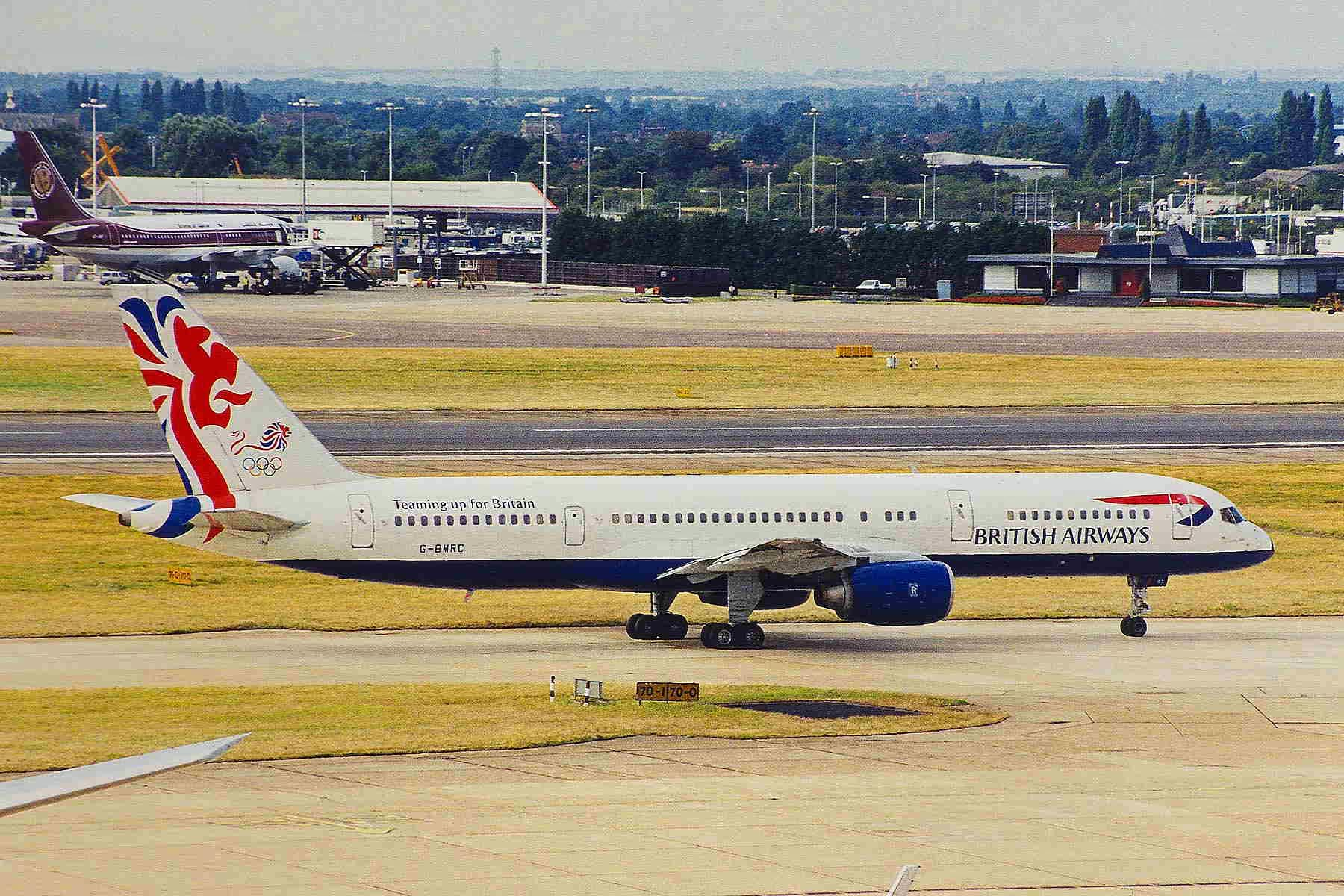
British Olympic Team (Boeing 757)
