= Miracle of the Moose =

Miracle attributed to Russian Orthodox monk, Macarius of Unzha

The Miracle of the Moose (Russian: Чу́до преподо́бного Мака́рия У́нженского о лосе́) is a miracle associated with the name of Venerable Macarius of the Yellow Water Lake and the Unzha (1349–1444), a saint of the Russian Orthodox Church. It is thought to have occurred in June 1439 in the woodlands of what today is the district of Semyonov in Nizhny Novgorod Oblast.

== Account in the Life of Venerable Macarius ==
During the invasion of Russia by Khan Olug Moxammat of Kazan in 1439, Zheltovodsky (Yellow Lake) Monastery of Holy Trinity was destroyed. Venerable Macarius (Russian: Макарий, romanized: Makariy), the founder of the monastery, was taken prisoner, along with a few other survivors. After meeting with Macarius, the khan was so impressed by the nonagenarian abbot's piety and love of his neighbor, that he released him and his disciples, on the condition that they leave the Yellow Lake site.

The Yellow Lake (which was located at the fall of the Kerzhenets into the Volga) being too perilously close to the invasion route taken by the Kazan Khanate armies invading Russian principalities and vice versa, the released survivors decided to relocate a few hundred kilometers to the north, into the vastness of the Galich forests, which are located along the Unzha River in what today is Kostroma Oblast. Taking the easy route along the Volga would not be a safe thing to do in this year of war; so the Saint and his followers choose to travel through the dense woodlands and swamps of the Kerzhenets basin — the land which is, even today, almost deserted by people.

After a few days of travel, the monks ran out of food. One day they somehow managed to capture a moose (some later sources say that the moose had been trapped "at a narrow place", perhaps between trees). The followers of Macarius wanted to slaughter and eat the animal. But as this was the time of the Fast of the Holy Apostles, Venerable Macarius prohibited them to do that. Instead, he told them to cut off the moose's right ear and to release the animal. He told them that they only need to wait for three days, until the Feast of Saints Peter and Paul, and the moose will be theirs. "Don't be aggrieved", said Macarius, "but pray to the Lord. He who fed the people of Israel in the desert with manna for 40 years, can also feed you these days in a manner invisible. Have a strong faith in Him who fed five thousand people, not counting women and children, with five loaves and two fish!"

For the next three days of the fast the travellers marched along without fatigue. No one died of starvation; no one even felt hunger or thought of food. On the Feast day of Holy Apostles Peter and Paul, Venerable Macarius went away from his companions and praised the Lord, praying to Him that His people may be fed as had been the people of Israel in the desert or the five thousand people in the days of Apostles. When Macarius returned to his brethren, they saw the moose with no right ear approaching them. And this time, the animal was not wild: it behaved as if it was tame. After the dinner of bonfire-roasted venison, the travellers praised the Lord for His great kindness. Venerable Macarius told his companions not to worry about food anymore, but rely on God Who will give them food and everything else they need.

The Life of Venerable Macarius does not tell us whether everyone who had left the Yellow Lake with him reached the Unzha alive. But it is said that God had protected them from hunger and from wild beasts during their travel, delivering moose, deer, and other game into their hands.

== Commemoration of the miracle ==
=== Liturgy ===
The Kontakion of the Hymn for the Feast of Venerable Macarius (July 25 O.S.) refers to this miracle when it says of Macarius:

"You were revealed as the second Moses, O Venerable One.
For he divided the sea with a staff,
You have conquered the passions like Amalek,
And you passed through the impassable wilderness with an unwavering mind,
And in it you performed great wonders through your prayers.
You abundantly fed the hungry people."

=== Iconography ===
Depiction of the Miracle of the Moose in Pechersky Ascension Monastery. Note the clipped left ear of the animal: presumably, the fresco depicts the moment when the moose that had been marked by Macarius in this way returned to the Saint and his party

The Miracle of the Moose appears on some of the icons of Venerable Macarius, sometimes as the main topic of the icon, sometimes as one of the episodes. It is also the topic of one of the new frescoes in the Refectory section of the Ascension Cathedral of Pechersky Ascension Monastery in Nizhny Novgorod.

=== Olenevsky Skete ===
The Kerzhenets River woodlands, where the Miracle of the Moose purportedly happened, became in the late 17th century one of the main areas of refuge for the Old Believers. According to their legend, the main community of the Kerzhenets Old Believers, known as the Olenevsky Skete (Russian: Оленевский скит) had been founded soon after the Miracle of the Moose by some of the monks expelled from Venerable Macarius' Yellow Waters Monastery, at the site where the animal was captured by the Venerable's prayers. The skete's name comes from Russian olen (олень), which means "deer", thus commemorating the miracle. It is said that during the Raskol two hundred years later the Skete's hermits rejected Nikon's reforms, thus making it the center of attraction for Old Believer refugees from other parts of the country, who then founded numerous other sketes in the area.

Olenevsky Skete was one of the centers of the so-called Beglopopovtsy ("those who accepted the fleeing priests"), the school of Old Believers who thought that, since the Old Believers had no bishops of their own who could ordain priest, it was acceptable for them to accept priests who had been ordained by the established church but later left it for the Old Believier sketes. It is reported that the Skete was mostly destroyed during one of the Old Believer suppression campaigns in 1737, but restored after Catherine II's "amnesty" of 1762. It was known as a women's skete, with 49 nuns reported as living there at the time of its official closure in 1854, pursuant to Nicholas I anti-skete executive order of 1853. A number of nuns in fact continued to live at the site long after the official disbandment.

The former skete is now known as the village of Bolshoye Olenevo, and is located 24 km south-east of the town of Semyonov (Nizhny Novgorod Oblast). It remains the site of pilgrimage for the Old Believers of the area.

== Sources ==
- The Life of Venerable Macarius, at the site of Pechersky Ascencion Monastery (in Russian)

=== Iconography ===
- Venerable Macarius' Miracle of the Moose, fresco at the Ascension Cathedral in Pechersky Ascension Monastery.
- Venerable Macarius' Miracle with the Moose (Чудо преподобного Макария с лосем), first part (icon, Kotlovka Gallery)
- Venerable Macarius' Miracle with the Moose (Чудо преподобного Макария с лосем), second part (icon, Kotlovka Gallery)
- An icon of Venerable Macarius (at the Orthodox Calendar site). The Miracle of the Moose is shown as the bottom left episode.
