= Kerzhenets (disambiguation) =

The Kerzhenets is a river in Nizhny Novgorod Oblast, Russia

Kerzhenets may also refer to:

- Kerzhenets, Bor, a village in the urban district of Bor, Nizhny Novgorod Oblast, Russia
- Kerzhenets, Semyonov, a village in the urban district of Semyonov, Nizhny Novgorod Oblast, Russia
