= Feast of Saints Peter and Paul =

Annual liturgical feast on 29 June

Solemnity of Saints Peter and Paul
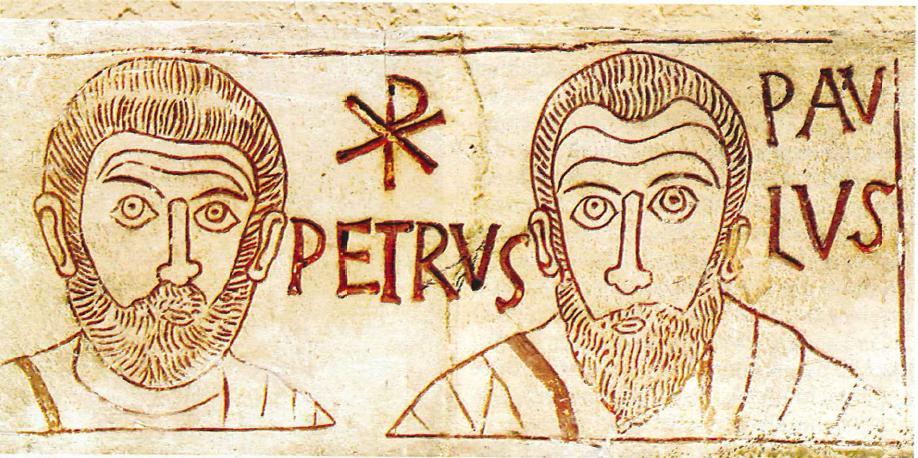
- Peter and Paul, depicted in a 4th century etching with their names in Latin and the Chi-Rho
- Observed by: Christianity (in the Catholic Church, Eastern Orthodox Church, Church of England, Lutheranism, Oriental Orthodox Churches, and Spiritual Christianity)
- Liturgical color: Red
- Celebrations: Christian liturgies: Mass (in the Latin Catholic Church, Lutheranism, and the Church of England); Divine Liturgy (in the Eastern Orthodox Church, Eastern Catholic Churches, and the Oriental Orthodox Churches)
- Date: 29 June
- Next time: 29 June 2027
- Frequency: Annual

The Feast of Saints Peter and Paul or Solemnity of Saints Peter and Paul honors the martyrdom of the apostles Saint Peter and Saint Paul in Rome and is liturgically observed on 29 June. The celebration is of ancient Christian origin, the date selected being the anniversary of either their death or the translation of their relics.

== Eastern Christianity ==
For Eastern Orthodox and some Eastern Catholic Christians this feast also marks the end of the Apostles' Fast (which began on the Monday following All Saints' Sunday, i.e., the second Monday after Pentecost). While not considered among the twelve great feasts, it is one of five additional feasts ranked as a great feast in the Eastern Orthodox tradition and is often celebrated with an all-night vigil starting the evening before. In the Julian calendar, 29 June falls on the Gregorian calendar date of 12 July from 1900 to 2099, inclusive.

In the Russian Orthodox tradition, Macarius of Unzha's Miracle of the Moose is said to have occurred during the Apostles' Fast and the Feast of Saints Peter and Paul that followed it.

=== Oriental Orthodox tradition ===
In the Coptic Orthodox Church and the Ethiopian Orthodox Tewahedo Church, the feast of saints Peter and Paul is also celebrated on the day 5 Epip which is also the end of the fast of the apostles in these traditions.

=== Spiritual Christian tradition ===
Although the Canadian Doukhobors, a Spiritual Christian denomination, do not venerate saints, the Feast of St. Peter and St. Paul has traditionally been a day of celebration for them. Since 1895, it has acquired a new significance as a commemoration of the "Burning of the Arms", the Doukhobors' destruction of their weapons, as a symbol of their refusal to participate in government-sponsored killing. It is celebrated now by their descendants as simply "Peter's Day" (Russian: Petro den.), sometimes referred to as the "Doukhobor Peace Day".

== Western Christian tradition ==
In the General Roman Calendar, the celebration is a solemnity. The feast is first mentioned in the Roman calendar of 354. In earlier editions, it was ranked as a Double (Tridentine calendar), Double of the First Class (e.g., General Roman Calendar of 1954), or First-Class Feast (General Roman Calendar of 1960). Prior to the liturgical reforms of Pope Pius XII, this feast was followed by a common octave. On this feast, newly created metropolitan archbishops receive from the pope the primary symbol of their office, the pallium.

It is a holy day of obligation in the Latin Church, although individual conferences of bishops can suppress the obligation. The Enchiridion Indulgentiarum of 2004 grants a partial indulgence to the faithful who devoutly recite the prayer in honor of the apostles on the Solemnity, and a plenary indulgence to those who devoutly use a sacramental blessed by a bishop, provided they make a valid profession of faith during its use.

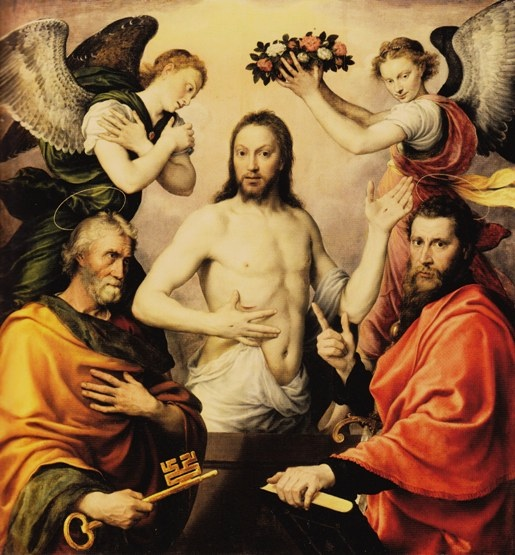
A painting of Risen Jesus Christ surrounded by Ss. Peter and Paul and two angels

In England, Scotland, and Wales, as in most of the world, the Latin Church continues to observe the feast as a holy day of obligation; however, in the United States and Canada, it has not been observed as a holy day of obligation since 1840.

The Church of England celebrates 29 June as a festival. The Lutheran churches celebrate it in the rank of a lesser festival.

Because of the importance of Sts. Peter and Paul to the Catholic Church, many Catholic-majority countries observe their feast day as a public holiday. The feast is observed in Rome because St. Paul and St. Peter are patron saints of the Eternal City. In the Apulia region of southeastern Italy, the feast has been associated with the Tarantella dance since the Middle Ages.

In Malta, the solemnity is a public holiday and in Maltese is known as L-Imnarja. It is celebrated with festivals the preceding weekend in Nadur Gozo and as well as Buskett Gardens in Rabat.

It is also a public holiday of the Canton of Ticino, Switzerland, as well as parts of the Swiss cantons of Lucerne and Graubünden. It is a public holiday in Peru and in various municipalities of the Philippines. In Ormoc, festivals, bazaars, parades, and pageants are held annually on the feast day, as Peter and Paul are the city's patron saints.

In 1577, Jan Rubens named his son Peter Paul, because he was born during the office of vespers of this day.

== See also ==
- Golowan Festival
- Incident at Antioch, a dispute between Peter and Paul
- International Day of Prayer for the Persecuted Church
