= 1439 =

1439 in various calendars
- Gregorian calendar: 1439; MCDXXXIX
- Ab urbe condita: 2192
- Armenian calendar: 888; ԹՎ ՊՁԸ
- Assyrian calendar: 6189
- Balinese saka calendar: 1360–1361
- Bengali calendar: 845–846
- Berber calendar: 2389
- English Regnal year: 17 Hen. 6 – 18 Hen. 6
- Buddhist calendar: 1983
- Burmese calendar: 801
- Byzantine calendar: 6947–6948
- Chinese calendar: 戊午年 (Earth Horse); 4136 or 3929 — to — 己未年 (Earth Goat); 4137 or 3930
- Coptic calendar: 1155–1156
- Discordian calendar: 2605
- Ethiopian calendar: 1431–1432
- Hebrew calendar: 5199–5200
- Hindu calendars
- Vikram Samvat: 1495–1496
- Shaka Samvat: 1360–1361
- Kali Yuga: 4539–4540
- Holocene calendar: 11439
- Igbo calendar: 439–440
- Iranian calendar: 817–818
- Islamic calendar: 842–843
- Japanese calendar: Eikyō 11 (永享１１年)
- Javanese calendar: 1354–1355
- Julian calendar: 1439; MCDXXXIX
- Korean calendar: 3772
- Minguo calendar: 473 before ROC 民前473年
- Nanakshahi calendar: −29
- Thai solar calendar: 1981–1982
- Tibetan calendar: ས་ཕོ་རྟ་ལོ་ (male Earth-Horse); 1565 or 1184 or 412 — to — ས་མོ་ལུག་ལོ་ (female Earth-Sheep); 1566 or 1185 or 413

June 29: The Miracle of the Moose takes place (modern fresco in Pechersky Ascension Monastery)

.

Year 1439 (MCDXXXIX) was a common year starting on Thursday of the Julian calendar.

== Events ==
=== January–March ===
- January 4 – A truce is signed at Breslau between King Albert of Hungary and King Casimir IV Jagiellon of Poland to end the 8-month war between the two kingdoms.
- January 9 – A rebellion by peasants in Finland against the Swedish government, led by Anian Daavid, is ended by the Swedish Army after intervention by the Bishop of Turku. After confiscation of some untillable land to compensate other landowners for damages, the peasants are pardoned upon taking an oath never to rise up against the Swedish Crown again.
- January 10 – Pope Eugene IV, who had convened the Council of Ferrara a year earlier to fight the reforms of the Council of Basel, orders the transfer of its participants from Ferrara to Florence.
- January 17 – As part of Ming China's campaign against the Möng Mao kingdom in south China, General Fang Zheng, commander of 295,000 troops, attacks the stockade of the Mao kingdom's General Si Renfa and forces the enemy to retreat southward, after which he continues in pursuit. However, by this time his troops are exhausted and his supply lines are cut off. He requests reinforcements, but Mu Sheng sends only a small number as he is angry that Fang Zheng has disobeyed orders. Fang Zheng is then defeated at Kongni where he has pursued Si Renfa, and "fell into an ambush of the elephant phalanx of his enemy", at which point he orders his son to escape, and dies with his troops
- January 20 – In England, John Juyn becomes the new Chief Justice of the King's Bench.
- January – In Vietnam, a rebellion of the barbarians in Phục Lễ province, supported by the Laotian army, against King Lê Thái Tông under the Lê dynasty, is defeated.
- February 17 – In the Duchy of Cieszyn in Poland, Duke Wenceslaus I marries Elisabeth of Hohenzollern, the daughter of the Elector of Brandenburg, Friedrich.
- March 19 – Aedh mac Tairdelbach becomes the new King of Connacht (in modern-day County Roscommon) in Ireland upon the death of his nephew, Cathal mac Ruaidri Ó Conchobair, who had been King of Connacht since 1426.
- March 26 – Meeting in Germany, the Diet of Mainz, summoned by the new Holy Roman Emperor, Frederick III, to consider the case of Pope Eugene IV, votes to deprive Eugene of his authority within the Empire and to elect a new Diet to meet in Frankfurt in 1440.

=== April–June ===
- April 12 – In a battle on Lake Garda in Italy, a passage to the Adriatic Sea, ships from the Duchy of Milan defeat those of the Republic of Venice in battle and take control of the lake.
- May 6 – Battle of Grotnik: Wladyslaw III's royal army defeats the Hussite rebels, led by Spytko III of Melsztyn, ending the non-Catholic movement in Poland.
- May 16 – Pope Eugene, already found to be in contempt of the Council of Basel, is declared by the Council to be a heretic.
- June 10 – Joseph II, the leader of the Eastern Orthodox Church as the 155th Ecumenical Patriarch of Constantinople, dies after a reign of 23 years, leaving a vacancy that is used by the Roman Catholic Pope Eugene IV to declare a unification of the two churches to end the East–West Schism of 1054.
- June 24 – Sigismund of Habsburg becomes the new Duke of Austria upon the death of his father, Frederick IV.
- June 25 – The Council of Basel formally declares that Pope Eugene IV is deposed.
- June – The "Miracle of the Moose" takes place, according to Russian hagiographers.

=== July–September ===
- July 6 – Pope Eugene IV issues the Bull of Union with the Greeks (Laetentur Caeli), signed by the Byzantine Emperor John VIII Palaiologos, proclaiming the end of the East–West Schism between Roman Catholicism and Eastern Orthodoxy and the union of the two divisions of the Christian faith. The bull is repudiated by most Eastern bishops shortly thereafter.
- July 9 – The Battle of Craignaught Hill takes place in Scotland between Clan Boyd and Clan Stewart as the Stewarts of Darnley carry out revenge against Sir Thomas Boyd for his murder of Alan Stewart.
- July 13 – The siege of Moscow by Ulugh Muhammad, the monarch of the Kazan Khanate, fails after 10 days following the defense of the Muscovite capital by Yuri Patrikeevich.
- August 18 – Smederevo Fortress, the seat of government of the Despotate of Serbia, surrenders to the Ottoman Empire after a siege of three months under the command of the Sultan Murad II. The siege had started after the Despot, Durad Branković, had departed to the Republic of Venice, leaving the nation under the control of his son, Grgur Branković. Grgur is appointed as the Ottoman Governor of the Serbian province.
- August 28 – Pope Eugene IV sends a message of unity to the Emperor of Ethiopia, Qostantinos I, but the proposal for a union with the Ethiopian Orthodox Christian Church is not acknowledged.
- September 8 – Cardinal Giovanni Vitelleschi captures Foligno, ending Trinci's signoria.
- September 20 – In the modern-day Indian state of Rajasthan, Raja Udharan becomes the new King of Amber upon the death of the Raja Banbir.
- September 24 - King Erik XIII of Sweden is declared deposed in Sweden while Karl Knutsson Bonde continues to serve as Regent of Sweden. Erik remains King of Norway.
- September 25 – King Henry VI of England summons the English Parliament, directing all members to assemble at Westminster on November 12.

=== October–December ===
- October 30 – The Council of Basel begins a conclave to elect its own successor to Pope Eugene IV, whom it had deposed on June 25.
- November 2 – A Great Ordinance is adopted by the French Estates-General. This measure grants the king the exclusive right to raise troops, and establishes the taxation measure known as the taille, in support of a standing army.
- November 5 – The Council of Basel elects its own pontiff of the Roman Catholic Church, and selects Amadeus VIII, Duke of Savoy (considered an antipope), who takes the regnal name Felix V.
- November 12 – In England:
  - Parliament is opened and the House of Commons elects William Tresham as its speaker.
  - Plymouth becomes the first town incorporated by Parliament.
- November 22 – Following up on the declaration of union of the Roman Catholic Church with the Greek Orthodox Church, Pope Eugene IV signs an agreement of union with the Armenian Apostolic Church.
- December 18 – Pope Eugene IV designates nine archbishops and six bishops to join the College of Cardinals and one cardinal and one priest, for 17 appointments in all.

=== Date unknown ===
- At the Portuguese Cortes, Peter, Duke of Coimbra is appointed Regent of the Kingdom.
- Beginning of the settlement of the Azores with the arrival of the first Portuguese settlers in Santa Maria.
- Earliest likely date for Johannes Gutenberg's development of printing with movable type at Mainz.

== Births ==
- March 3 – Ashikaga Yoshimi, brother of Shōgun Ashikaga Yoshimasa (d. 1491)
- April 3 – Ludwig II, Count of Württemberg-Urach, German noble (d. 1457)
- May 29 – Pope Pius III (d. 1503)
- July 18 – John V, Duke of Saxe-Lauenburg, German duke (d. 1507)
- July 26 – Sigismund, Duke of Bavaria, member of the Wittelsbach dynasty (d. 1501)
- August 10 – Anne of York, Duchess of Exeter, Duchess of York, second child of Richard Plantagenet (d. 1476)
- date unknown – Hua Sui, Chinese inventor and printer (d. 1513)

== Deaths ==
- April 30 – Richard Beauchamp, 13th Earl of Warwick, English military leader (b. 1382)
- June 24 – DFrederick IV, Duke of Austria (b. 1382)
- September 12 – Sidi El Houari, Algerian imam (b. 1350)
- October 20 – Ambrose the Camaldulian, Italian theologian
- October 27 – Albert II of Germany, Holy Roman Emperor (b. 1397)
- December 30 – Margaret Holland, English noblewoman (b. 1385)
