= Golovkovo =

Golovkovo (Russian: Головково) is the name of several rural localities in Russia.

== Leningrad Oblast ==
As of 2012, one rural locality in Leningrad Oblast bears this name:

- Golovkovo, Leningrad Oblast, a village in Anisimovskoye Settlement Municipal Formation of Boksitogorsky District; 59°13′N 34°15′E

== Moscow Oblast ==
As of 2012, three rural localities in Moscow Oblast bear this name:

- Golovkovo, Klinsky District, Moscow Oblast, a village under the administrative jurisdiction of the Town of Klin in Klinsky District
- Golovkovo, Naro-Fominsky District, Moscow Oblast, a village in Tashirovskoye Rural Settlement of Naro-Fominsky District
- Golovkovo, Solnechnogorsky District, Moscow Oblast, a village in Smirnovskoye Rural Settlement of Solnechnogorsky District

== Nizhny Novgorod Oblast ==
As of 2012, one rural locality in Nizhny Novgorod Oblast bears this name:

- Golovkovo, Nizhny Novgorod Oblast, a village under the administrative jurisdiction of the town of district significance of Lyskovo in Lyskovsky District

== Novgorod Oblast ==
As of 2012, one rural locality in Novgorod Oblast bears this name:

- Golovkovo, Novgorod Oblast, a village in Zhirkovskoye Settlement of Demyansky District

== Smolensk Oblast ==
As of 2012, one rural locality in Smolensk Oblast bears this name:

- Golovkovo, Smolensk Oblast, a village in Izvekovskoye Rural Settlement of Novoduginsky District

== Tver Oblast ==
As of 2012, six rural localities in Tver Oblast bear this name:

- Golovkovo, Bologovsky District, Tver Oblast, a village in Vypolzovskoye Rural Settlement of Bologovsky District
- Golovkovo, Kalyazinsky District, Tver Oblast, a village in Starobislovskoye Rural Settlement of Kalyazinsky District
- Golovkovo, Krasnokholmsky District, Tver Oblast, a village in Glebenskoye Rural Settlement of Krasnokholmsky District
- Golovkovo, Toropetsky District, Tver Oblast, a village in Pozhinskoye Rural Settlement of Toropetsky District
- Golovkovo, Vesyegonsky District, Tver Oblast, a village in Romanovskoye Rural Settlement of Vesyegonsky District
- Golovkovo, Zubtsovsky District, Tver Oblast, a village in Vazuzskoye Rural Settlement of Zubtsovsky District

== Vologda Oblast ==
As of 2012, one rural locality in Vologda Oblast bears this name:

- Golovkovo, Vologda Oblast, a village in Votchinsky Selsoviet of Vologodsky District

== Yaroslavl Oblast ==
As of 2012, two rural localities in Yaroslavl Oblast bear this name:

- Golovkovo, Bolsheselsky District, Yaroslavl Oblast, a khutor in Blagoveshchensky Rural Okrug of Bolsheselsky District
- Golovkovo, Uglichsky District, Yaroslavl Oblast, a village in Vasilevsky Rural Okrug of Uglichsky District
