= Nikolay Glazkov =

Russian poet (1919–1979)

- Born: Nikolay Ivanovich Glazkov; 30 January 1919; Lyskovo, Russian SFSR
- Died: 1 October 1979 (aged 60); Moscow, Russian SFSR, Soviet Union
- Education: Moscow State Pedagogical University; Maxim Gorky Literature Institute

Nikolay Ivanovich Glazkov (Russian: Николай Иванович Глазков, IPA: [nʲɪkɐˈlaj ɪˈvanəvʲɪdʑ ɡlɐˈskof]; 30 January 1919 – 1 October 1979) was a Soviet Russian poet who coined the term samizdat.

== Life ==
Glazkov was born in the village of Lyskovo, in what is now Nizhny Novgorod Oblast, Russia. His father was a lawyer and his mother was a teacher of German language. The family moved to Moscow in 1923. Glazkov began writing poetry at a very early age. As a student, he attended the literature faculty of Moscow State Pedagogical University. In 1938 his father was repressed during the Great Purge, and in 1940 Glazkov was thrown out of university as a relative of an enemy of the people. Soon afterwards, however, he was allowed to attend Maxim Gorky Literature Institute, from which he graduated in 1942. Upon graduation he worked as a village teacher, but in 1944 he returned to Moscow. He worked odd jobs such as loading trucks and sawing lumber, all the while publishing poetry both officially and unofficially. Parodying the ceremonious names of the official printing organs of the Soviet Union, he printed his poetry under the publishing house name of Samsebyaizdat (which literally translates as something like self-publishing house). This was later shortened to samizdat, a term now known to any student of Soviet literature.

Through the 1950s and 1960s, Glazkov continued to be published with and without the consent of the Soviet authorities. He made a cameo appearance as the peasant in the hot air balloon at the beginning of Tarkovsky's 1966 film Andrei Rublev. He died on 1 October 1979 in Moscow.

== Work and reputation ==
There are many facets to Glazkov's extremely prodigious poetic output. On one hand, he was known for neologisms and clever use of the Russian language to make seemingly impossible rhymes. In this, he was sometimes seen (as he himself asserted) as a follower of Velimir Khlebnikov. He was also noted for his lighthearted jokey verse, such as a retelling of Edgar Allan Poe's "The Raven" where the narrator, after being made quite gloomy by the raven's predictions of woe, decides to test him by asking whether he knows any cities in Chile. He is also somewhat of an alternative cult figure, both for his short, humorous-philosophical poetry and his relationship with the Soviet regime. Since much of his best poetry was indeed samizdat, his poems have been retold, rearranged and worked their way into the national consciousness.

He was also known to have issued poems that were deliberately badly written, ostentatiously rhyming Communism and socialism any chance he could get, or "censoring" his own poems. He would also translate poetry from nearly every language, often showing off with disrespect of the original work such as sticking in parts of other poems in the middle. Glazkov himself is a frequent personage in his poetry, where he is often (partially ironically) treated as an amazing genius.
