= Lyskovo =

Lyskovo (Russian: Лысково) is the name of several inhabited localities in Russia.

== Urban localities ==
- Lyskovo, Nizhny Novgorod Oblast, a town in Lyskovsky District of Nizhny Novgorod Oblast

== Rural localities ==
- Lyskovo, Chelyabinsk Oblast, a selo in Lyskovsky Selsoviet of Oktyabrsky District of Chelyabinsk Oblast
- Lyskovo, Ivanovo Oblast, a village in Zavolzhsky District of Ivanovo Oblast
- Lyskovo, Kaluga Oblast, a village in Iznoskovsky District of Kaluga Oblast
- Lyskovo, Antropovsky District, Kostroma Oblast, a village in Kotelnikovskoye Settlement of Antropovsky District of Kostroma Oblast
- Lyskovo, Galichsky District, Kostroma Oblast, a village in Stepanovskoye Settlement of Galichsky District of Kostroma Oblast
- Lyskovo, Mozhaysky District, Moscow Oblast, a village in Sputnik Rural Settlement of Mozhaysky District of Moscow Oblast
- Lyskovo, Mytishchinsky District, Moscow Oblast, a village in Fedoskinskoye Rural Settlement of Mytishchinsky District of Moscow Oblast
- Lyskovo, Ruzsky District, Moscow Oblast, a village in Volkovskoye Rural Settlement of Ruzsky District of Moscow Oblast
- Lyskovo, Smolensk Oblast, a village in Merlinskoye Rural Settlement of Krasninsky District of Smolensk Oblast
- Lyskovo, Tver Oblast, a village in Krasnokholmsky District of Tver Oblast
- Lyskovo, Mezhdurechensky District, Vologda Oblast, a village in Nozemsky Selsoviet of Mezhdurechensky District of Vologda Oblast
- Lyskovo, Sheksninsky District, Vologda Oblast, a village in Churovsky Selsoviet of Sheksninsky District of Vologda Oblast
- Lyskovo, Poshekhonsky District, Yaroslavl Oblast, a village in Fedorkovsky Rural Okrug of Poshekhonsky District of Yaroslavl Oblast
- Lyskovo, Rybinsky District, Yaroslavl Oblast, a village in Volzhsky Rural Okrug of Rybinsky District of Yaroslavl Oblast
