= Kerzhakov =

Kerzhakov (Russian: Кержаков) is a Russian surname, coming from name of river Kerzhenets and religious Old Believers group Kerzhaks. Notable people with the surname include:

- Aleksandr Kerzhakov (born 1982), Russian footballer
- Mikhail Kerzhakov (born 1987), Russian footballer
