= Makaryevsky Uyezd (Nizhny Novgorod Governorate) =

Uyezd of the Nizhny Novgorod Governorate, Russian Empire

Makaryevsky Uyezd (Макарьевский уезд) was one of the subdivisions of the Nizhny Novgorod Governorate of the Russian Empire. It was situated in the northeastern part of the governorate. Its administrative centre was Makaryevo.

== Demographics ==
At the time of the Russian Empire Census of 1897, Makaryevsky Uyezd had a population of 108,994. Of these, 98.5% spoke Russian, 1.2% Mari and 0.1% Tatar as their native language.
