= Makaryevo =

Makaryevo (Russian: Макарьево) is the name of several rural localities in Russia:

- Makaryevo, Nizhny Novgorod Oblast, a settlement in Valkovsky Selsoviet of Lyskovsky District of Nizhny Novgorod Oblast
- Makaryevo, Tver Oblast, a village in Nelidovsky District of Tver Oblast
