= Lyskovo, Nizhny Novgorod Oblast =

Town in Nizhny Novgorod Oblast, Russia

Lyskovo Лысково
- Town
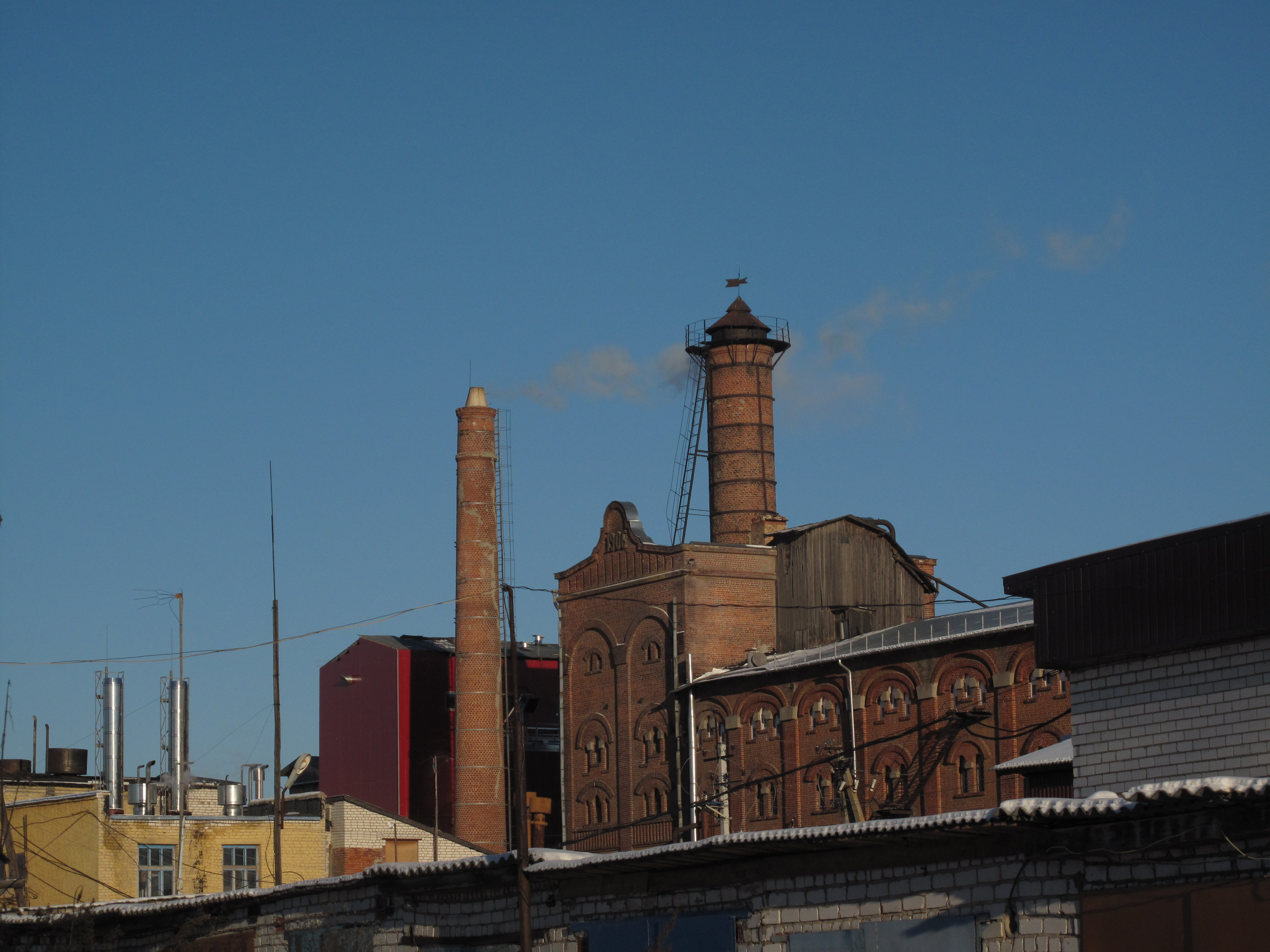
- Lyskovo Beer factory

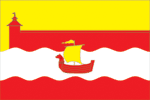
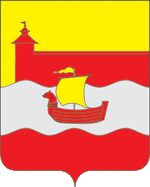
- Flag Coat of arms
- Interactive map of Lyskovo
- Location of Lyskovo Lyskovo (Nizhny Novgorod Oblast)
- Coordinates: 56°01′44″N 45°02′10″E
- Country: Russia
- Federal subject: Nizhny Novgorod Oblast
- Administrative district: Lyskovsky District
- Town of district significanceSelsoviet: Lyskovo
- First mentioned: 1410
- Town status since: 1925
- Elevation: 100 m (330 ft)

Population (2010 Census)
  - Total: 21,880
  - Estimate (2021): 21,657 (−1%)

Administrative status
  - Capital of: Lyskovsky District, town of district significance of Lyskovo

Municipal status
  - Municipal district: Lyskovsky Municipal District
  - Urban settlement: Lyskovo Urban Settlement
  - Capital of: Lyskovsky Municipal District, Lyskovo Urban Settlement
- Time zone: UTC+3 (MSK)
- Postal code: 606210–606213
- OKTMO ID: 22640101001

Lyskovo (Russian: Лы́сково) is a town and the administrative center of Lyskovsky District in Nizhny Novgorod Oblast, Russia, located on the southern side of the Volga River (since the 1980s, forming the Cheboksary Reservoir), opposite the mouth of the Kerzhenets River, 90 kilometers (56 mi) southeast of Nizhny Novgorod, the administrative center of the oblast. Population: 21,880 (2010 census); 23,901 (2002 census); 25,029 (1989 Soviet census).

== History ==
It was first mentioned in 1410. In 1686, Lyskovo was granted by the Russian government to the émigré Georgian monarch Archil II. Upon the extinction of his family, the village passed to Princes Gruzinsky, a related line of Georgian royalty who arrived to Russia in 1724. That family owned the village until the death of Prince Georgy Gruzinsky in 1852. From 1749 to 1808, the Lyskovo estate housed St. Nino's Cross, the principal relic of Georgian Christianity.

Town status was granted to Lyskovo in 1925.

== Administrative and municipal status ==
Within the framework of administrative divisions, Lyskovo serves as the administrative center of Lyskovsky District. As an administrative division, it is, together with the village of Golovkovo, incorporated within Lyskovsky District as the town of district significance of Lyskovo. As a municipal division, the town of district significance of Lyskovo is incorporated within Lyskovsky Municipal District as Lyskovo Urban Settlement.

== Transportation ==
The town is served by M7 Highway (Nizhny Novgorod–Kazan). There are no railways in Lyskovo or anywhere in the district. Ferry service connects the town with Makaryevo and its monastery.
