= Apostles' Fast =

Eastern and Oriental Orthodox Christian fast after Pentecost

The Apostles' Fast, also called the Fast of the Holy Apostles, the Fast of Peter and Paul, or sometimes St. Peter's Fast, is a fast observed by Eastern Orthodox, Oriental Orthodox, Eastern Catholic, and Eastern Protestant Christians. In the Byzantine tradition, the Fast begins on the second Monday after Pentecost (the day after All Saints' Sunday), whereas in the Coptic and old Syriac traditions, the Fast begins on the first Monday after Pentecost.

It continues until the Feast of Saints Peter and Paul on June 29. Traditionally, its duration varies from eight to forty-two days because of the moveable nature of Pascha. However, in Eastern Orthodox churches that follow the Revised Julian calendar, the fast can be as long as 29 days, or may not occur at all in some years.

== History ==
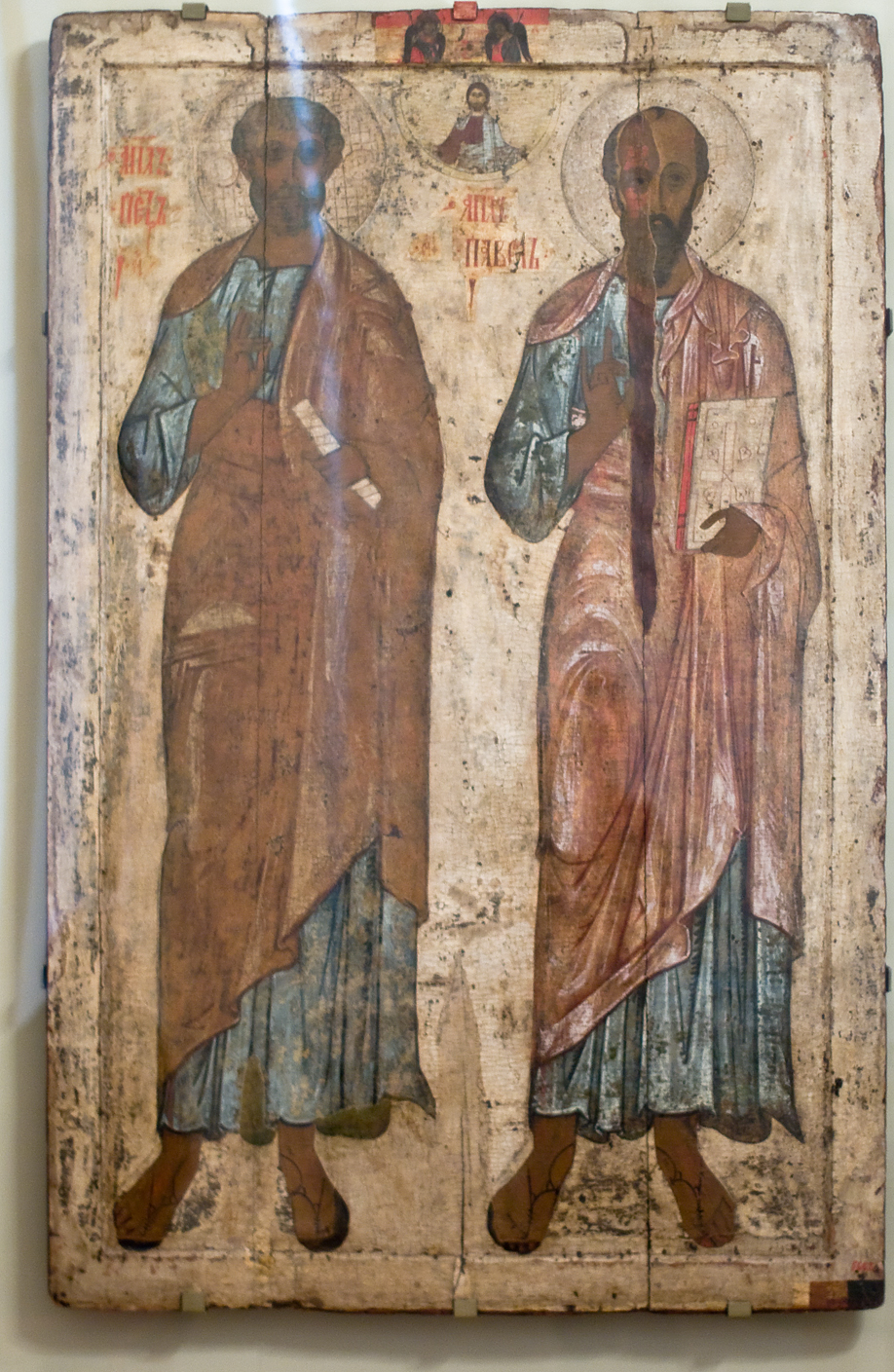
13th century icon of Ss. Peter and Paul (Belozersk).

Having rejoiced for fifty days following Pascha (Easter), the Resurrection of Jesus Christ, the Apostles began to prepare for their departure from Jerusalem to spread Christ's message. According to Sacred Tradition, as part of their preparation, they began a fast with prayer to ask God to strengthen their resolve and to be with them in their missionary undertakings.

The scriptural foundation for the Fast is found in the Synoptic Gospels, when the Pharisees criticized the apostles for not fasting, Jesus said to them, "Can the children of the bridechamber mourn, as long as the bridegroom is with them? But the days will come, when the bridegroom shall be taken from them, and then shall they fast." In the immediate sense, Christ was referring to his being taken to be crucified; but in the wider sense it is understood in terms of his Ascension into heaven and his commission to preach the Gospel, which can only be accomplished with prayer and fasting.

The Fast is thought to have been instituted out of thanksgiving to God for the witness of the apostles of Christ. With this Fast, believers express their thanks for the apostles' endurance of persecution during their mission.

== Practice ==
The Apostles Fast is not as strict as Great Lent or the Dormition Fast, but entails fasting from red meat, poultry, meat products, eggs, dairy products, fish, oil, and wine. For many Orthodox, fish, wine, and oil are allowed on all days except Wednesdays and Fridays. Some other Orthodox, such as the Antiochians, have slightly more strict rules, with fish only allowed on certain weekends. These fasting rules are much the same as those observed during the Nativity Fast.

As with the three other fasting seasons of the church year, there is a Great Feast that may fall during the Apostles Fast; in this case, the Feast of the Nativity of St. John the Baptist (June 24).

In some places, the Services on weekdays during the Apostles Fast are similar to the Services during Great Lent (with some variations). Many churches and monasteries in the Russian tradition will perform the Lenten Services on at least the first day of the Apostles Fast.

== Duration of the Fast ==
The length of the Fast is variable, being determined by the date of Pascha (Easter). 8 weeks after Pascha comes the Sunday of All Saints. The next day, Monday, the Fast of the Holy Apostles begins. The Fast lasts until June 29, the Feast of the Holy Apostles Peter and Paul. Depending on the date of Pascha, the Apostles Fast can begin as early as May 18 or as late as June 21. It may be as short as eight days or as long as 42 days in duration.

The Apostles Fast may not be observed at all in certain years for those Orthodox using the new calendar as the second Monday after Pentecost may fall on or after June 29, but it is always observed by the Orthodox using the traditional calendar. For those who follow the traditional Julian calendar, June 29 falls on the Gregorian calendar date of July 12.

== The Fast in Oriental traditions ==
The Coptic Orthodox Church fasts from the first Monday after Pentecost until 4th Epip according to the Coptic calendar, after which follows the Apostles' Feast day which is equivalent to 29th June on the Julian calendar.

The Syriac Orthodox Church also fasted from the first Monday after Pentecost until June 29, but the Council of Homs, held in 1946, shortened the fast by starting it on June 26.

In the Maronite Church, the duration of the fast has also been shortened as centuries passed by. Since the Maronite Church is an Oriental Church belonging to the Syriac tradition, we may suppose that in ancient times the fast used to start on first Monday after Pentecost. In the 16th century, Maronites fasted approximately 30 days, even less in some regions.

In 1598, the Synod of Dai'at Mussa shortened the fast to 14 days, making it start on June 15 (canon 30). This decision was renewed at the Synod of Hrash, in 1644 (chapter 9, canon 5). Finally, the Lebanese Council of 1736 shortened the fast to 4 days, starting it on June 25 (part 1, chapter 4, canon 2). Maronites used to abstain from all animal products, including fish and sea products, and from wine, but did not abstain from oil.

In the Melkite Greek Catholic Church, as well, the traditional start of the fast has been delayed. According to Byzantine Daily Worship, the fast begins on June 17. According to the liturgical calendars of the eparchies of New Zealand, Australia, as well as the United States, the fast begins on June 19.

== See also ==
- Great Lent
- Nativity Fast
- Dormition Fast
- Coptic Lenten Seasons
