= Pechersky Ascension Monastery =

Monastery in Nizhny Novgorod, Russia

- Печёрский Вознесенский монатырь
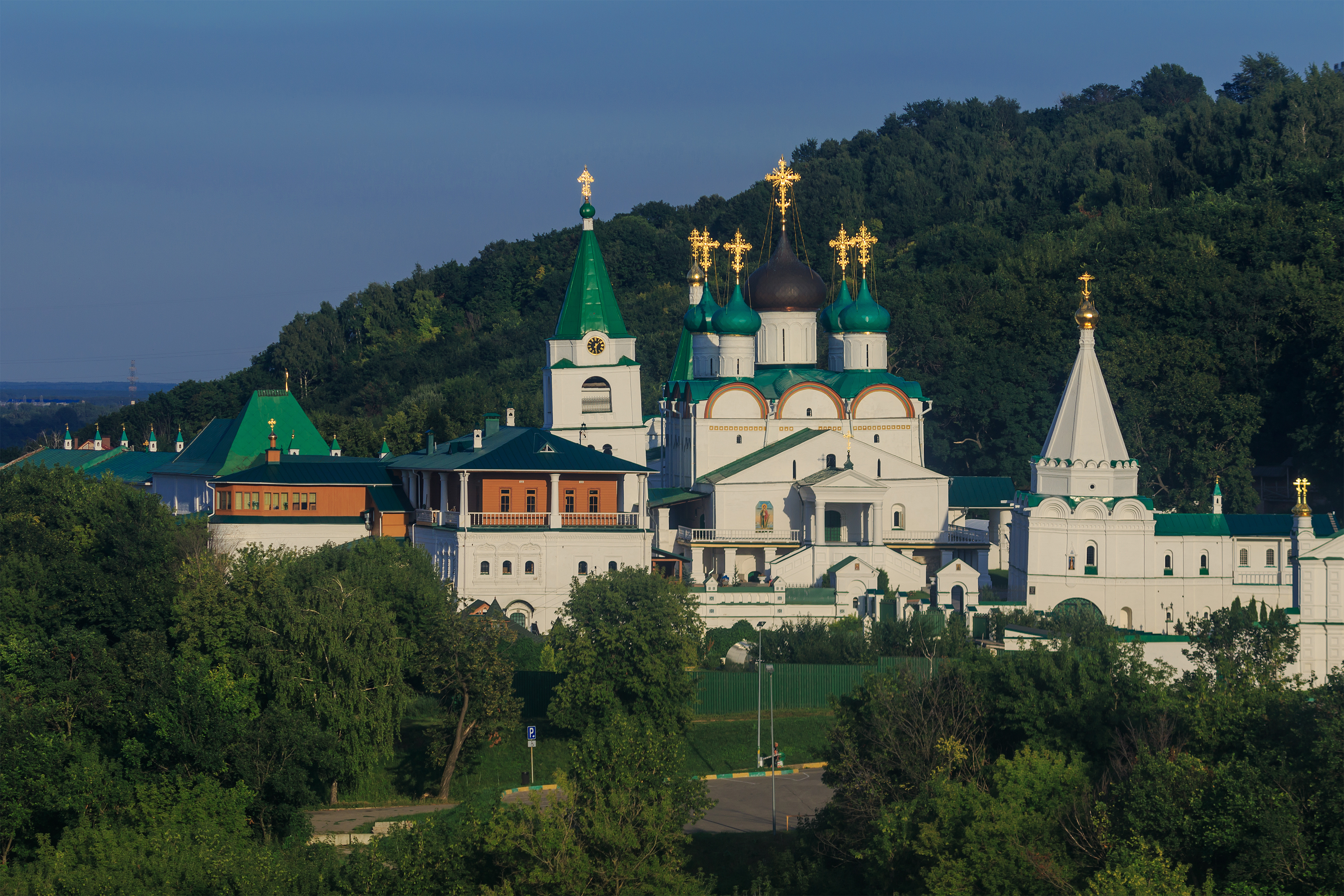

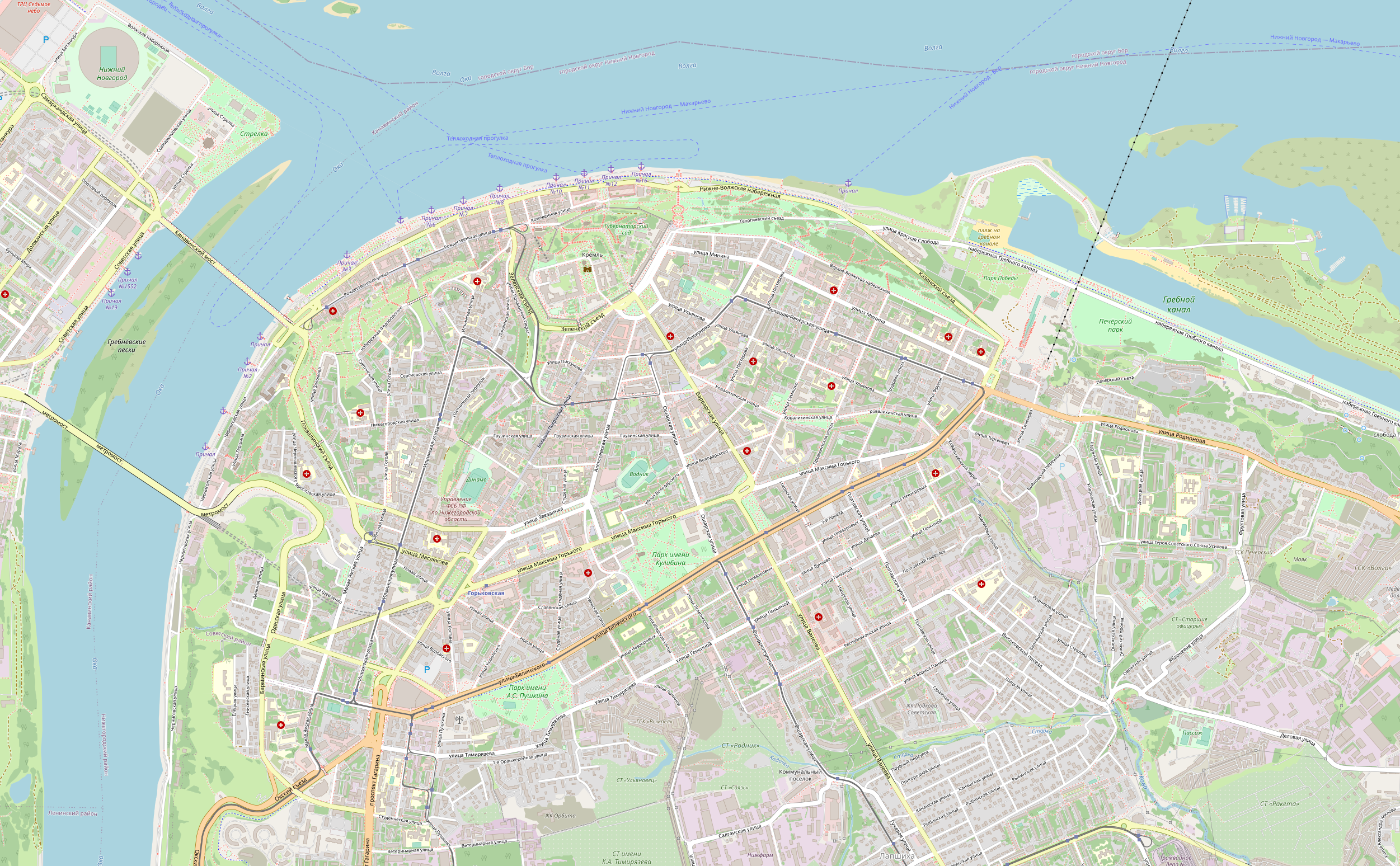
- Location within Nizhny Novgorod

Monastery information
- Full name: Pechersky Ascension male Monastery
- Order: Orthodox
- Established: 1328
- Diocese: Nizhny Novgorod and Arzamas

People
- Founder: Dionysius

Site
- Location: Nizhny Novgorod, Russia
- Coordinates: 56°19′22″N 44°02′59″E
- Visible remains: church, cloister, inner court and earthworks
- Public access: yes

Pechersky Ascension Monastery (Russian: Печёрский Вознесенский монастырь, Pechyorsky Vozensensky monastyr) is a monastery in Nizhny Novgorod, Russia. It is the principal monastery of the Nizhny Novgorod Eparchy (diocese) and the seat of the Bishop of Nizhny Novgorod and Arzamas.

== History ==
Pechersky Voznesensky Monastery is said to have been founded ca. 1328-1330 by St. Dionysius, who came to Nizhny Novgorod from Kiev Pechersk Lavra (i.e., Kiev Monastery of the Caves, pechery meaning 'caves') with other monks, and dug a cave on the step Volga shore some 3 km southeast of the city. Later on, he founded at that site a monastery with a church of Resurrection of the Lord.

The monastery was destroyed by a landslide on June 18, 1597. The same year the monastery was rebuilt about 1 km upstream (north) of the old site. Although there are no caves in the modern monastery, the appellation Pechersky, linking it to the old Kiev cloister, has been preserved. The monastery was closed by the NKVD in 1924, and reopened in 1994.

== Principal buildings ==
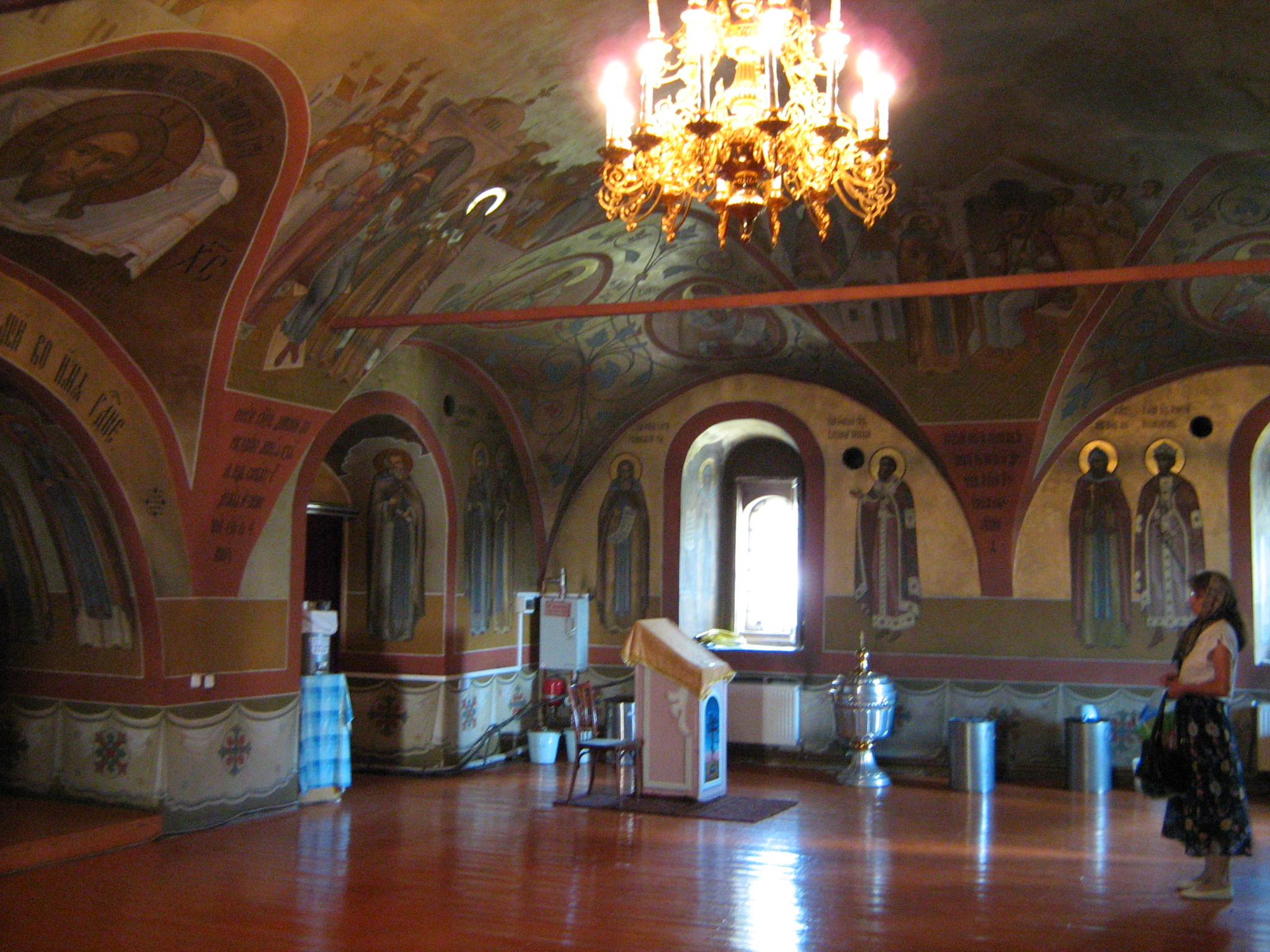
In the refectory section of the Ascension Cathedral

The principal buildings of the monastery include:

- Ascension Cathedral (Вознесенский собор)
- The Church of Dormition of Our Lady (Успенская церковь)
- The Church of Saint Venerable Euthimios of Suzdal (Надвратная церковь во имя св. преп. Евфимия Суздальского)
- The Church of SS Peter and Paul (Церковь во имя св. апостолов Петра и Павла)

The belfry of the Ascension Cathedral (which also serves as a clock tower) is noticeably out of plumb. It has been leaning almost since the time it was originally constructed.

== Holy relics ==
- In 2006-2007, the monastery housed a relic known as the Honorable Head (i.e., skull) of the Venerable Macarius. It was transferred to Makaryev Monastery in 2007.
