= Kerzhenets =

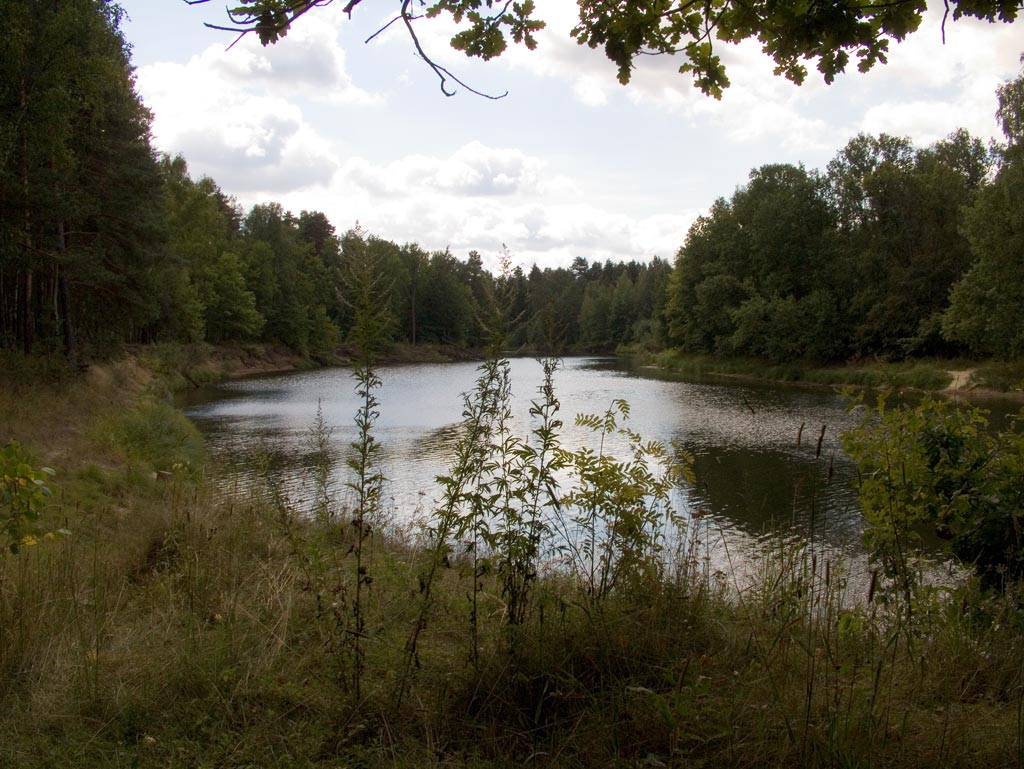
- The Kerzhenets near "Ozero" railway station

Location
- Country: Russia

Physical characteristics
- Mouth: Volga
  - coordinates: 56°05′25″N 44°57′51″E
- Length: 290 km (180 mi)
- Basin size: 6,140 km^{2} (2,370 sq mi)

Basin features
- Progression: Volga→ Caspian Sea

The Kerzhenets (Russian: Керженец) is a river in the Nizhny Novgorod Oblast in Russia. It is a left tributary of the Volga, joining it near Lyskovo, about 70 km east of Nizhny Novgorod. It is 290 kilometres (180 mi) long, and has a drainage basin of 6,140 square kilometres (2,370 sq mi).

== History ==
After the schism (Raskol) of the 1660s within the Russian Orthodox Church, the densely forested shores of the Kerzhenets became the refuge for many Old Believers. Their settlements, called Kerzhenets sketes (Russian: Керженские скиты), remained numerous into the 19th century, and the people themselves were known as the Kerzhaks (Кержаки).

According to an Old Believer legend, the oldest of the sketes, the Olenevsky Skete (Russian: Оленевский скит, i.e. "The Skete of the Deer"), had supposedly been founded in the 15th century by some of Venerable Macarius's monks to commemorate their leader's Miracle of the Moose that took place at that site, and later joined the Raskol.

The former skete is now the village of Bolshoye Olenevo, located some 24 km south-east from the district capital Semyonov.
