= Lyskovsky District =

Lyskovsky District Лысковский район (Russian)
- District
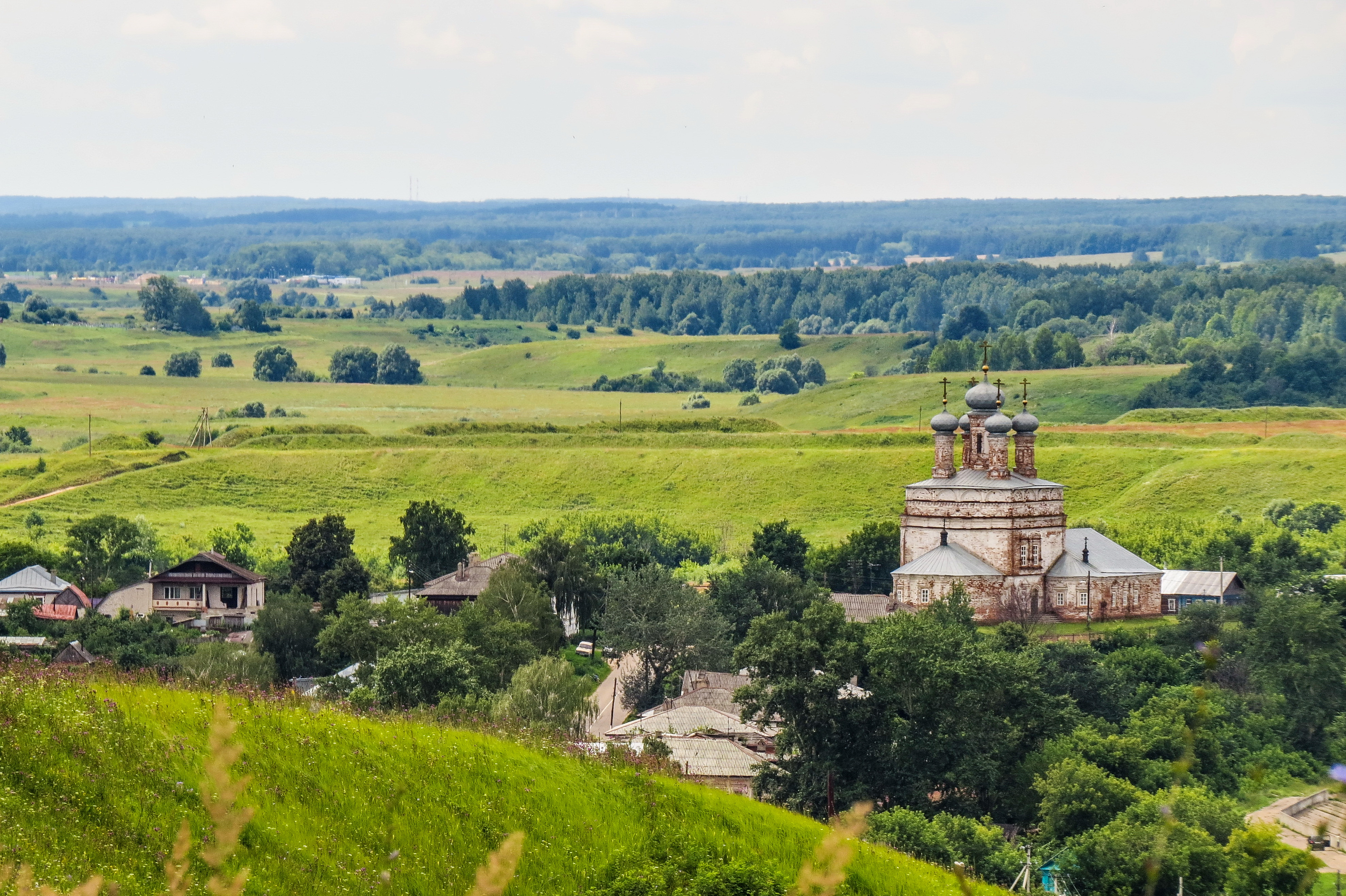
- Transfiguration Cathedral in Lyskovo

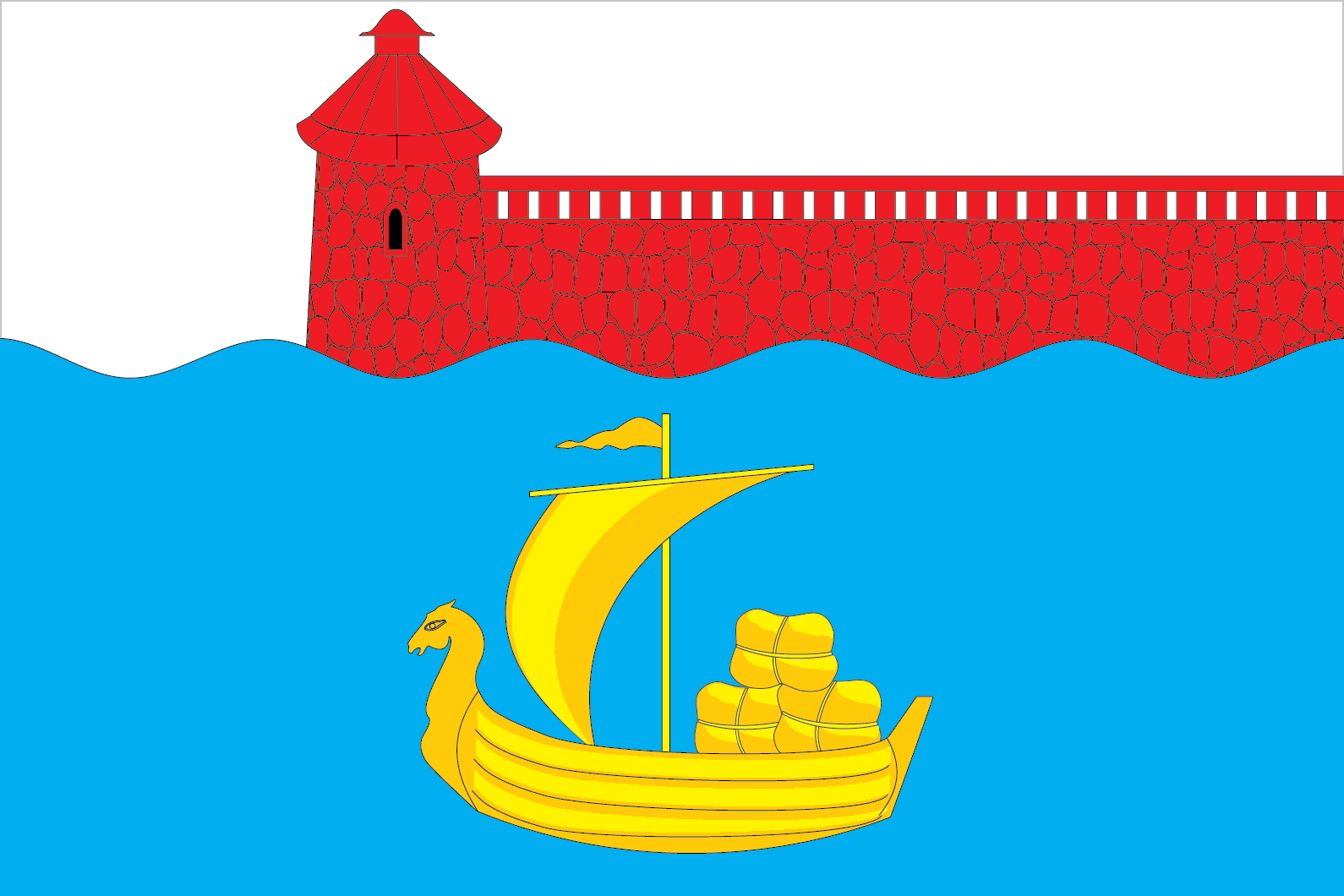
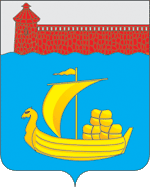
- Flag Coat of arms
- Location of Lyskovsky District in Nizhny Novgorod Oblast
- Coordinates: 56°00′46″N 45°01′31″E
- Country: Russia
- Federal subject: Nizhny Novgorod Oblast
- Established: 1929
- Administrative center: Lyskovo

Area
  - Total: 2,134 km^{2} (824 sq mi)

Population (2010 Census)
  - Total: 39,964
  - Density: 18.73/km^{2} (48.50/sq mi)
  - Urban: 54.7%
  - Rural: 45.3%

Administrative structure
  - Administrative divisions: 1 Towns of district significance, 8 Selsoviets
  - Inhabited localities: 1 cities/towns, 101 rural localities

Municipal structure
  - Municipally incorporated as: Lyskovsky Municipal District
  - Municipal divisions: 1 urban settlements, 8 rural settlements
- Time zone: UTC+3 (MSK)
- OKTMO ID: 22640000
- Website: http://lsk.omsu-nnov.ru

Lyskovsky District (Russian: Лы́сковский райо́н) is an administrative district (raion), one of the forty in Nizhny Novgorod Oblast, Russia. Municipally, it is incorporated as Lyskovsky Municipal District. It is located in the east of the oblast on both sides of the Volga River. The area of the district is 2,134 square kilometers (824 sq mi). Its administrative center is the town of Lyskovo. Population: 39,964 (2010 Census); 43,755 (2002 census); 46,895 (1989 Soviet census). The population of Lyskovo accounts for 54.7% of the district's total population.

== History ==
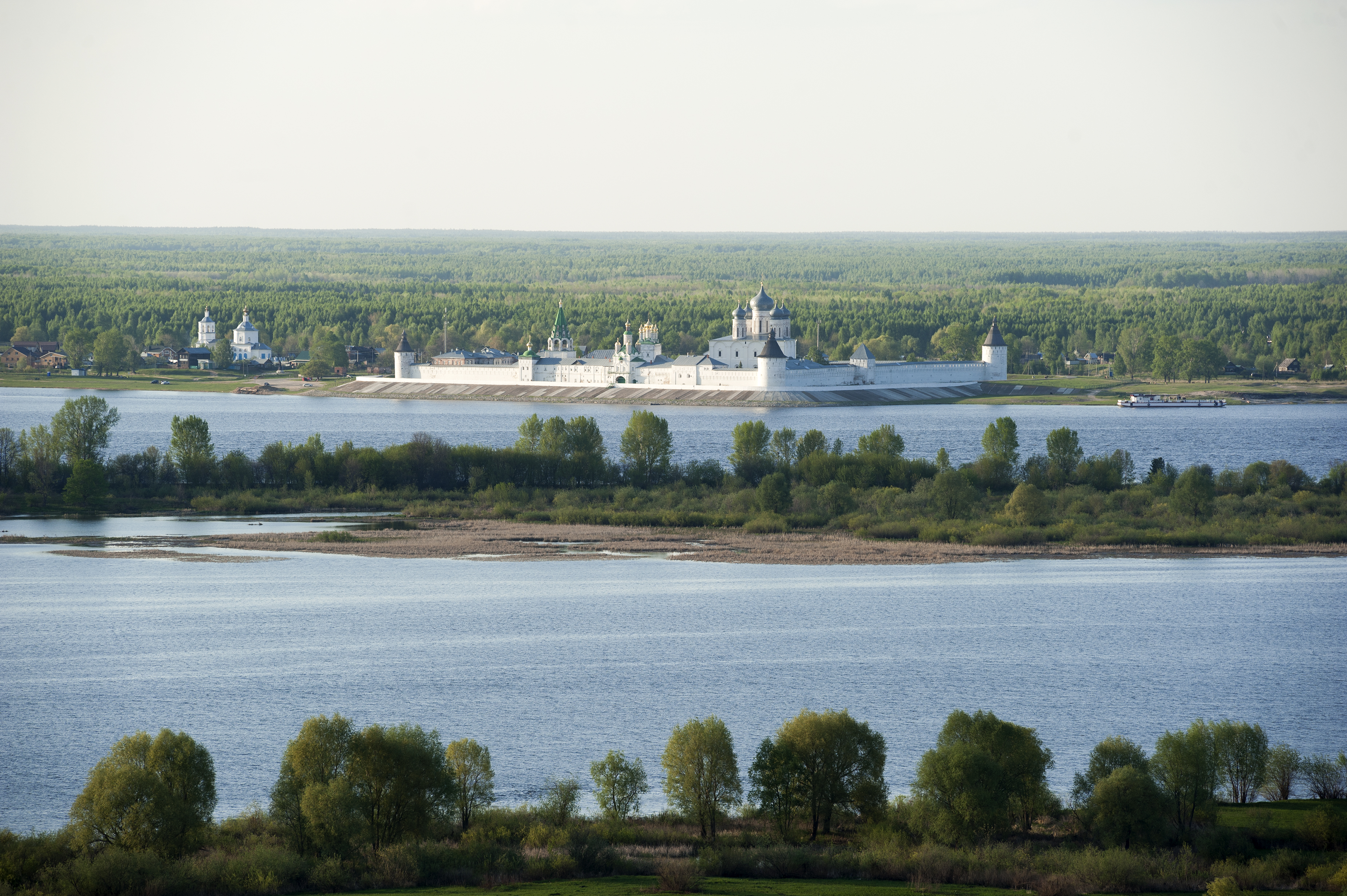
Makaryev Monastery

In the Russian Empire, the territory of what today is Lyskovsky District was mostly within Makaryevsky Uyezd of Nizhny Novgorod Governorate. The seat of the uyezd was in the town of Makaryev (today's settlement of Makaryevo) on the northern bank of the Volga River, next to the ancient Makaryev Monastery. Until the fire of 1816, Makaryev was home to the annual Makaryev Fair. The administrative offices of the uyezd, however, were located in the village of Lyskovo, which, being located on the southern bank of the Volga, was conveniently served by the Kazan Post Road.

The modern district was established in 1929.

== Economy ==
Lyskovo brewery and vegetable canning plant are well known in the region.
