= Makaryev Monastery =

Coordinates: 56°04′57″N 45°03′50″E

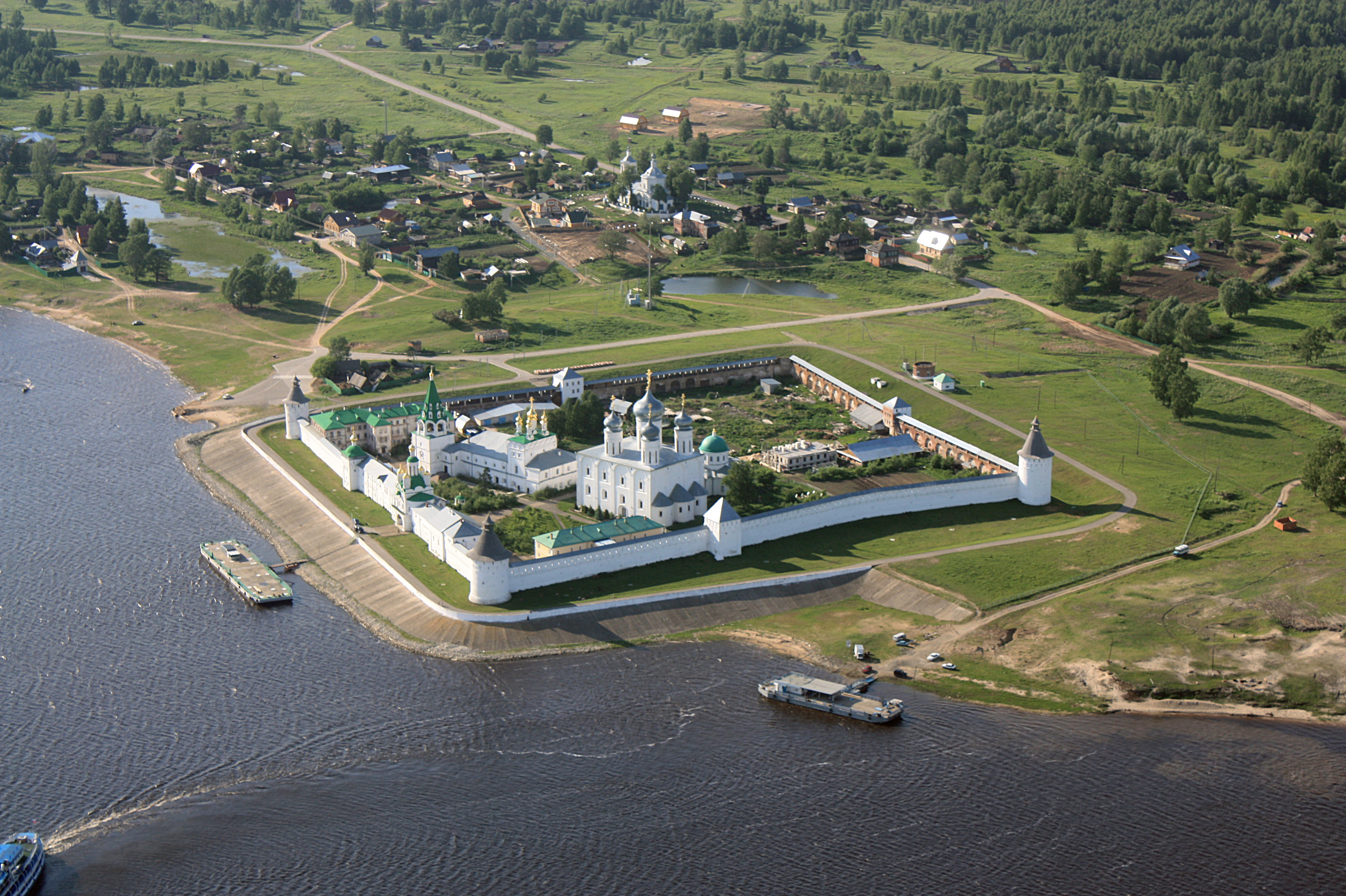
General view

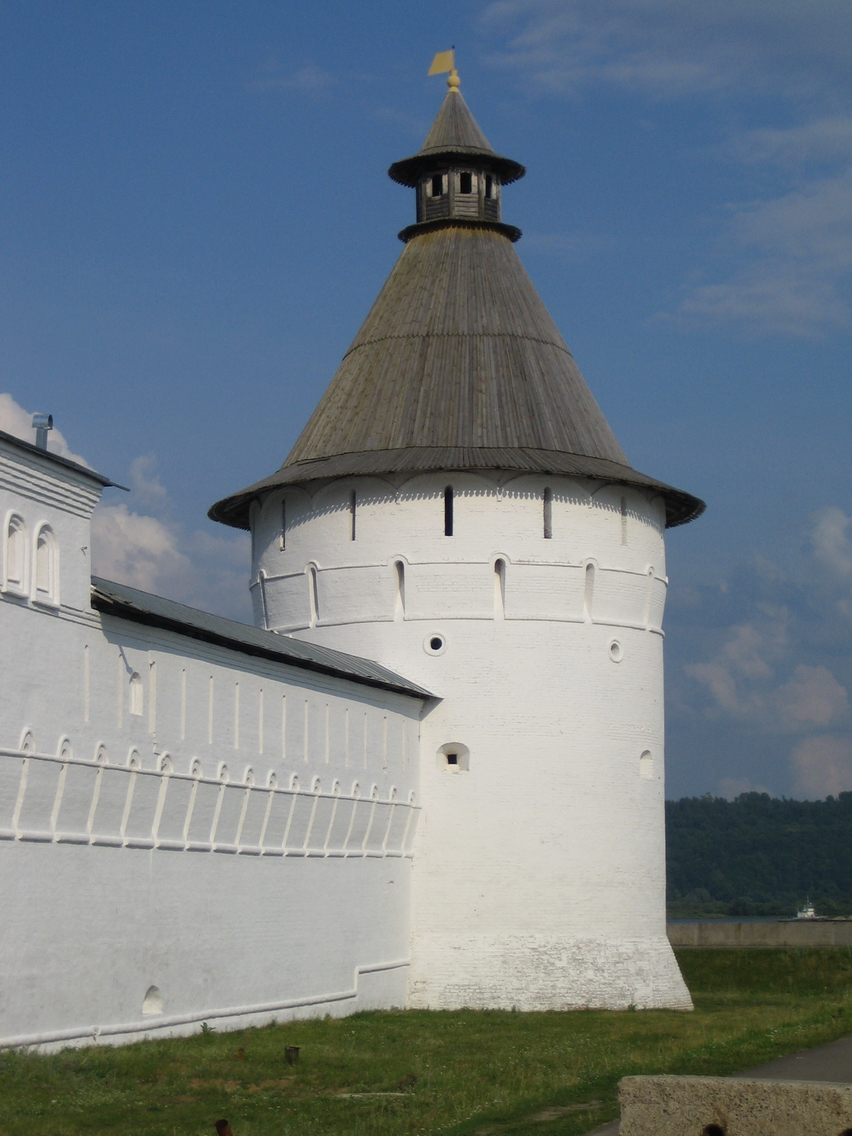
One of the towers of the Makaryev Monastery

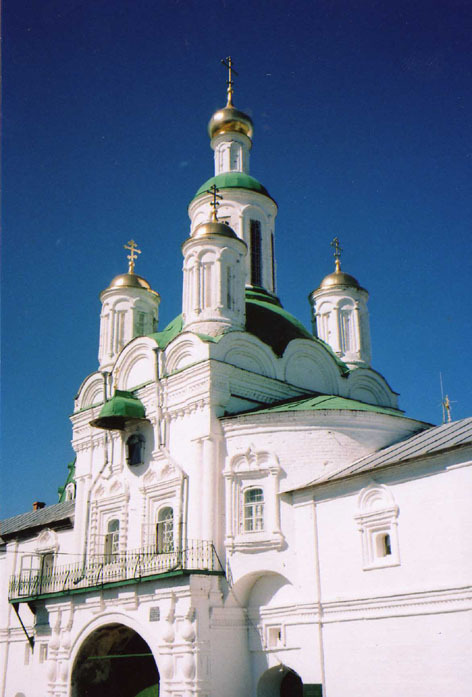

Zheltovodsky Makaryev Convent (formerly Monastery) of the Holy Trinity (Russian: Желтово́дский Тро́ицкий Мака́рьев монасты́рь or Свя́то-Тро́ице-Мака́рьево-Желтово́дский же́нский монасты́рь) is one of the convents of the Russian Orthodox Church. It is located in the vicinity of the urban-type settlement of Makaryevo in Lyskovsky District of Nizhny Novgorod Oblast.

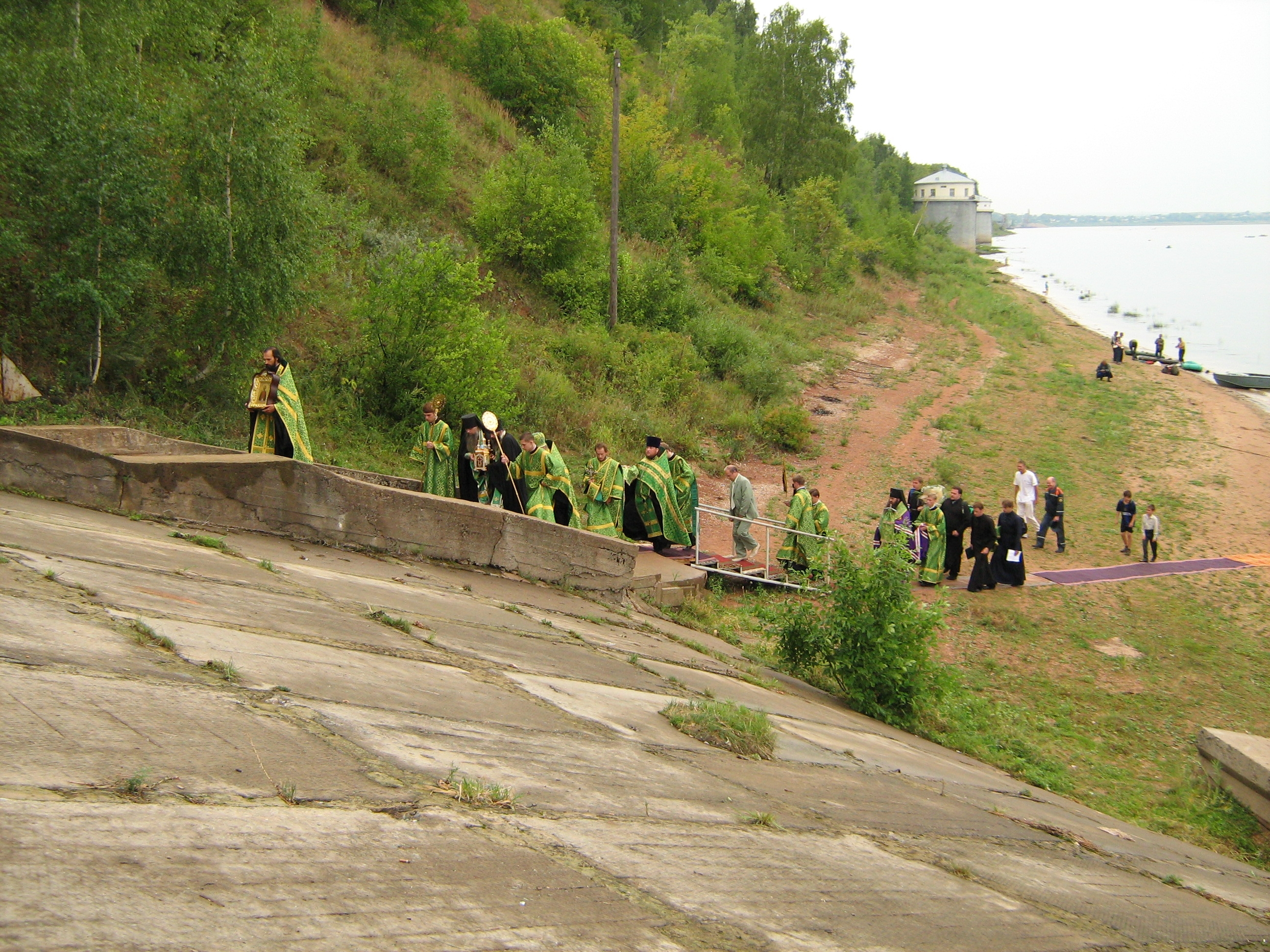
Macarius' head returned to Makaryevo

The outside of the monastery is in the 2010 film Salt.
