= Red in culture =

This article discusses the meaning of red in various cultures and traditions. Furthermore, various applications of this color in different countries are explained.

== In different cultures and traditions ==
In China, red (simplified Chinese: 红; traditional Chinese: 紅; pinyin: hóng) is the symbol of fire and the south (both south in general and Southern China specifically). It carries a largely positive connotation, being associated with courage, loyalty, honor, success, fortune, fertility, happiness, passion, and summer. In Chinese cultural traditions, red is associated with weddings (where brides traditionally wear red dresses) and red paper is frequently used to wrap gifts of money or other objects. Special red packets (simplified Chinese: 红包; traditional Chinese: 紅包; pinyin: hóng bāo in Mandarin or lai see in Cantonese) are specifically used during Chinese New Year celebrations for giving monetary gifts. On the more negative side, obituaries are traditionally written in red ink, and to write someone's name in red signals either cutting them out of one's life, or that they have died. Red is also associated with either the feminine or the masculine (yin and yang respectively), depending on the source. The Little Red Book, a collection of quotations from Chairman Mao Zedong, founding father of the People's Republic of China (PRC), was published in 1966 and widely distributed thereafter. Propaganda in China is usually depicted through red culture movement.

In Japan, red is a traditional color for a heroic figure. In the Indian subcontinent, red is the traditional color of bridal dresses, and is frequently represented in the media as a symbolic color for married women. The color is associated with purity, as well as with sexuality in marital relationships through its connection to heat and fertility. It is also the color of wealth, beauty, and the goddess Lakshmi.

In Central Africa, Ndembu warriors rub themselves with red paint during celebrations. Since their culture sees the color as a symbol of life and health, sick people are also painted with it. Like most Central African cultures, the Ndembu see red as ambivalent, better than black but not as good as white. In other parts of Africa, however, red is a color of mourning, representing death. Because red bears are associated with death in many parts of Africa, the Red Cross has changed its colors to green and white in parts of the continent.

The early Ottoman Turks led by the first Ottoman Sultan, Osman I, carried red banners symbolizing sovereignty, Ghazis and Sufism, until, according to legend, he saw a new red flag in his dream inlaid with a crescent.

In Russian culture the color red plays a significant role since days of Old Russia. It is so significant in the Russian folk culture and history that in ancient Russian language the words for beautiful and red (Russian: Красный, Krasny) were completely identical. But even in the modern Russian language, the terms for red and beautiful are strongly connected linguistically and are omnipresent in everyday usage. The color is perceived in Russia as the color of beauty, good and something honorable. Krasny (Russian: Красный) means red and krasivyy (Russian:красивый) means beautiful in modern Russian. The word for a beautiful girl or a beautiful woman in modern Russian language is krasávica (Russian: красавица), while a beautiful or good guy is called krasávčik (Russian: краса́вчик). To describe a lovely girl or a woman the word prekrasnaya (Russian: прекрасная) is used and prekrasnyy (Russian: прекрасный) is used for guys. Many places in Russia are also associated with the color red, like for example the Red Square or the city Krasnodar. Red is a predominant color on Russian folk costumes like the Sarafan and handicrafts like the Rushnyk and Khokhloma. Red roses appear on women's folk costumes, on men's hats during folk dances and on traditional Russian shawls. Red berries like the Viburnum opulus are an important component of Russian folk culture which occur in many Russian folk songs, while Kalinka is the most famous of them. Also, Easter eggs in Russia are often colored in red and the color plays a big role in the Russian Orthodox Church, like for example on the Russian icons. In Russia the word color, to paint or to dye means krásitʹ (Russian: кра́сить) which is also connected to red (Krasny, Krasna, Russian: Красный, кра́сна).

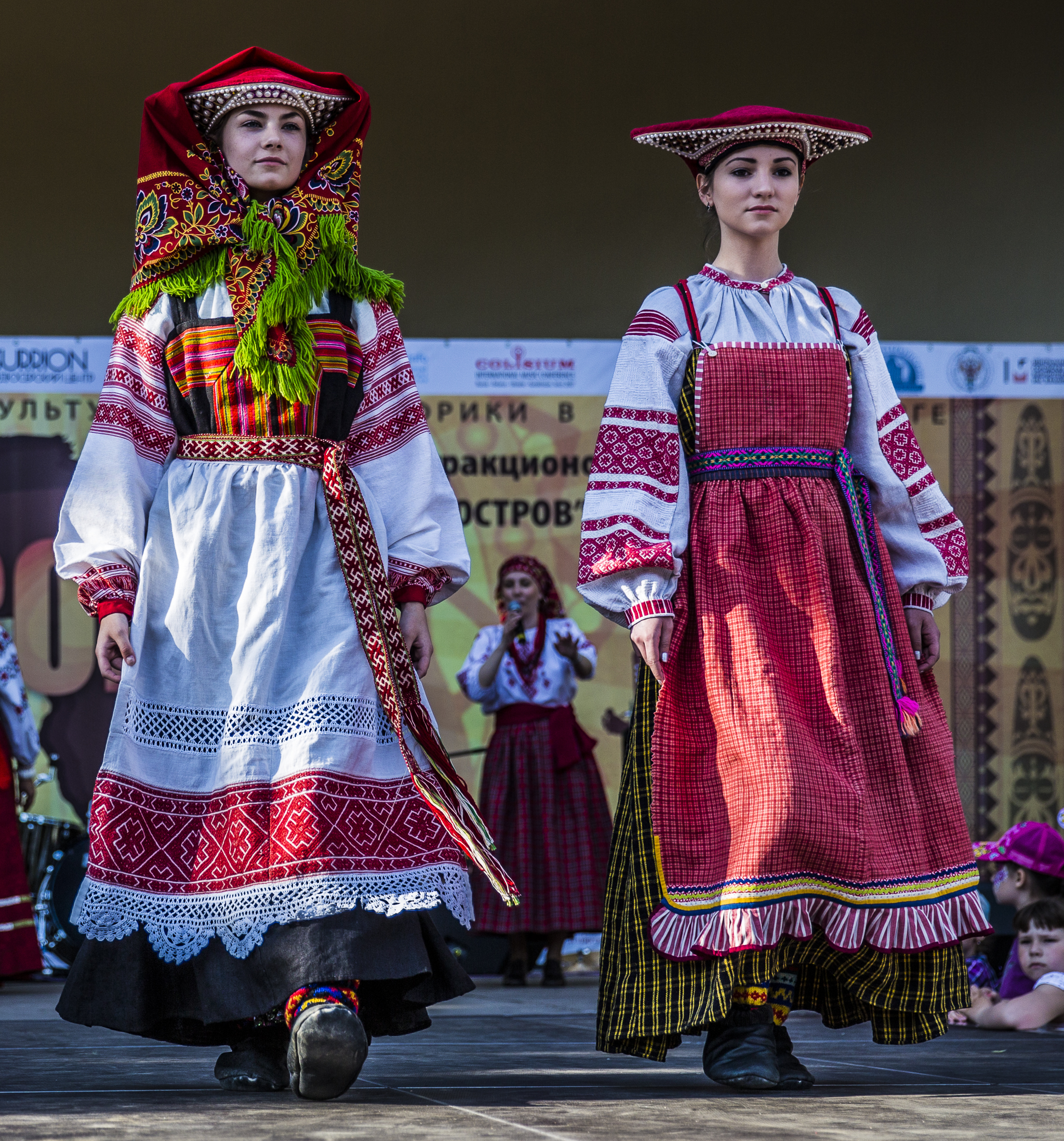
Red on Russian folk costumes

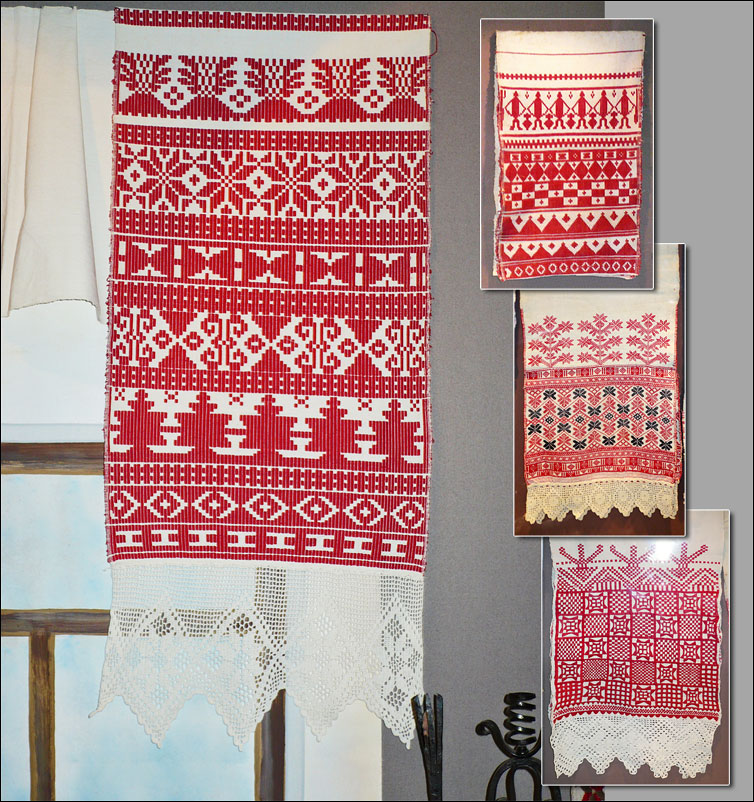
Red is predominant in the Russian ritual textile Rushnyk

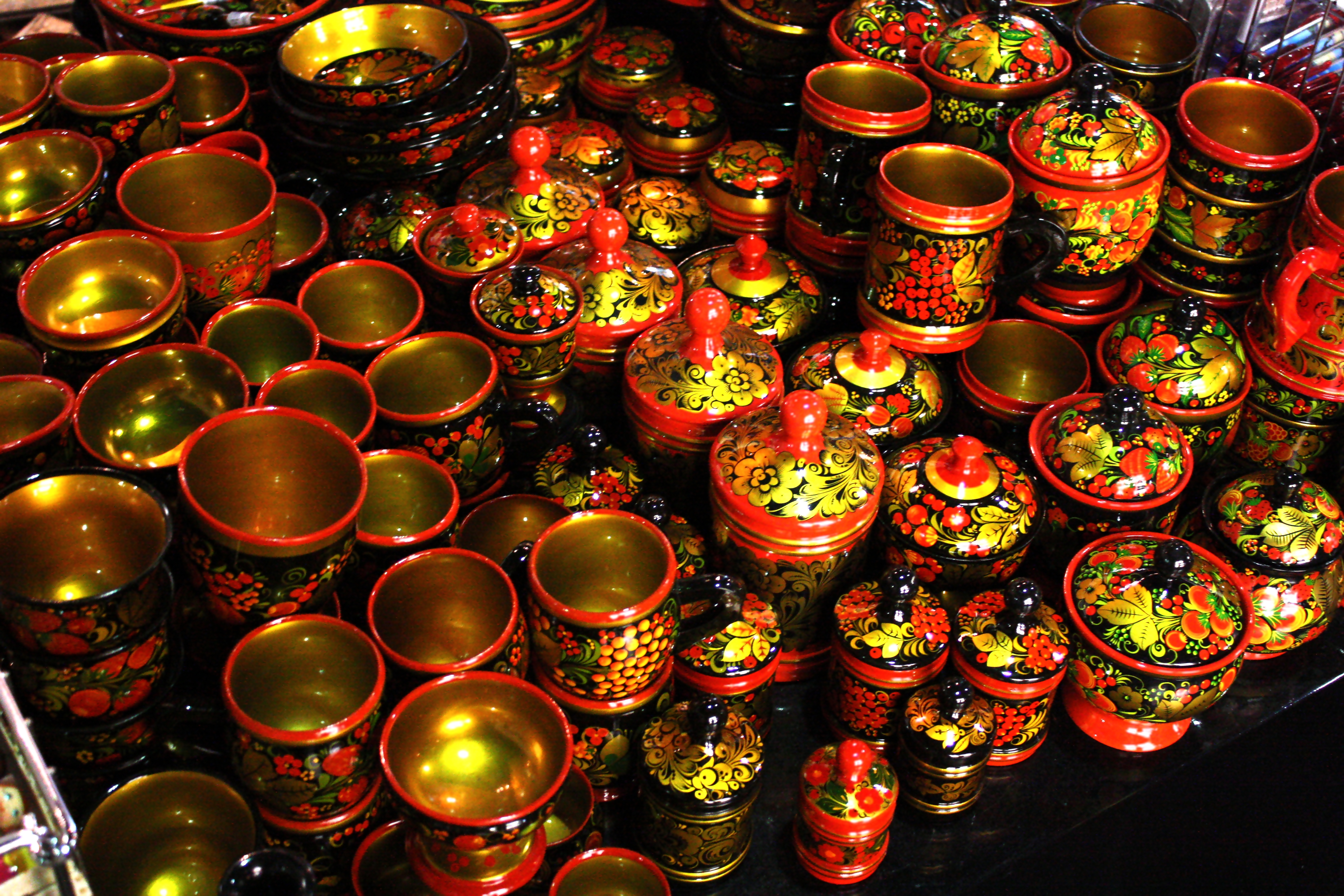
Red berries are an important part of Hohloma painting

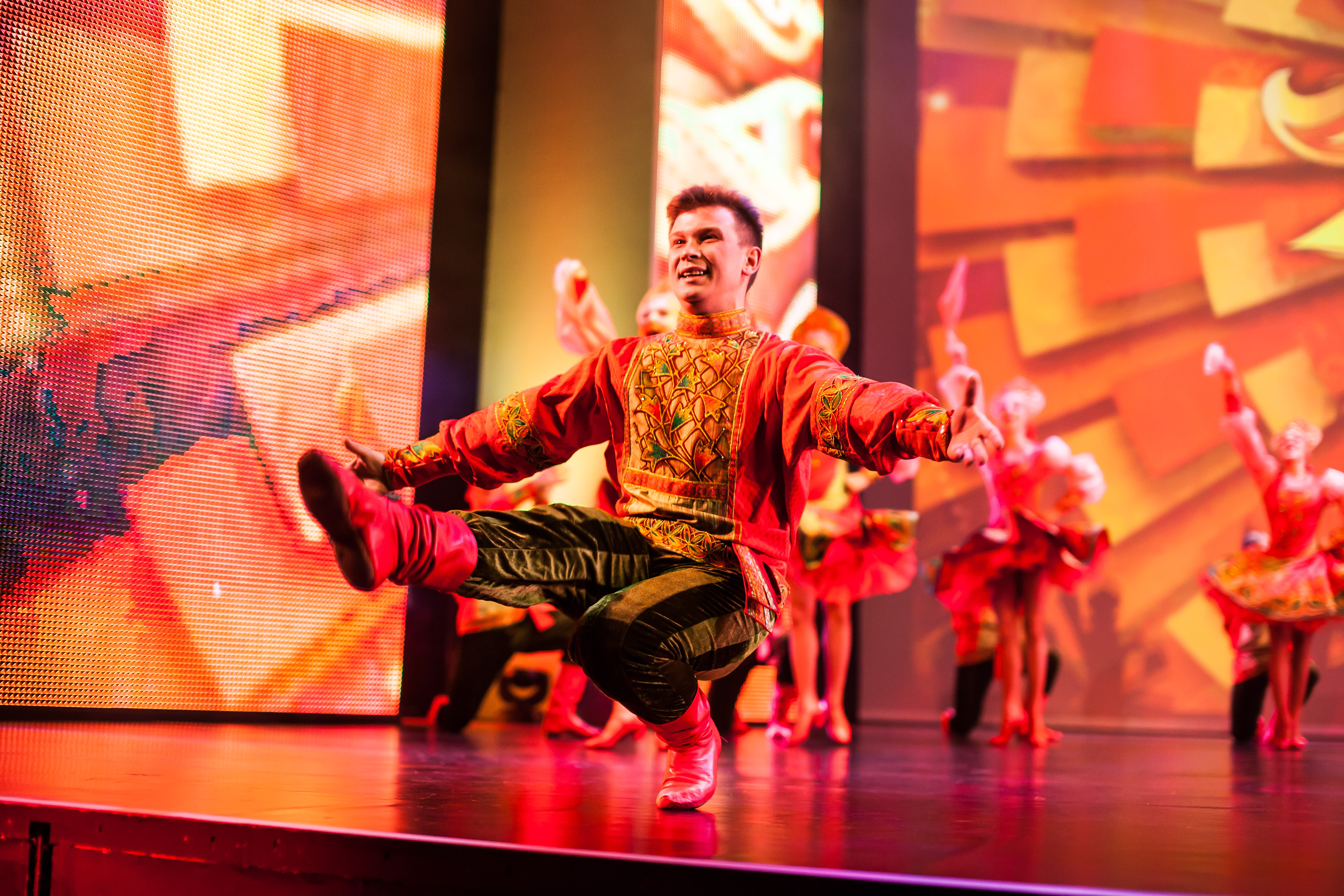
Russian red boots are worn by men during Russian dances

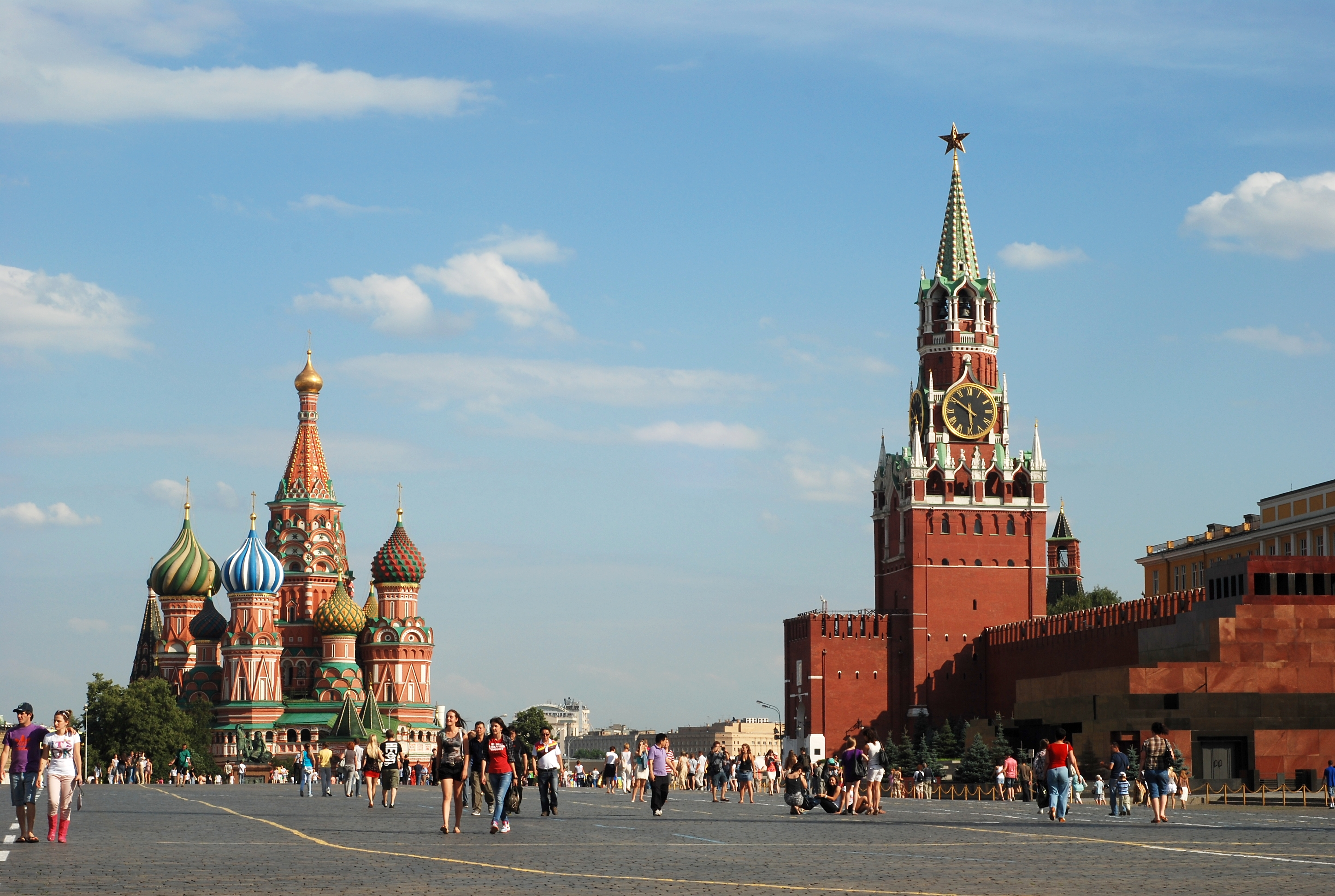
The original meaning of the Red Square was Beautiful Square.

=== Wedding dresses ===
In many Asian countries, red is the traditional color for a wedding dress today, symbolizing joy and good fortune.

- In India, brides traditionally wear a red sari, called the sari of blood, offered by their father, signifying that his duties as a father are transferred to the new husband, and as a symbol of his wish for her to have children. Once married, the bride will wear a sari with a red border, changing it to a white sari if her husband dies. In Pakistan and India, some brides traditionally also have their hands and feet painted red with henna by the family of their new spouse, to bring happiness and signify their new status.
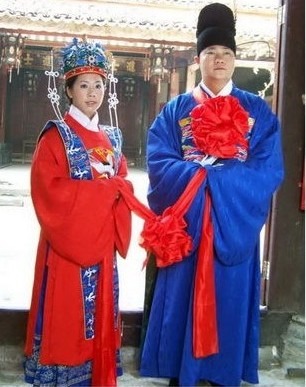
The bride at a traditional Chinese wedding dresses in red, the color of happiness and good fortune.

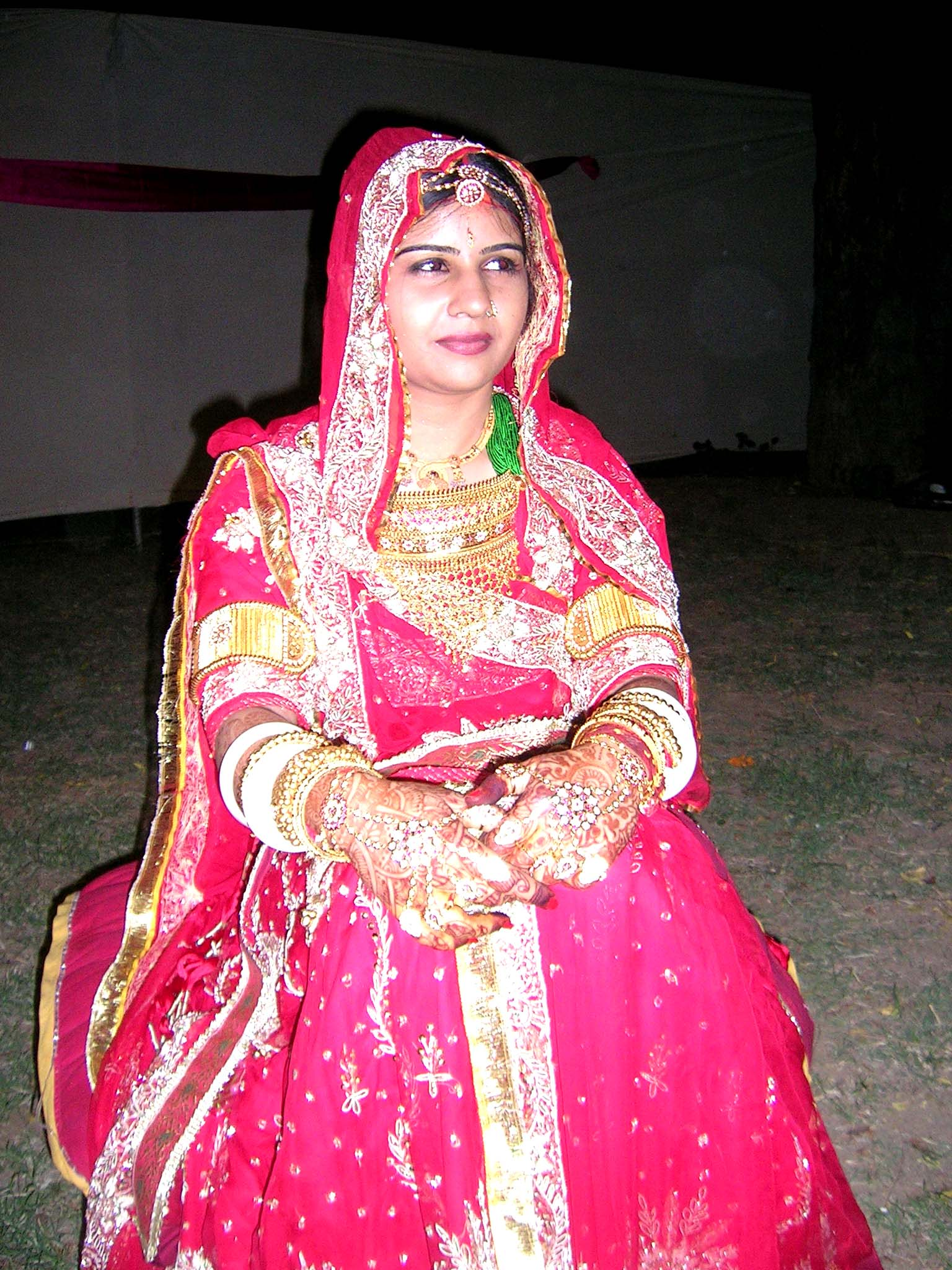
Wedding dress in Rajput, India.

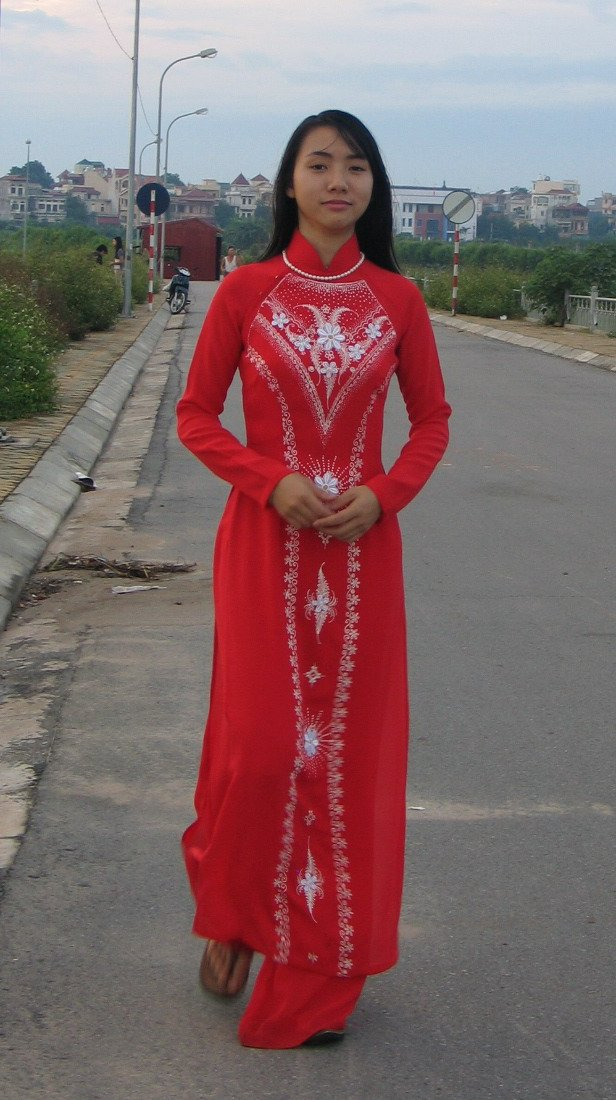
Wedding dress from Vietnam.

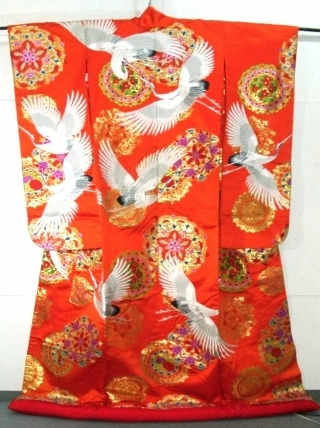
A red wedding kimono, or uchikake, from Japan. Brides in Japan can wear either a white kimono or bright colors.

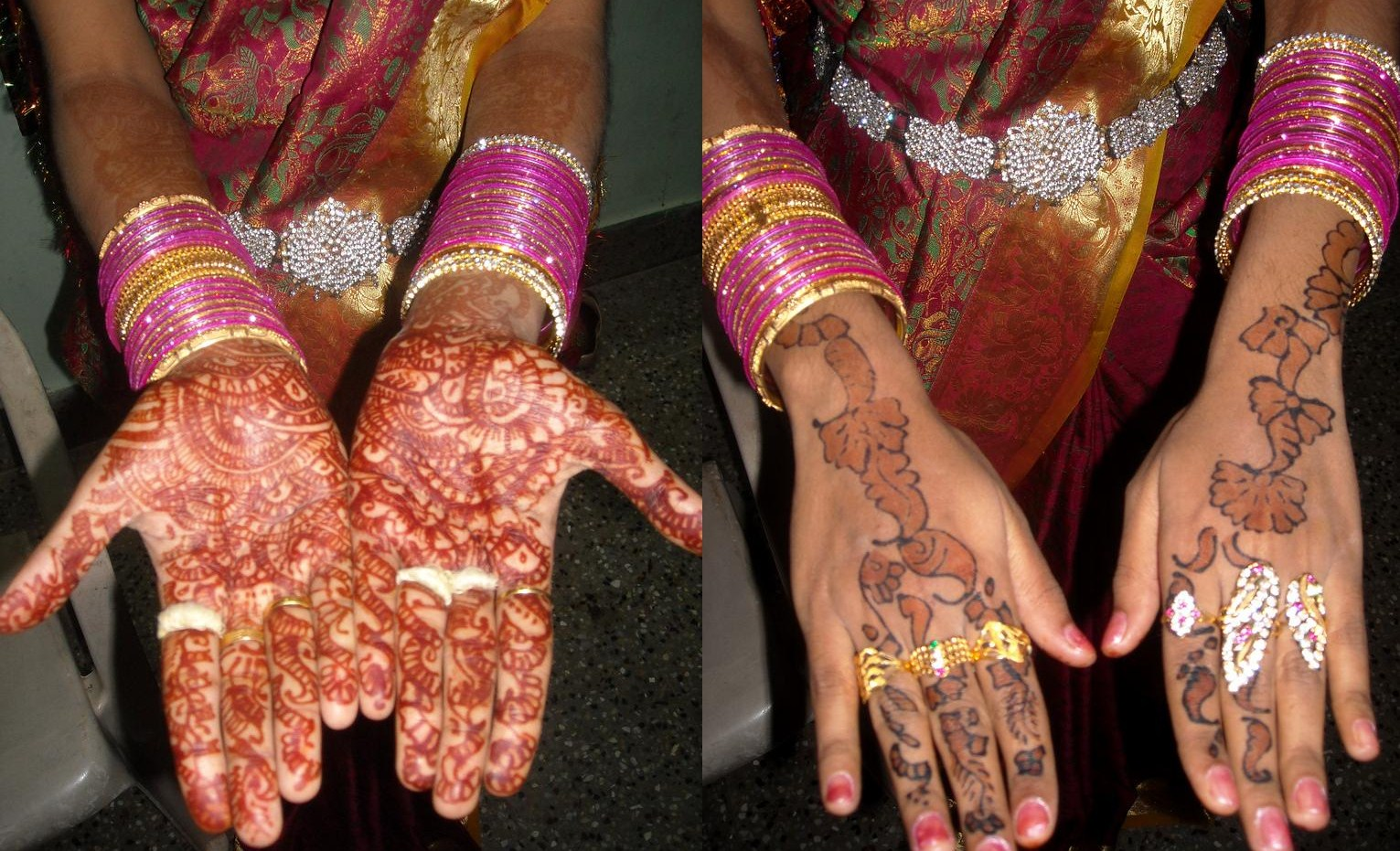
In India and Pakistan, brides traditionally have their hands and feet decorated with red henna.

== In religion ==
- In Christianity, red is associated with the blood of Christ and the sacrifice of martyrs. In the Roman Catholic Church it is also associated with pentecost and the Holy Spirit. Since 1295, it is the color worn by Cardinals, the senior clergy of the Roman Catholic Church. Red is the liturgical color for the feasts of martyrs, representing the blood of those who suffered death for their faith. It is sometimes used as the liturgical color for Holy Week, including Palm Sunday and Good Friday, although this is a modern (20th-century) development. In Catholic practice, it is also the liturgical color used to commemorate the Holy Spirit (for this reason it is worn at Pentecost and during Confirmation masses). Because of its association with martyrdom and the Spirit, it is also the color used to commemorate saints who were martyred, such as St. George and all the Apostles (except for the Apostle St. John, who was not martyred, where white is used). As such, it is used to commemorate bishops, who are the successors of the Apostles (for this reason, when funeral masses are held for bishops, cardinals, or popes, red is used instead of the white that would ordinarily be used).
- In Buddhism, red is one of the five colors which are said to have emanated from the Buddha when he attained enlightenment, or nirvana. It is particularly associated with the benefits of the practice of Buddhism; achievement, wisdom, virtue, fortune and dignity. It was also believed to have the power to resist evil. In China red was commonly used for the walls, pillars, and gates of temples.
- In the Shinto religion of Japan, the gateways of temples, called torii, are traditionally painted vermilion red and black. The torii symbolizes the passage from the profane world to a sacred place. The bridges in the gardens of Japanese temples are also painted red (and usually only temple bridges are red, not bridges in ordinary gardens), since they are also passages to sacred places. Red was also considered a color which could expel evil and disease.
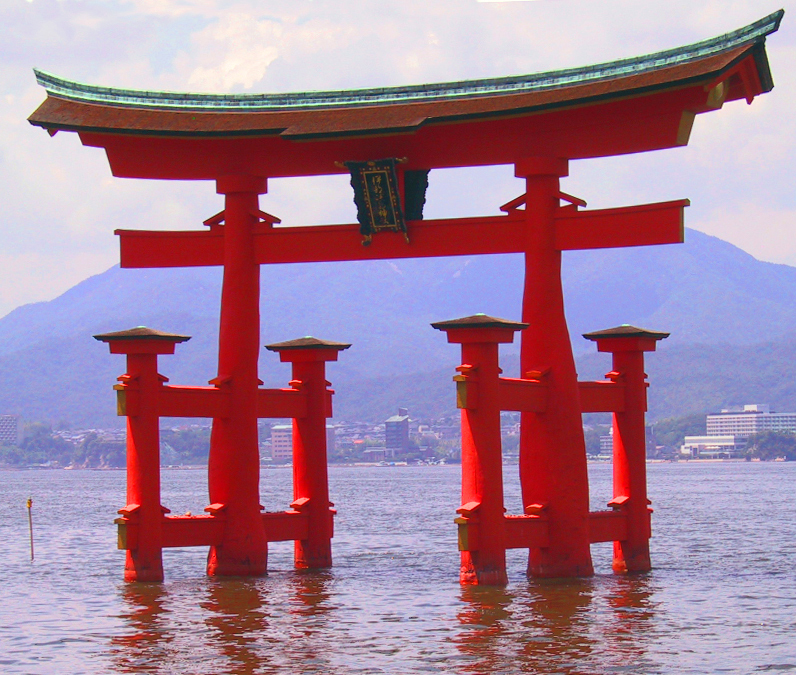
A Shinto torii at Itsukushima, Japan

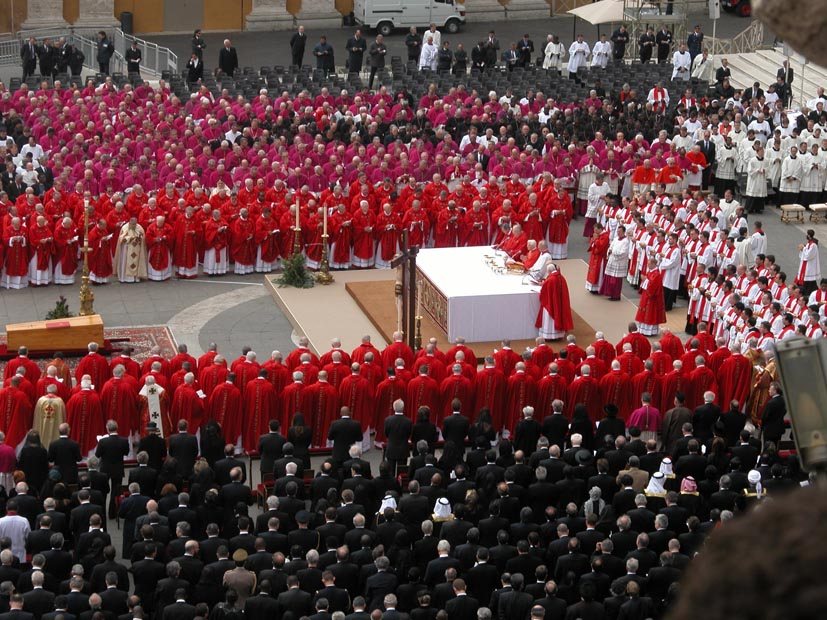
Cardinals of the Roman Catholic Church at the funeral of Pope John Paul II

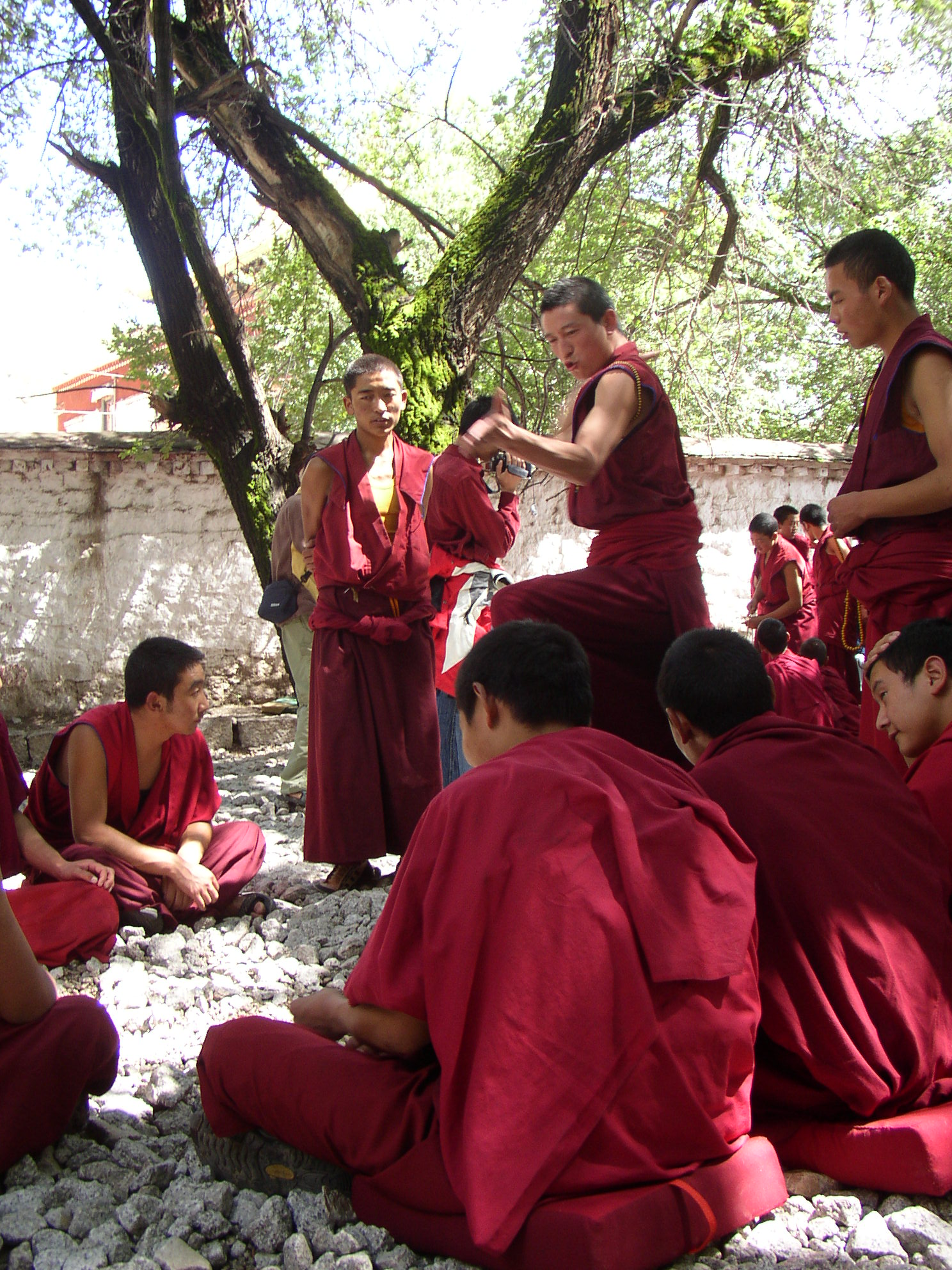
Buddhist monks in Tibet

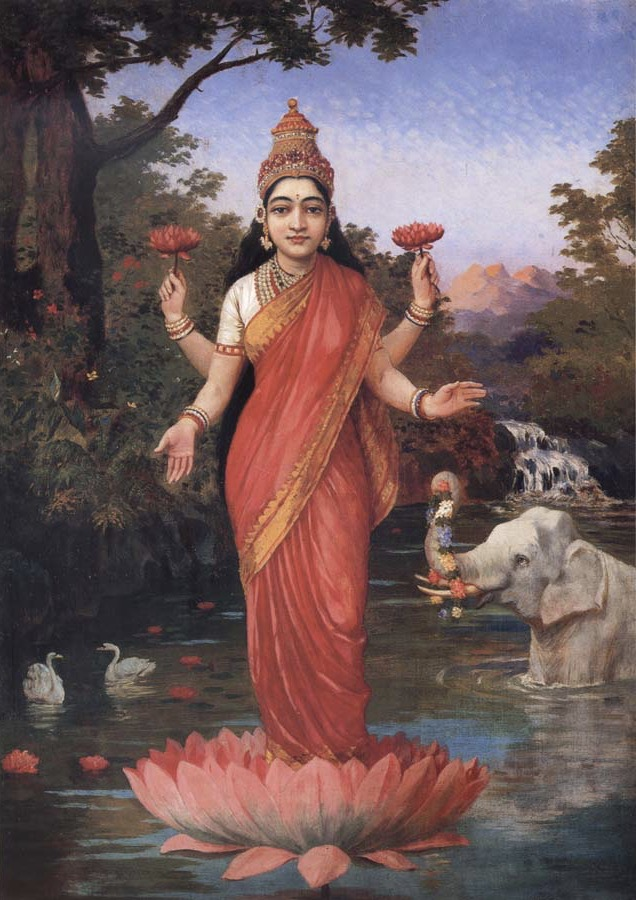
In Hinduism, red is associated with Lakshmi, the goddess of wealth and embodiment of beauty.

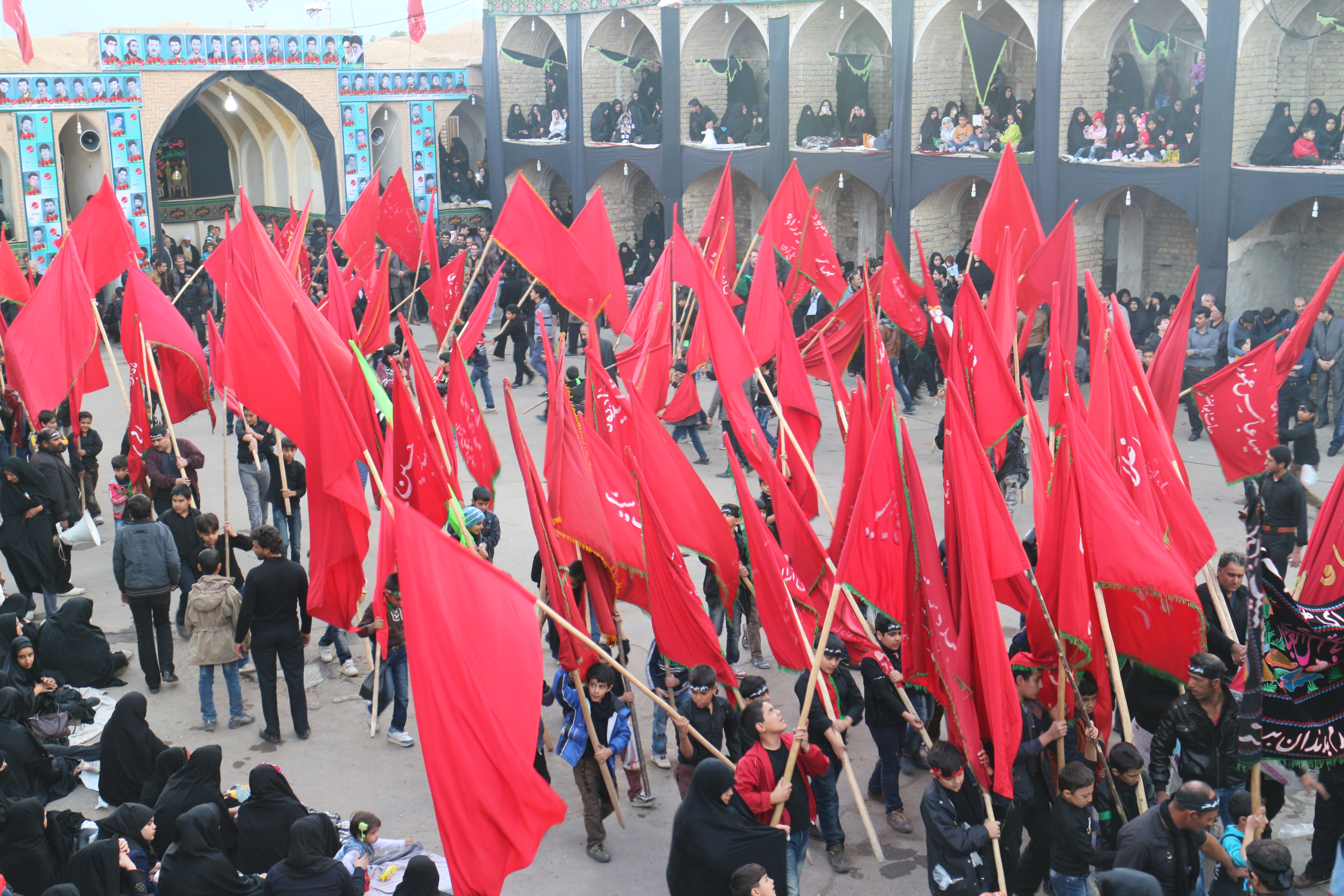
Red flags in a celebration of Muharram in Iran.

== Courtly love, the red rose, and Saint Valentine's Day ==
Red is the color most commonly associated with love, followed at a great distance by pink. It the symbolic color of the heart and the red rose, is closely associated with romantic love or courtly love and Saint Valentine's Day. Both the Greeks and the Hebrews considered red a symbol of love as well as sacrifice.

The Roman de la Rose, the Romance of the Rose, a thirteenth-century French poem, was one of the most popular works of literature of the Middle Ages. It was the allegorical search by the author for a red rose in an enclosed garden, symbolizing the woman he loved, and was a description of love in all of its aspects. Later, in the 19th century, British and French authors described a specific language of flowers – giving a single red rose meant 'I love you'.

Saint Valentine, a Roman Catholic Bishop or priest who was martyred in about 296 AD, seems to have had no known connection with romantic love, but the day of his martyrdom on the Roman Catholic calendar, Saint Valentine's Day (February 14), became, in the 14th century, an occasion for lovers to send messages to each other. In recent years the celebration of Saint Valentine' s day has spread beyond Christian countries to Japan and China and other parts of the world. The celebration of Saint Valentine's Day is forbidden or strongly condemned in many Islamic countries, including Saudi Arabia, Pakistan and Iran. In Saudi Arabia, in 2002 and 2011, religious police banned the sale of all Valentine's Day items, telling shop workers to remove any red items, as the day is considered a Christian holiday.

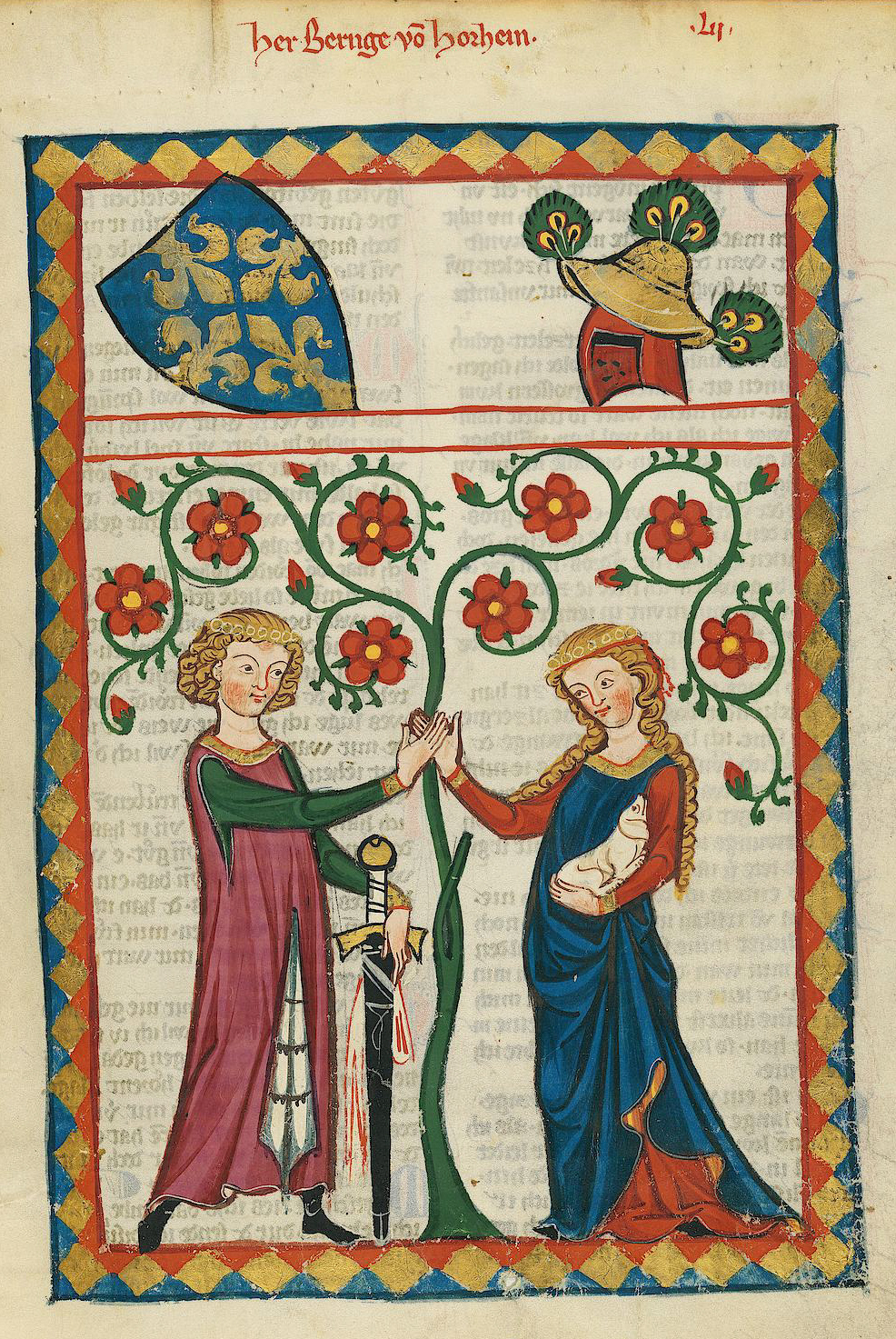
The Codex Manesse, a 14th-century collection of love songs. Red roses were symbol of courtly love.

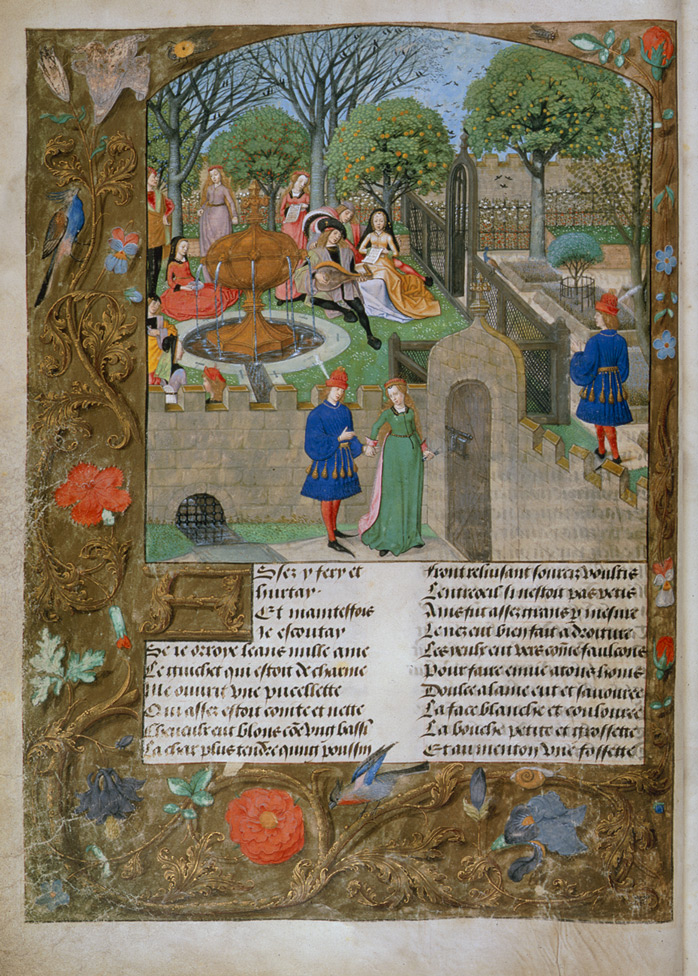
Fifteenth-century Illustration from the Roman de la Rose, a 13th-century French poem about a search for a red rose symbolizing the poet's love.

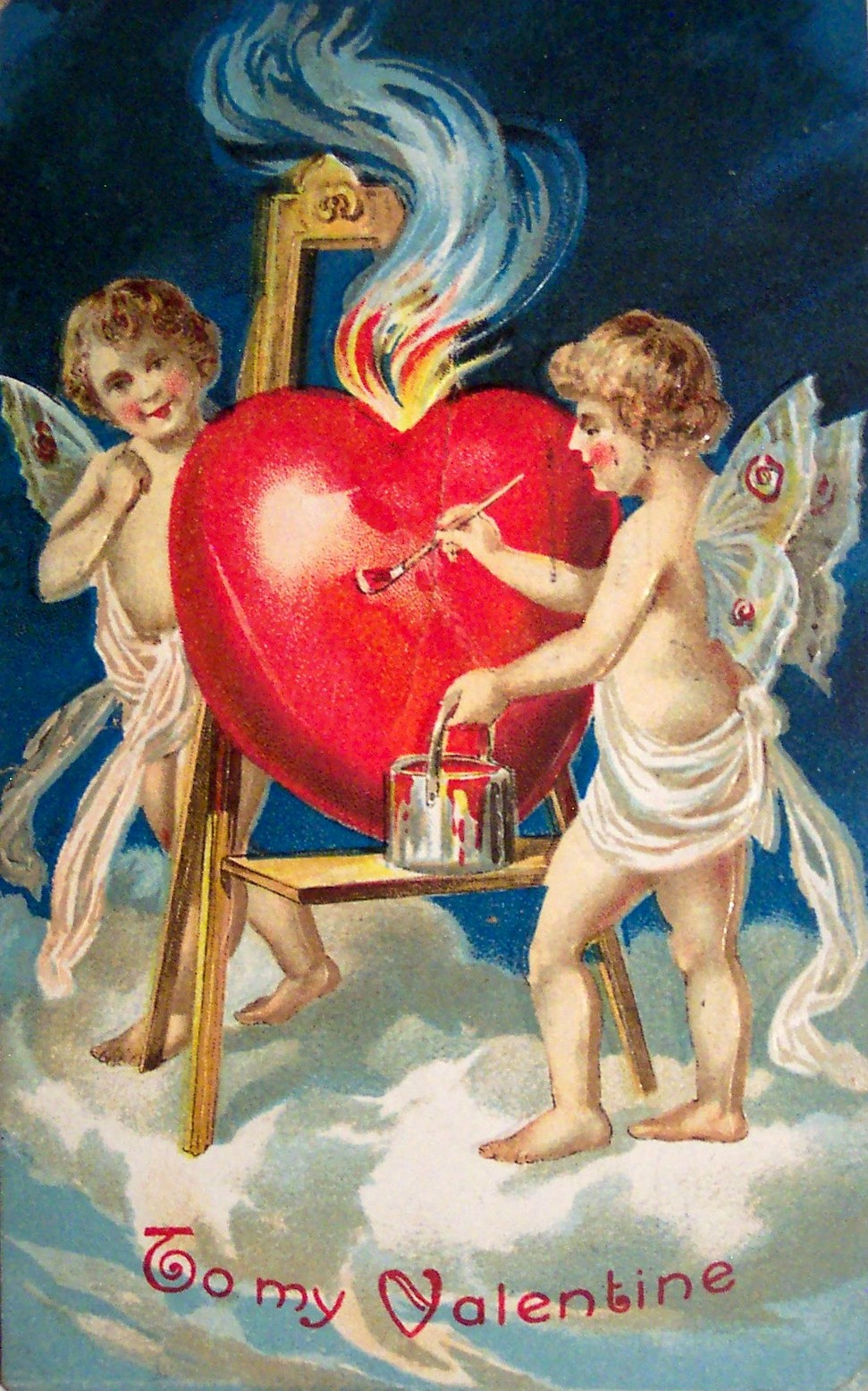
A valentine from 1909. The tradition of sending messages of love on February 14, Valentine's Day, dates back to the 14th century.

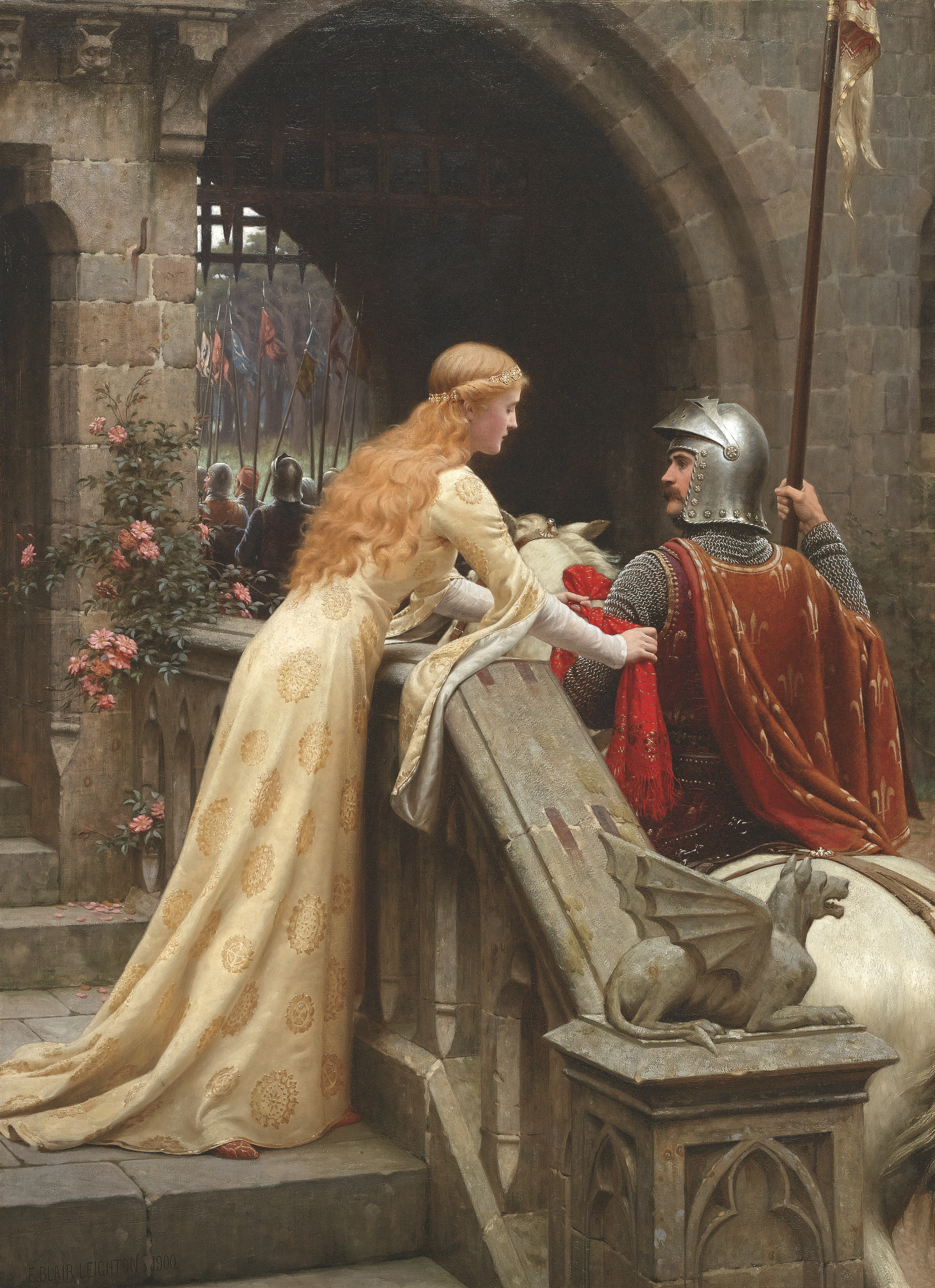
God Speed!, a Victorian era painting by Edmund Leighton of a Lady giving a red token of love to her knight.

== Happiness, celebration and ceremony ==
Red is the color most commonly associated with joy and well-being. It is the color of celebration and ceremony. A red carpet is often used to welcome distinguished guests. Red is also the traditional color of seats in opera houses and theaters. Scarlet academic gowns are worn by new Doctors of Philosophy at degree ceremonies at Oxford University and other schools. In China, it is considered the color of good fortune and prosperity, and it is the color traditionally worn by brides. In Christian countries, it is the color traditionally worn at Christmas by Santa Claus, because in the 4th century the historic Saint Nicholas was the Greek Christian Bishop of Myra, in modern-day Turkey, and bishops then dressed in red.

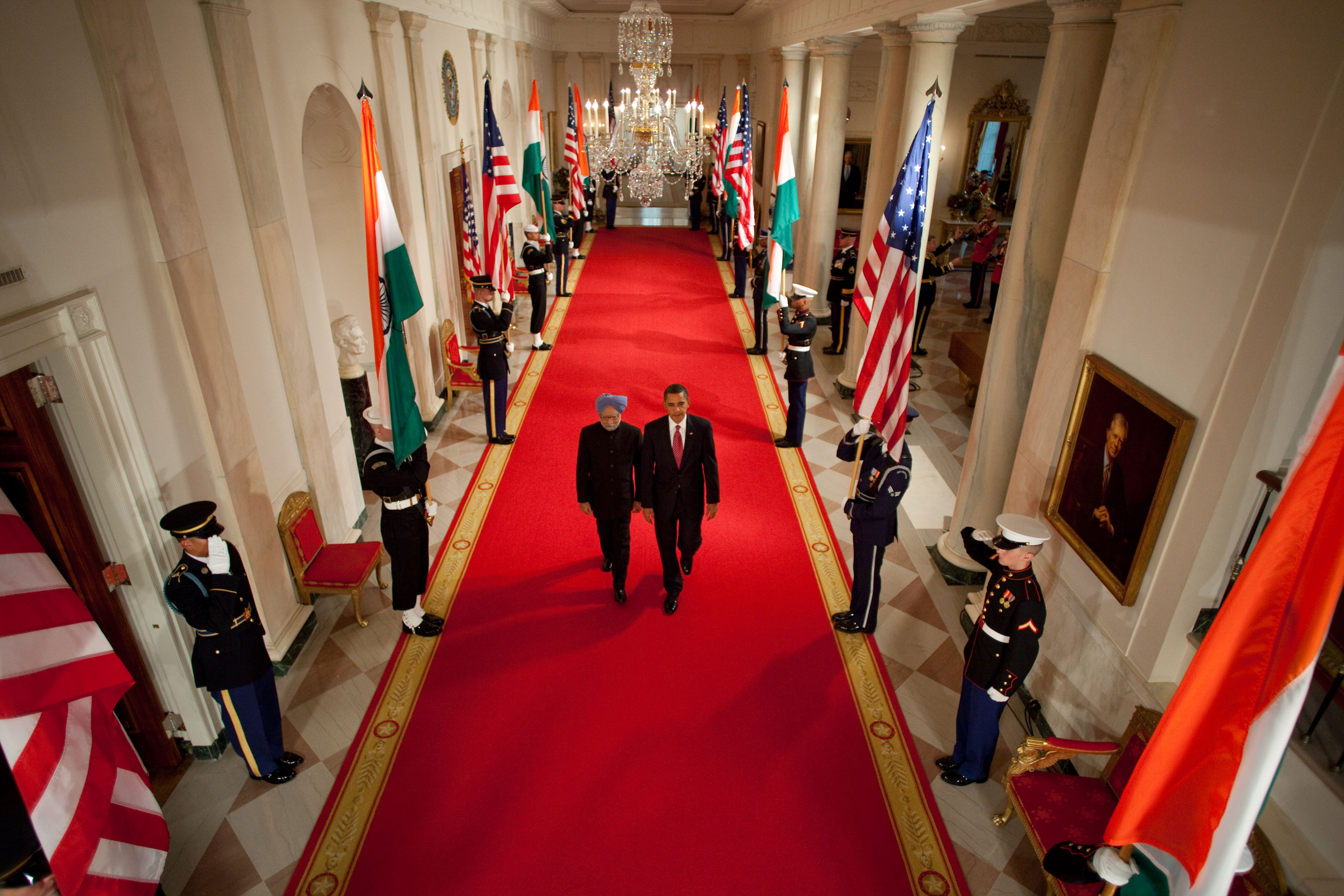
President Barack Obama and Prime Minister Manmohan Singh of India on a red carpet at the White House.

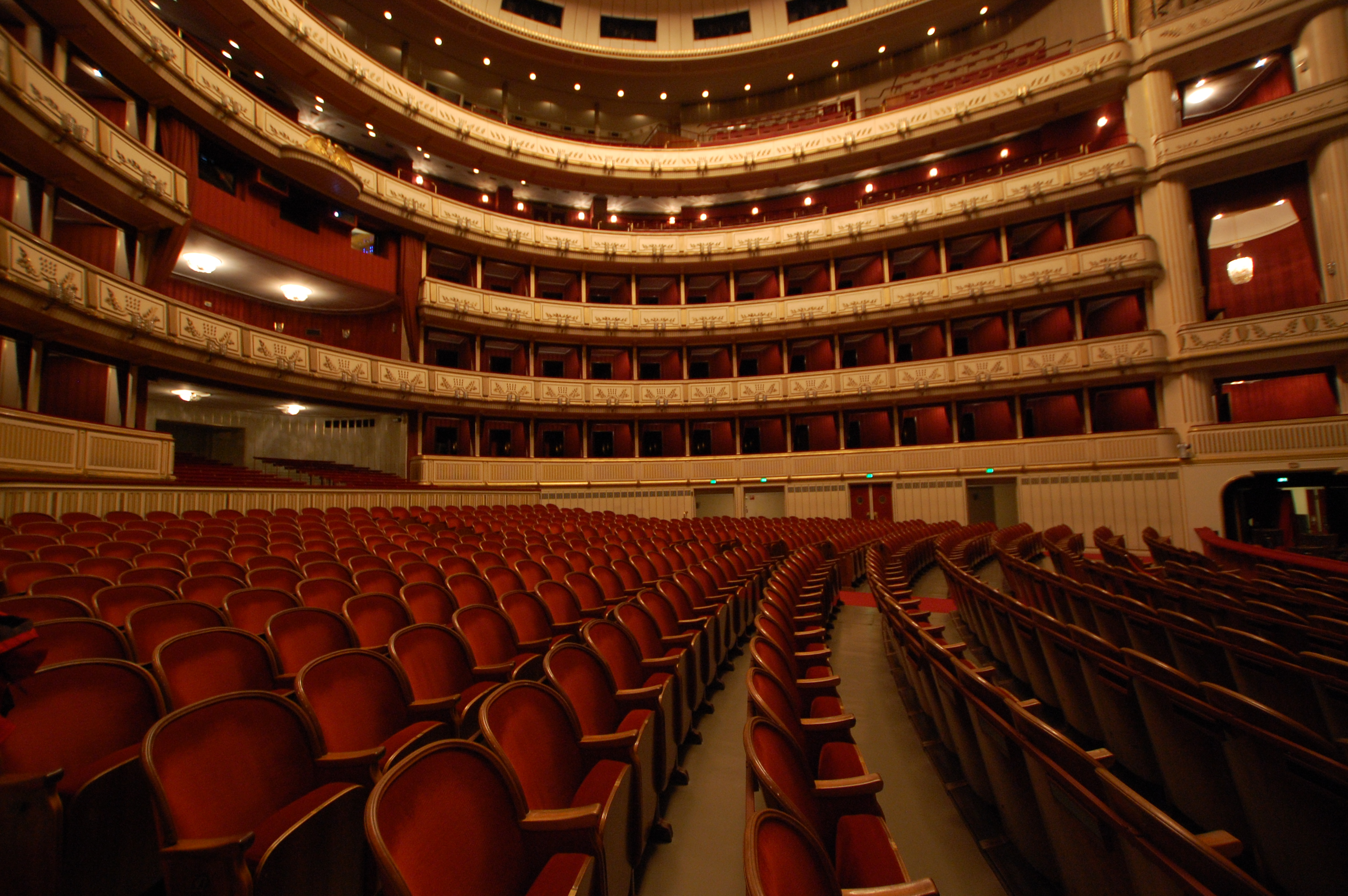
Seats in opera houses and theaters are traditionally red. This is the Opera House in Vienna.

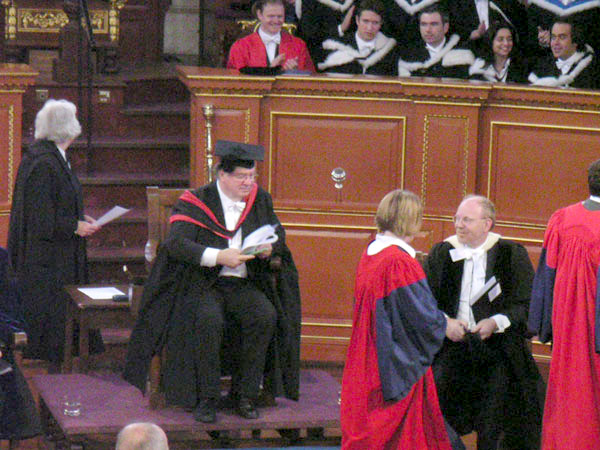
Scarlet academic gowns are worn by new Doctors of Philosophy at a degree ceremony at Oxford University.

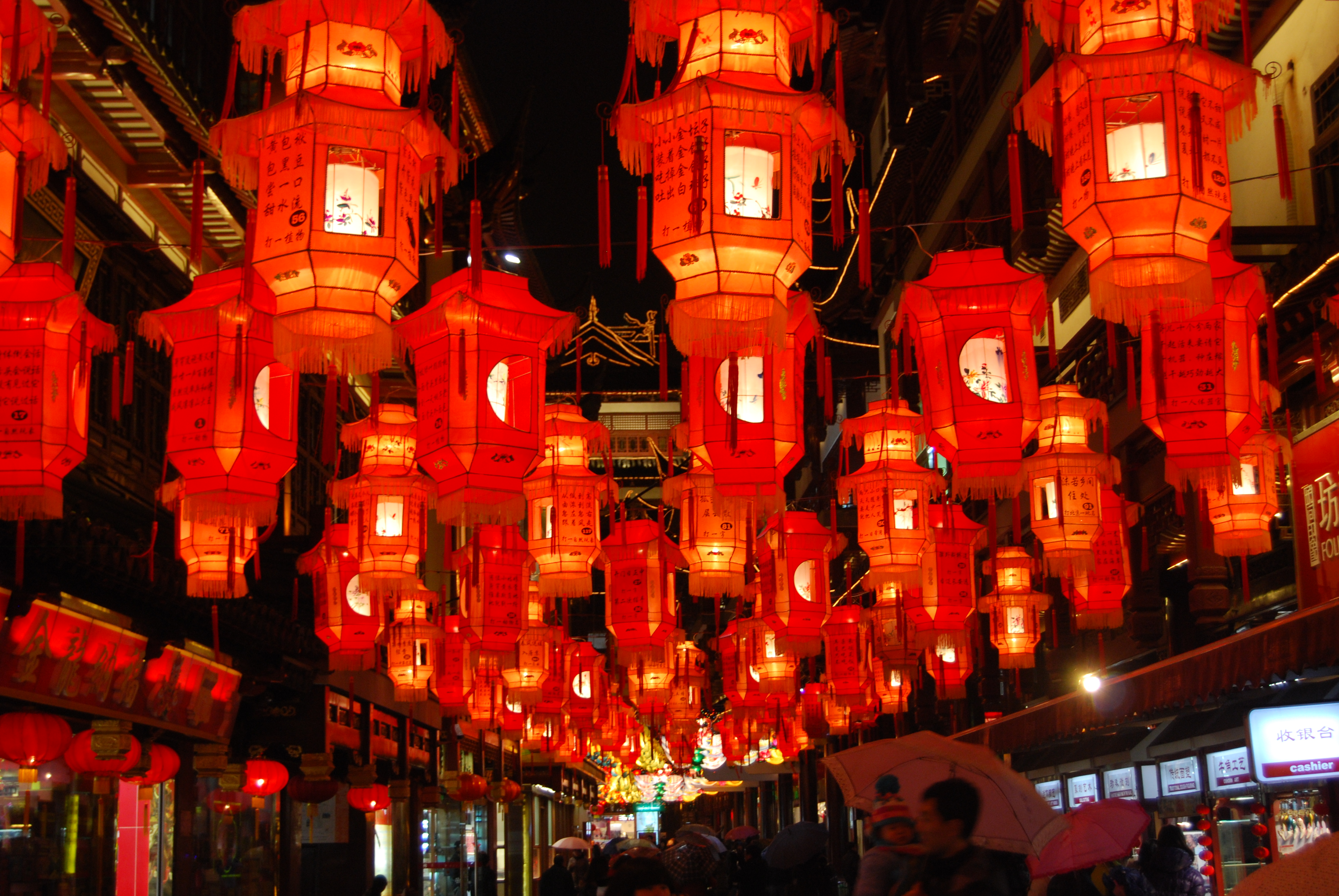
In China, red is the color of happiness and celebration. The Lantern Festival in Shanghai.

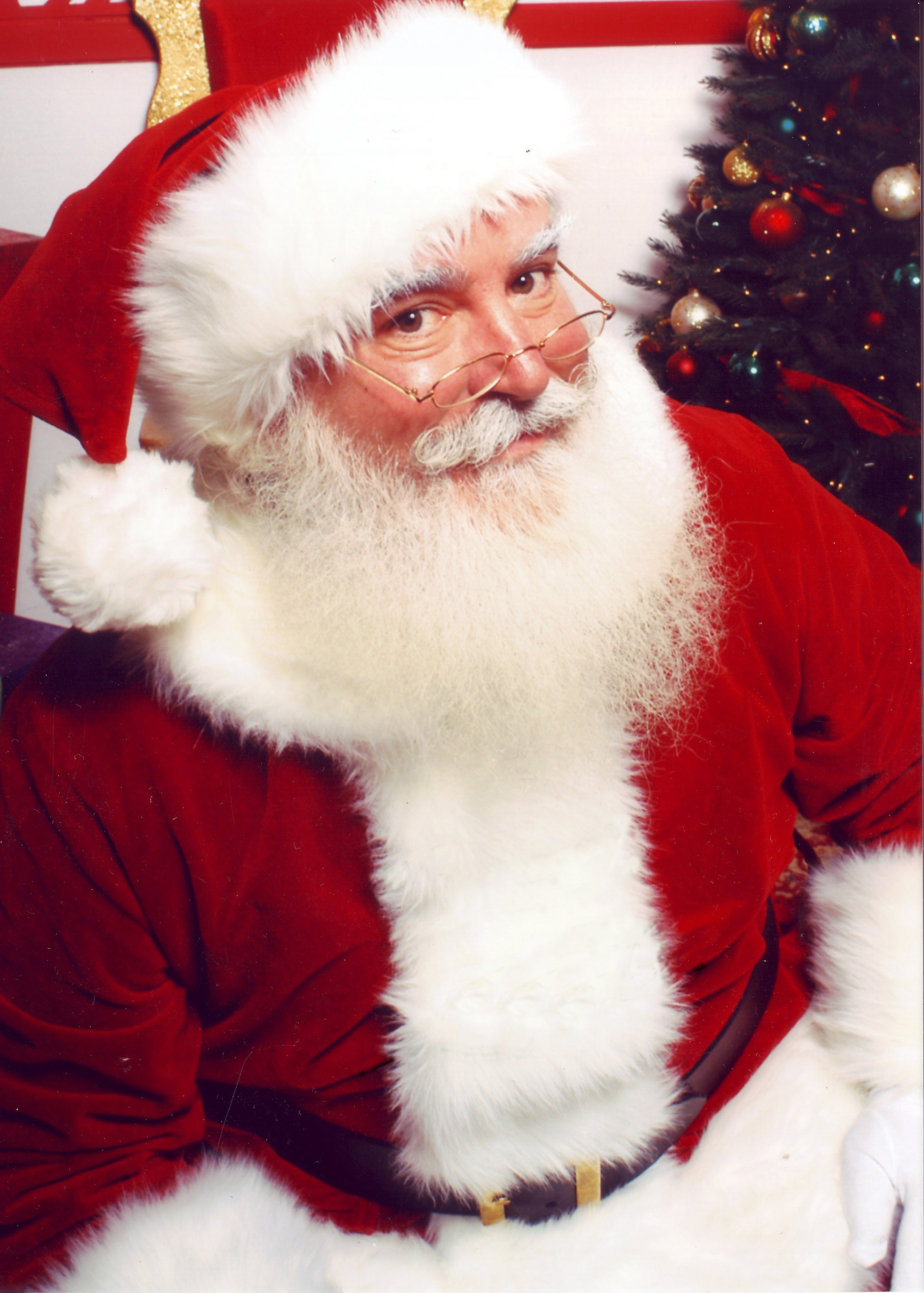
Santa Claus traditionally wears red, because the original Saint Nicholas was a bishop of the Greek Christian church in the 4th century.

=== Courage and sacrifice ===
Surveys show that red is the color most associated with courage. In western countries red is a symbol of martyrs and sacrifice, particularly because of its association with blood. Beginning in the Middle Ages, the Pope and Cardinals of the Roman Catholic Church wore red to symbolize the blood of Christ and the Christian martyrs. The banner of the Christian soldiers in the First Crusade was a red cross on a white field, the St. George's Cross. According to Christian tradition, Saint George was a Roman soldier who was a member of the guards of the Emperor Diocletian, who refused to renounce his Christian faith and was martyred. The Saint George's Cross became the Flag of England in the 16th century, and now is part of the Union Flag of the United Kingdom, as well as the Flag of the Republic of Georgia.

In 1587, Mary, Queen of Scots, accused of treason against Queen Elizabeth I, wore a red shirt at her execution, to proclaim that she was an innocent martyr.

The Thin Red Line was a famous incident in the Battle of Balaclava (1854) during the Crimean War, when a thin line of Scottish Highlander infantry, assisted by Royal Marines and Turkish infantrymen, repulsed a Russian cavalry charge. It was widely reported in the British press as an example of courage in the face of overwhelming odds and became a British military legend.

In the 19th-century novel The Red Badge of Courage by Stephen Crane, a story about the American Civil War, the red badge was the blood from a wound, by which a soldier could prove his courage.

The Crucified Martyr (Saint Julia) by the Dutch artist Hieronymus Bosch. Saint Julia wears red, the traditional color of Christian martyrs.

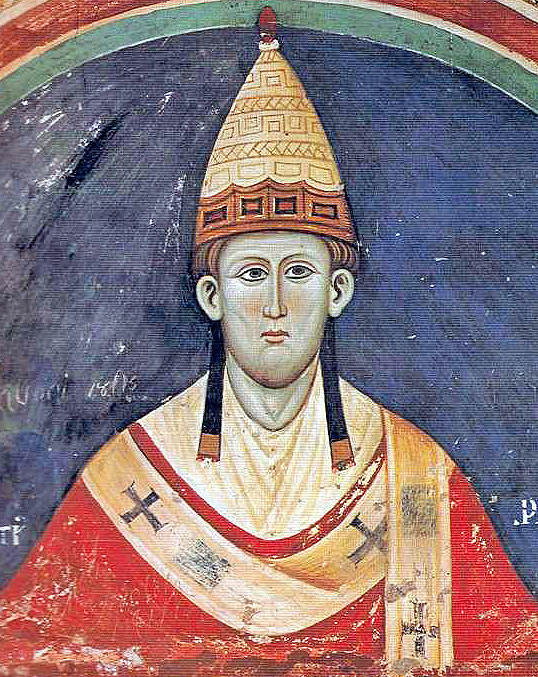
Roman Catholic Popes wear red as the symbol of the blood of Christ. This is Pope Innocent III, in about 1219.

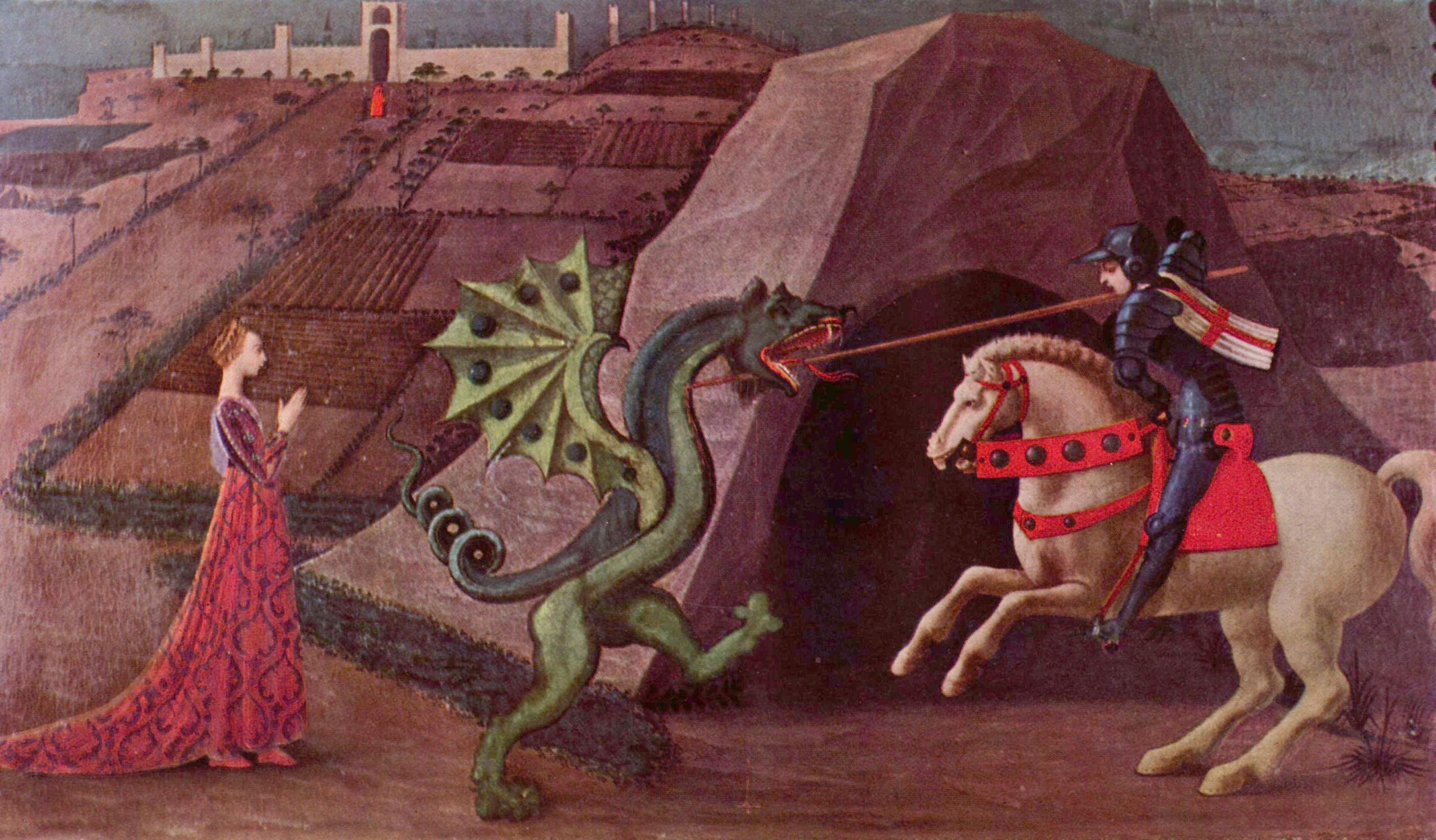
Saint George and the Dragon, by Paolo Uccello (1456–60). He wears the Saint George's Cross as a cape, which was also the banner of Milan.

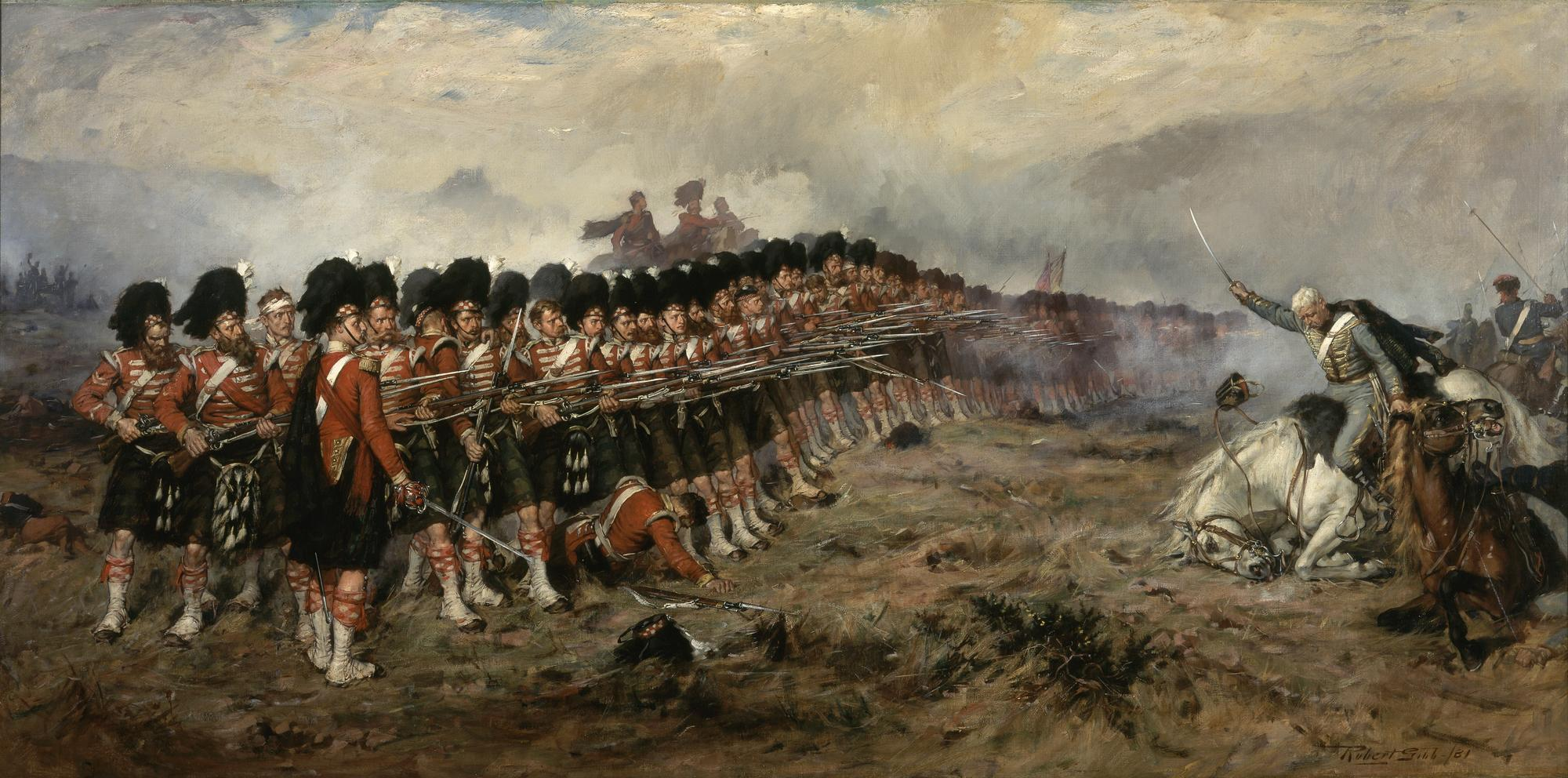
Robert Gibb's 1881 painting, The Thin Red Line, depicting The Thin Red Line at the Battle of Balaclava (1854), when a line of the Scottish Highland infantry repulsed a Russian cavalry charge. The name was given by the British press as a symbol of courage against the odds.

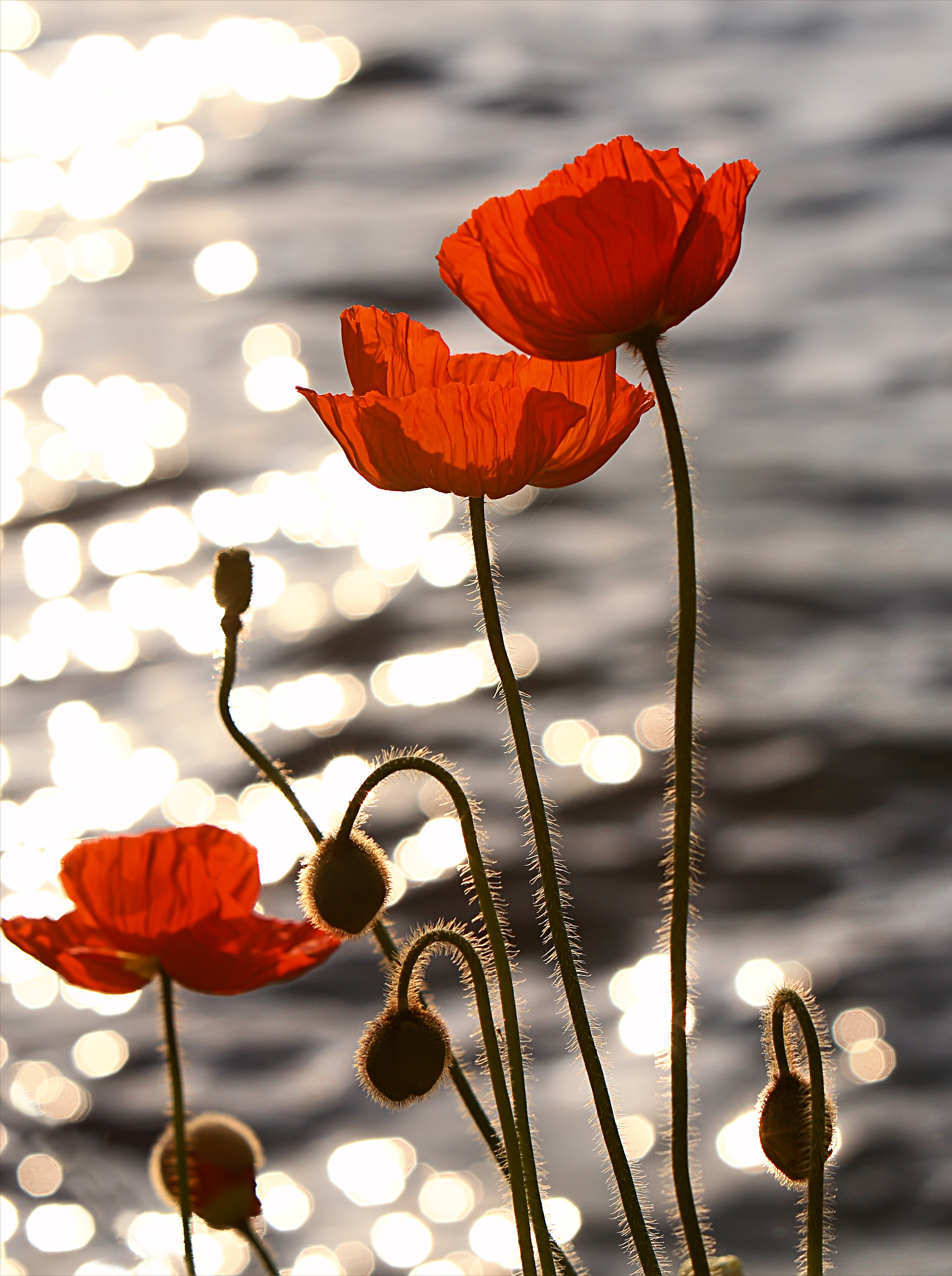
The red poppy flower is worn on Remembrance Day in Commonwealth countries to honor soldiers who died in the First World War.
