= Kerzhenets Nature Reserve =

Strict nature reserve in Nizhny Novgorod Oblast, Russia

Kerzhinski Nature Reserve
- Russian: Керженский заповедник (Also: Kerzhensky)
- IUCN category Ia (strict nature reserve)
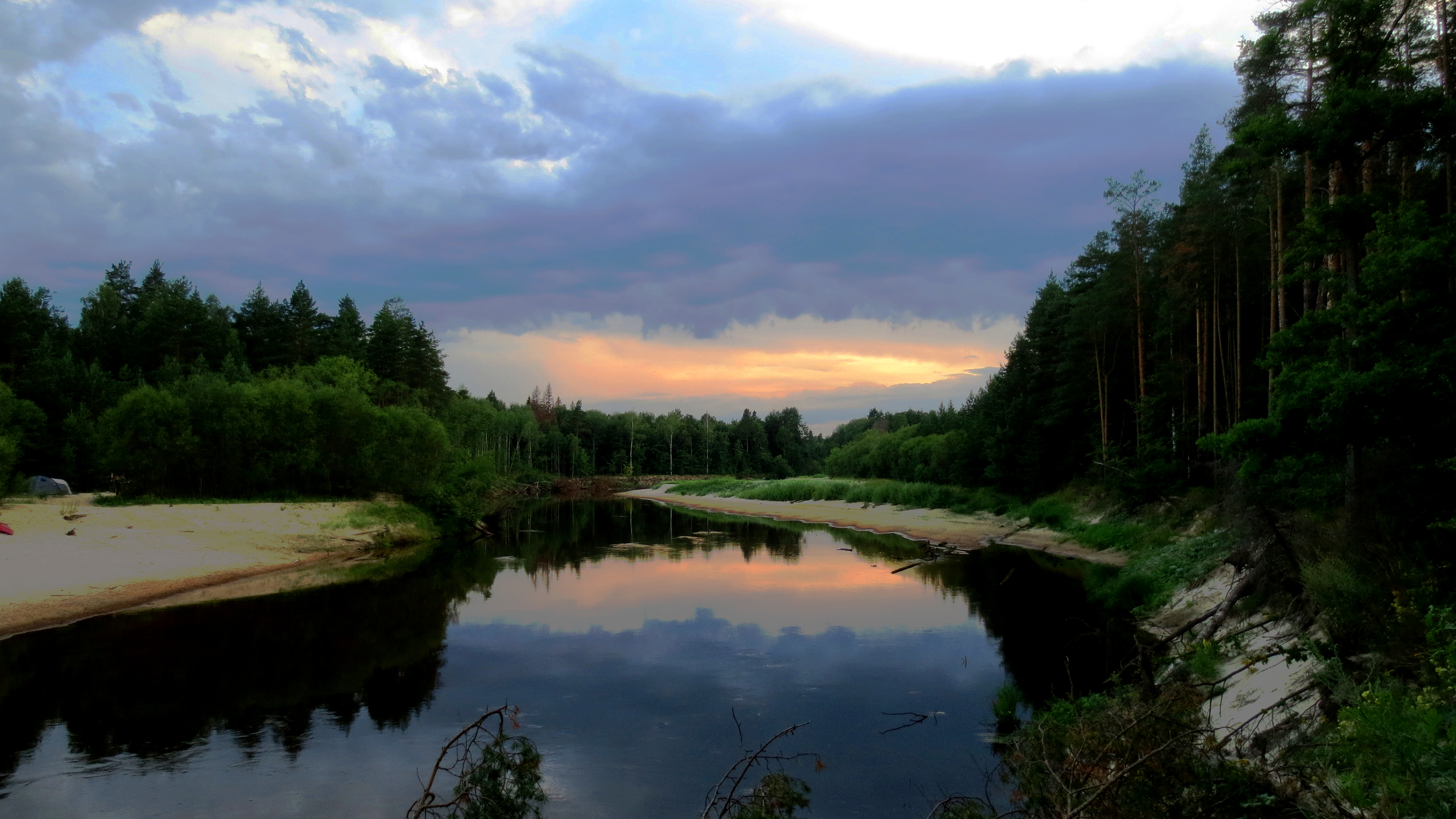
- Kerzhenets river

- Location within Russia
- Location: Nizhny Novgorod Oblast
- Nearest city: Nizhny Novgorod
- Coordinates: 56°37′0″N 44°29′30″E
- Area: 46,940 hectares (115,991 acres; 181 sq mi)
- Established: 1993
- Governing body: FGBI State Biosphere Reserve Taz
- Website: http://www.kerzhenskiy.ru/

The Kerzhinski Nature Reserve (Russian: Керженский, also Kerzhensky) is a Russian 'zapovednik' (strict nature reserve) located in the middle basin of the Kerzhenets River (a left-bank tributary of the Volga), 600 kilometres (370 mi) east of Moscow. The terrain features extensive upland and lowland swamps, and is known in particular as a site for the study of beavers, and their effects on recovery of the landscape after fires and logging. The reserve is situated 55 km northeast of the City of Nizhny Novgorod in the Bor and Semonov districts of Nizhny Novgorod Oblast. The site has been a center for scientific study of nature of the region since 1933. It is part of a UNESCO Biosphere Reserves, Ramsar wetland. The reserve was established in its current form in 1993, and covers an area of 46,940 ha (181.2 sq mi).

== Topography ==
The reserve is roughly 25 km across, and 40 km north of the Volga as it flows due east at this point. The north and west half of the reserve are forested, and the south and east are riverine wetlands. 80% of the territory is in the lowlands of the Kerzhenets river basin. The bedrock is Permian clay, marl and limestone overlain by 5 to 30 meters of alluvial sediments. The banks of the tributaries of the Kerzhenets are marked by outcrops of carbonate rocks.

== Climate and ecoregion ==
Kerzhinski is located towards the eastern edge of the East European forest steppe ecoregion. This ecoregion is a patchwork of broadleaf forest stands and grasslands (steppe) that stretches 2,100 km across eastern Europe from the middle of Ukraine to the Ural Mountains in Russia. The forest-steppe is an area of Russia in which precipitation and evaporation are approximately equal.

The climate of Kerzhinski is Humid continental climate, cool summer (Köppen climate classification (Dfb)). This climate is characterized by large swings in temperature, both diurnally and seasonally, with mild summers and cold, snowy winters. The average January temperature is -12 C, July is 19 C. Annual precipitation averages 550 mm. Winds in the summer are from the northwest, but from the south and west the remainder of the year.

== Flora and fauna ==
The landscape displays features of Eastern European mixed forest, particularly peat bogs, pine forests (60% of the territory) and alder-birch forests (35% of the reserve) in the lower wetter regions, with associated plants and animals. The remainder of the landscape is swamp and transitional mire. The area was subject to extensive tree loss (to logging and fires, particularly a disastrous fire in 1972 that killed 20% of the trees), so the stands are mostly middle-aged or younger. A recent study of the reserve recorded 103 species of algae, 283 of mushrooms, 205 of lichens, 160 of bryophytes and 593 species of vascular plants.

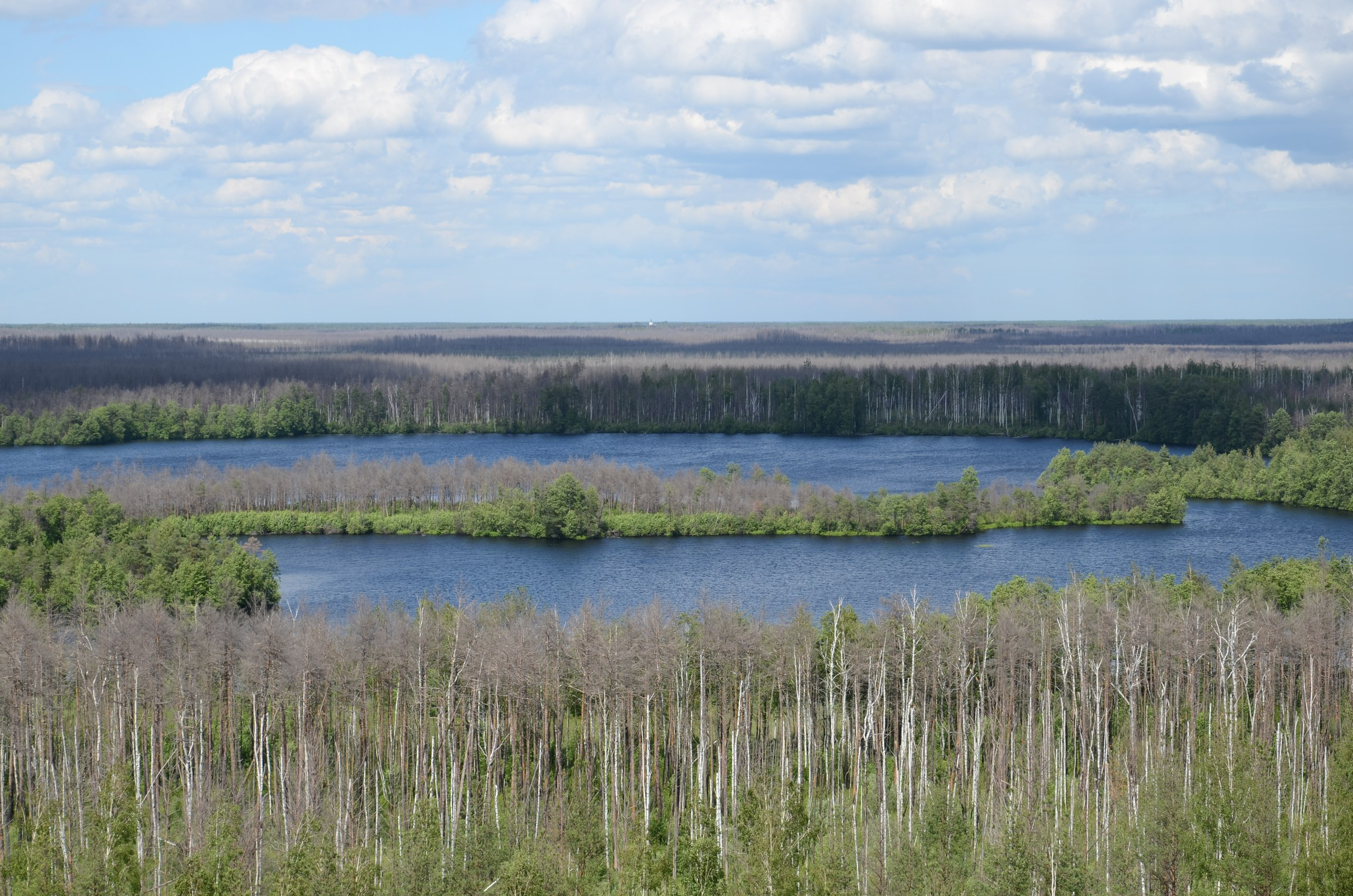
Black Lake, Kerzhinsky

Because the reserve is in a transitional zone on the edges of three regions - taiga, broadleaf forest, and steppe - it has animals that are representative of each. Taiga species include caribou, wolverine and squirrel. Broadleaf forests to the west contribute martens, minks, and wood mice. Steppe species include voles, hedgehogs, and field mice. Throughout are the larger mammals of the woods: wolf, fox, badger, stoat, weasel, and bear. Part of the work of the reserve is experimenting with the re-introduction and recovery of species that have been lost to the territory. Current reintroduction efforts are focused on the muskrat, the Willow ptarmigan, and the forest reindeer.

== Ecotourism ==
As a strict nature reserve, the Kerzhenski Reserve is mostly closed to the general public, although scientists and those with 'environmental education' purposes can make arrangements with park management for visits. There are three main 'ecotourist' routes that have been developed for tourists: a floodplain tour, a swamp tour, and a forest tour. The reserve has also opened a visitor center. The main office is in the town of Rustai.

== See also ==
- List of Russian Nature Reserves (class 1a 'zapovedniks')
- National parks of Russia
- Protected areas of Russia
