= Khokhloma =

Russian wood painting handicraft style and national ornament

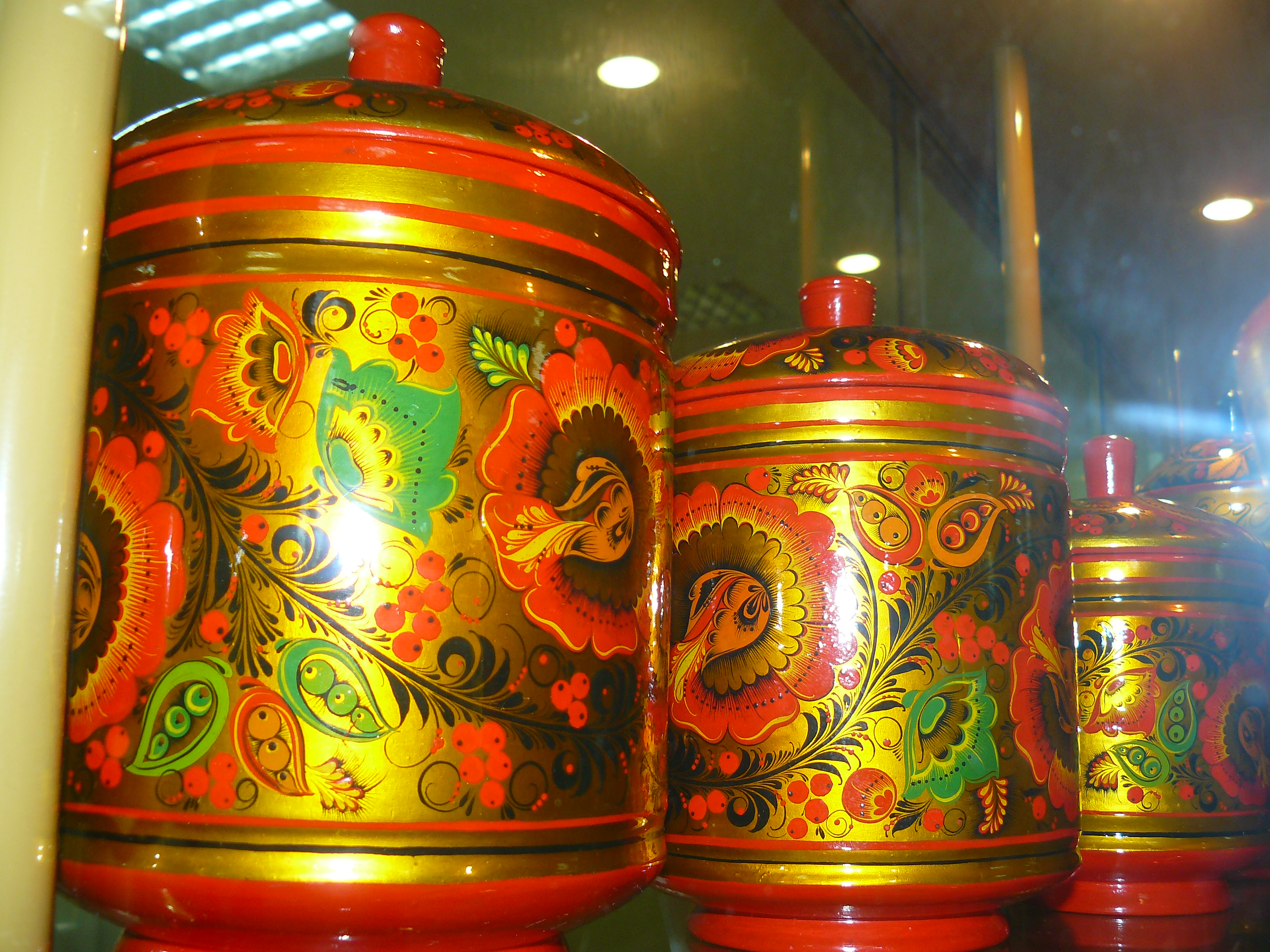
Khokhloma set

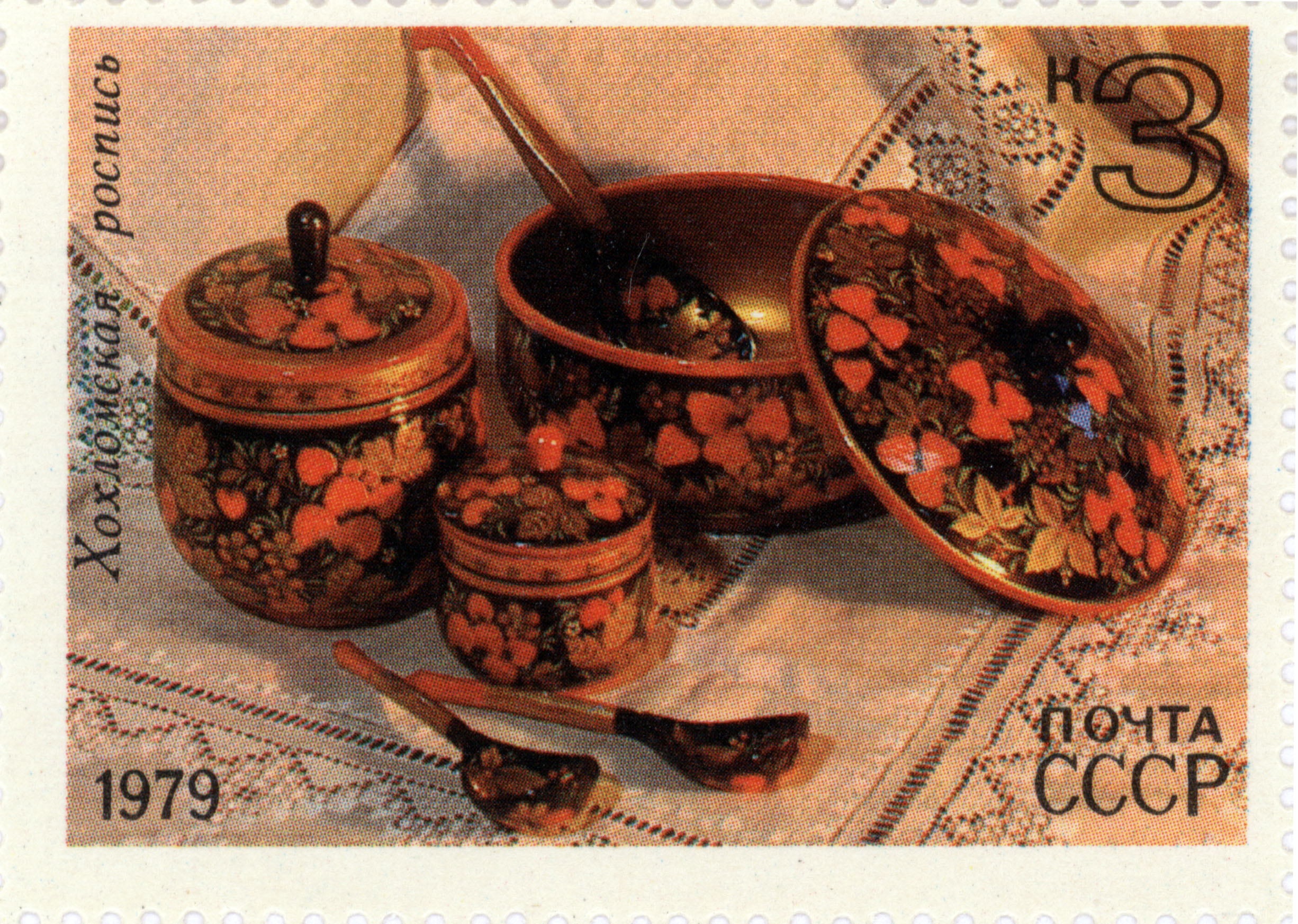
Khokhloma tableware on a Soviet postage stamp.

Khokhloma (also Hohloma, Russian: хохлома; Russian pronunciation: [xəxɫɐˈma]) or Khokhloma painting (хохломская роспись, hohlomskaya rospis) is a style of Russian art traditionally painted on wooden household items. It is known for its curved linear features depicting vivid small flowers, berries, grasses, and leaf motifs. The Firebird, a common and popular figure from the Russian fairytales is often featured as the main subject matter.

The style is named after the village of Khokhloma (56.973°N 43.902°E) in Koverninsky District, Nizhny Novgorod Oblast, Volga region, where it first appeared in the second half of the 17th century. This region is known for wood crafts ranging from small household goods to carvings on gables and gates in the traditional peasant cottages. The abundance of timber made for prolific and notable woodcarving traditions emerge throughout the centuries. Alongside Khokhloma, there are other wood painting styles and traditions as well as birch wood carvings throughout the Volga region.

== Design elements and creative process ==
Typical color schemes for Khokhloma include a combination of red, black, and gold. However, the gold appearance is not typically real gold. The process involves coating the wood with drying oil, applying powdered aluminum (historically other metals have been utilized), and painted with heat resistant oil paints, and varnished. The works are then put in a kiln. When the varnish is heated it gives a yellow/gold tint to the works emulating a gold-like appearance. The effect it has when applied to wooden tableware or furniture, making it look heavier and metallic.

There are two principal wood painting techniques used in the Khokhloma, such as the so-called "superficial technique" (red and black colors over the goldish one) and the "background technique" (a goldish silhouette-like design over the colored background).

=== Saltcellars and breadboxes ===
Saltcellars and breadboxes were significant pieces of household wares in Russian hospitality. Many of these saltcellars were carved in the shape of a duck with a sliding lid on the duck’s back and wings. Breadboxes were typically carved in an oval shape which allowed for large surface areas to be painted on. There have been instances of firebirds, fish, and other animals being the main subject matter. While the Khokhloma style is used on these items, it is not the only painting style depicted on saltcellars or breadboxes.

== History ==
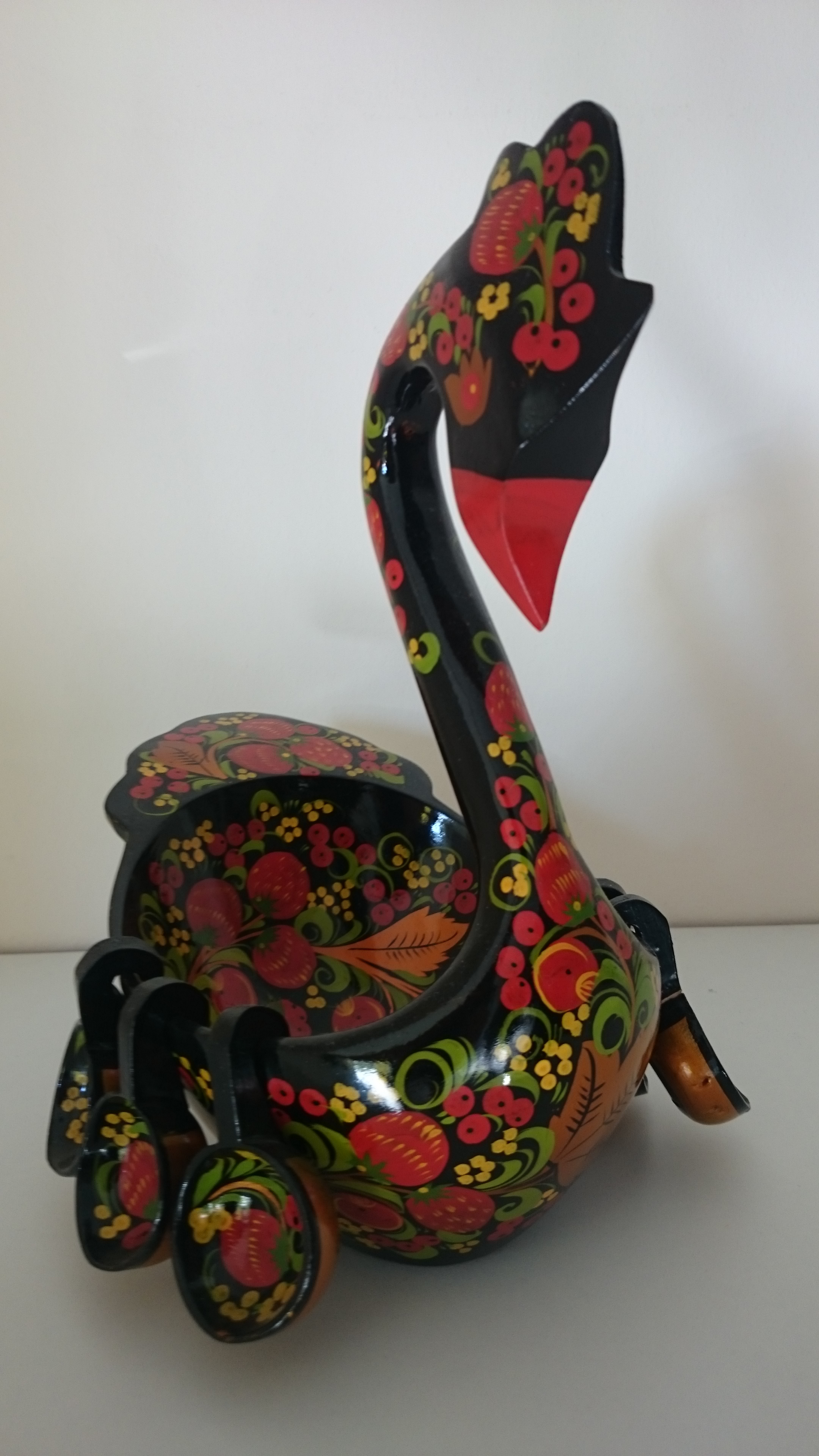
Khokhloma painting on a wooden ladle in the shape of a swan, made in Nizhny Novgorod

The production of painted dishes in Khokhloma is first mentioned in 1659 in the letter of a boyar called Morozov to his bailiff, containing an order for the following: "One hundred painted dishes polished with powdered tin, both large and medium, of the very same kind possessed by us earlier, not forgetting twenty large painted wine bowls, twenty medium, and twenty somewhat smaller".

The handicraft owes its origin to the Old Believers, who, fleeing from persecutions of officials, took refuge in local woods. However, even earlier, local villagers had experience in making tableware from soft woods. Among the schismatics there were icon-painters, who taught local craftsmen the special technique of painting wood in a golden color without the use of genuine real gold.

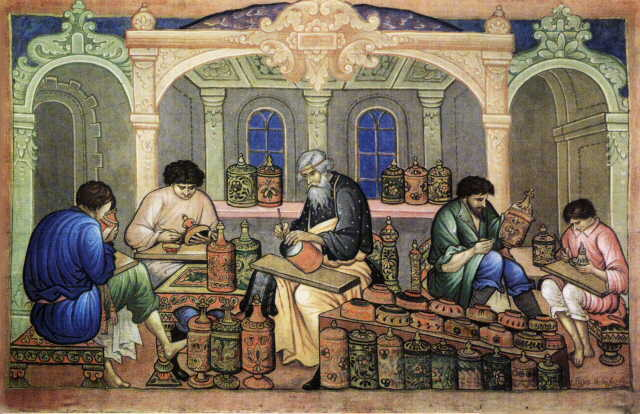
Ivan Bakanov. Khokhloma artists at work. Palekh miniature, 1929.

In its early days, Khokhloma became known in the Orient and Khokhloma pieces were produced for Indian and Persian markets. Through an exhibition in Paris at the end of the 19th century, the Khokhloma style became known in the west.

Due to the increasing number of factories and modern products, the late 19th and early 20th century saw a significant decline in folk art production and necessity at large. The two largest components that impacted Khokhloma production significantly were the rising costs of timber and competition with factories.

=== Revitalization efforts under the Soviet Union ===
The Khokhloma style was revitalized during the Soviet era. The Khokhloma craftsmen united into artels in the 1920s to early 1930s. During these decades more of the commonplace designs that we associate with the Khokhloma were expanded upon and brought more creative endeavors in the design process.

In the 1960s, the Soviets built a factory called the Khokhloma Painter near the Khokhloma village and an industrial association called the Khokhloma Painting in a town of Semyonov. These two factories have become the Khokhloma centers of Russia and produce tableware, utensils (mostly spoons), furniture, souvenirs, etc.

=== Museums and cultural centers ===
Unique works of Khokhloma art can be seen in a Khokhloma Museum that was opened in the factory of Semyonov in 1972. Among them there is a huge Khokhloma spoon 2 meters and 67 cm large and a bowl one and a half meter large.

In 2008 a new museum and cultural center called Золотая хохлома (Rough English translation: "Golden Khokhloma"), opened its doors to the public as a museum and tourist center. This museum features numerous examples of Khokhloma works for visitors to enjoy. There is also a 3D tour available on their website.

== Gallery ==
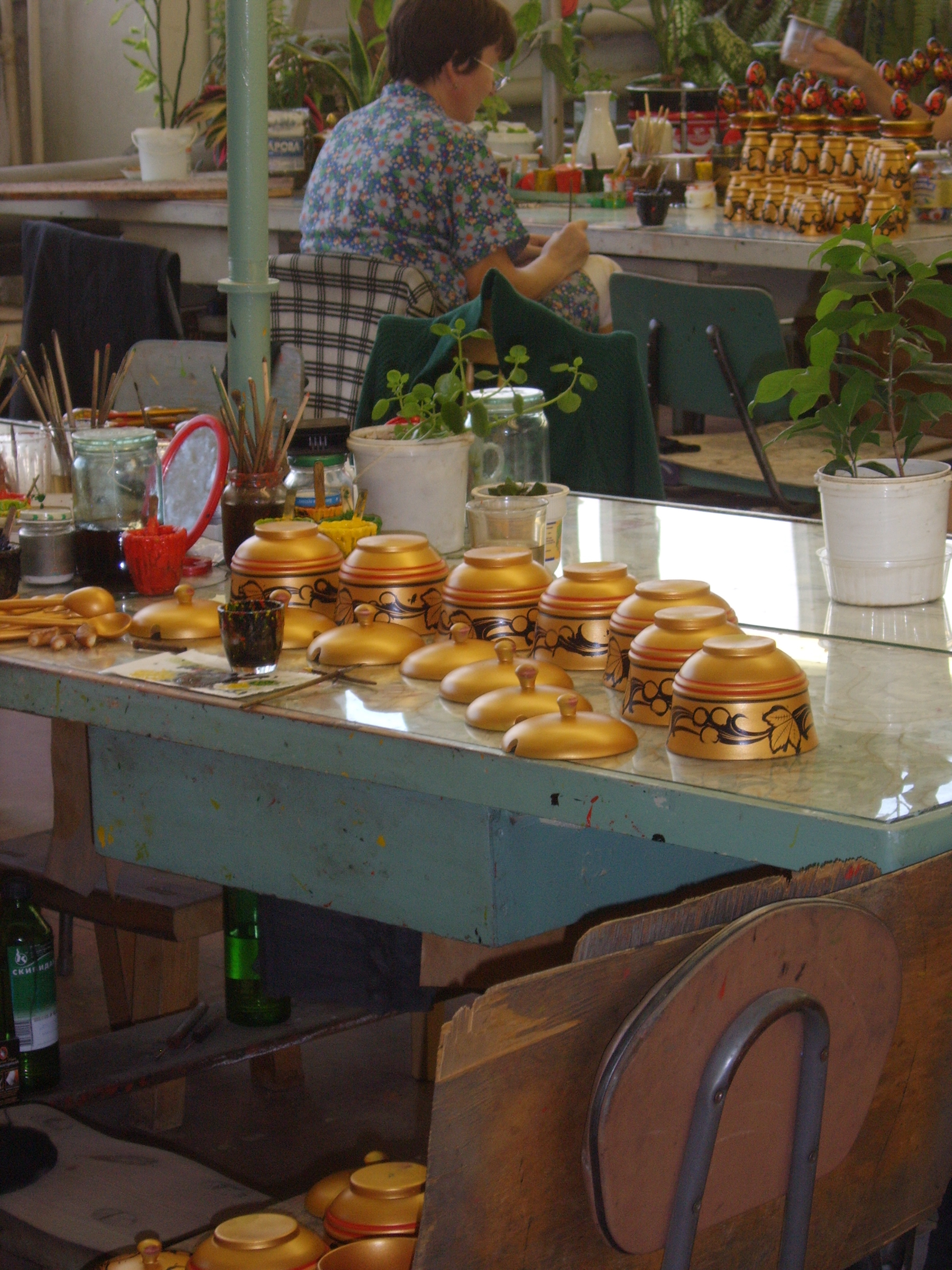
Khokhloma during production

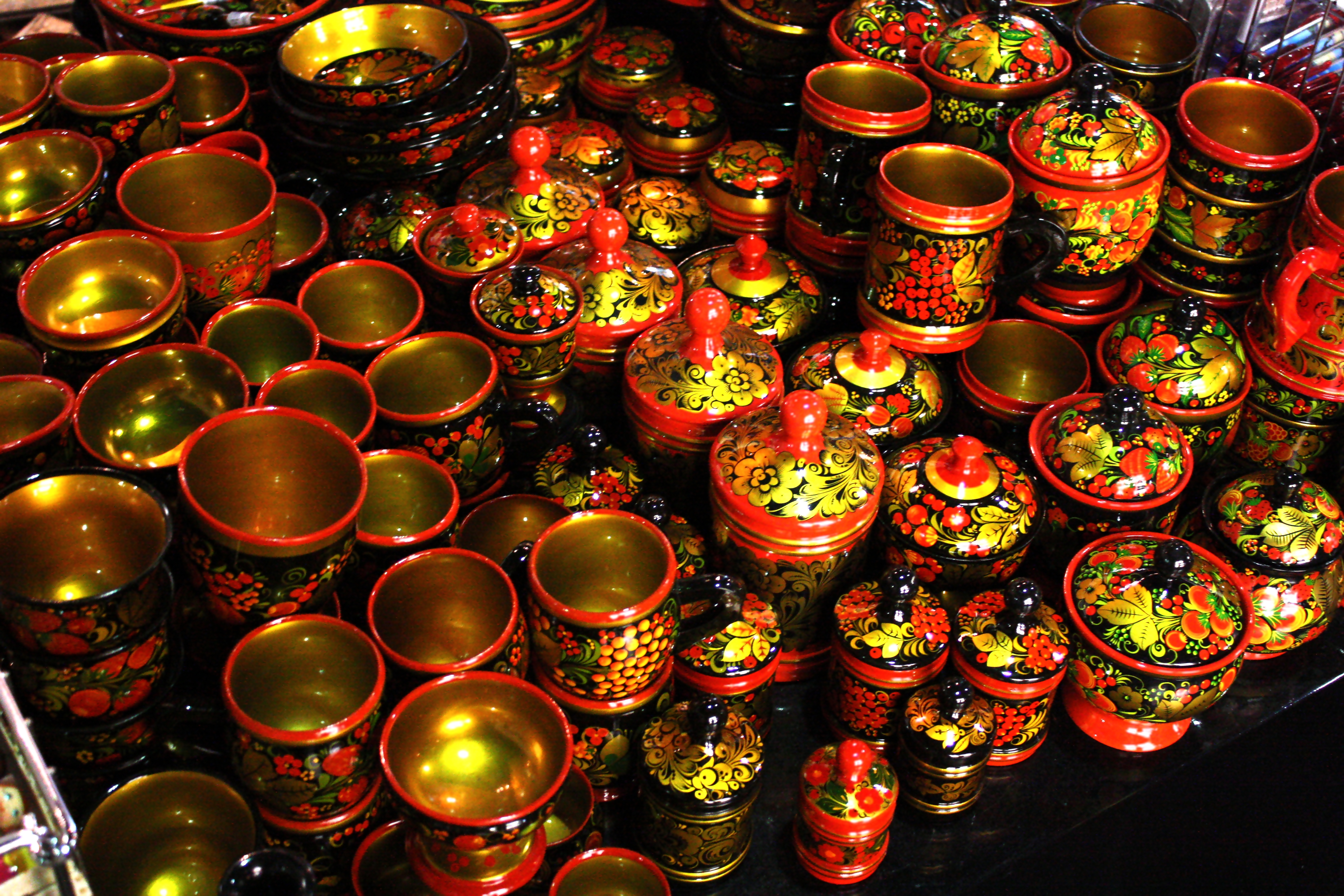
Khokhloma wares

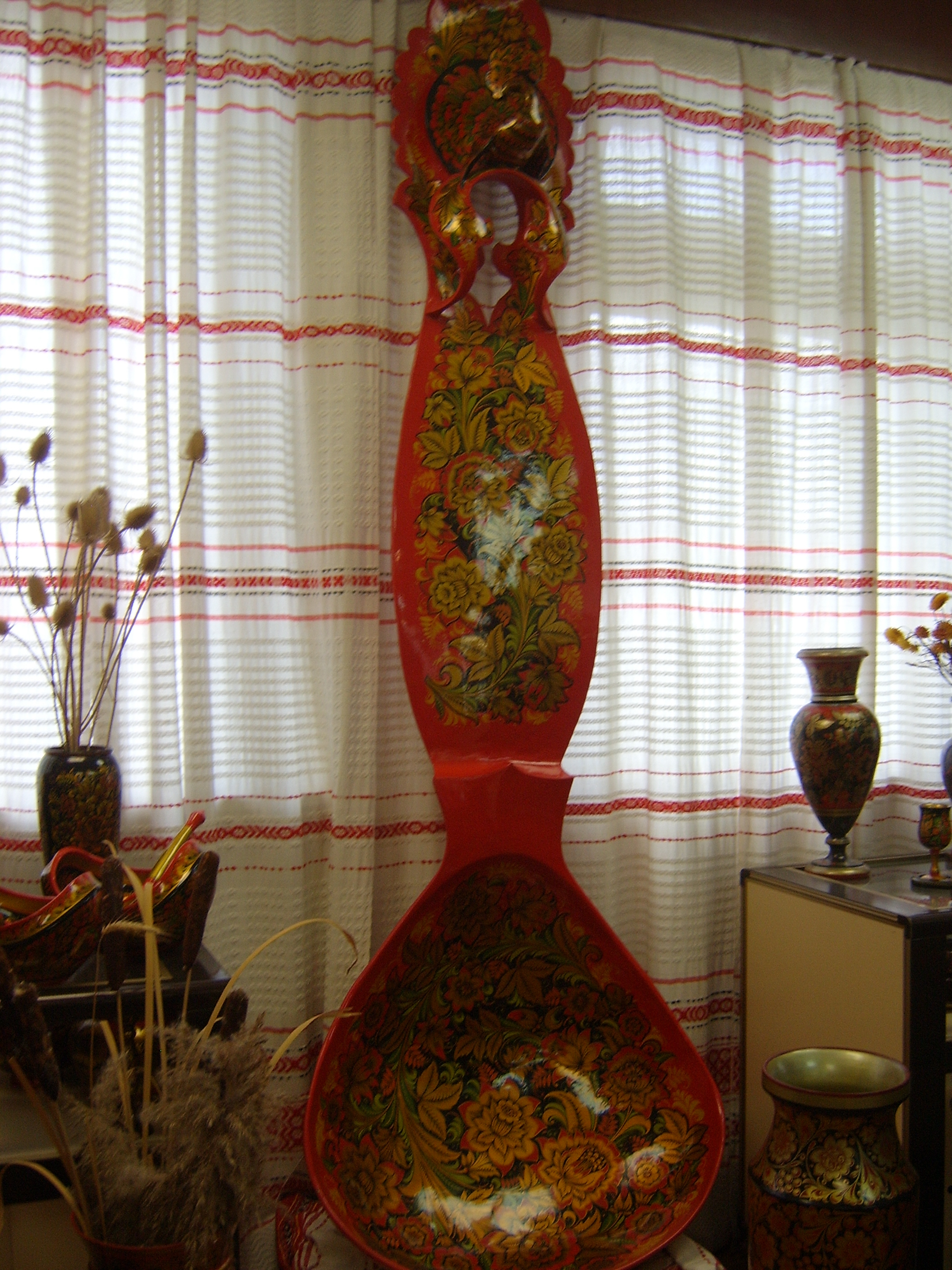
Khokhloma giant spoon

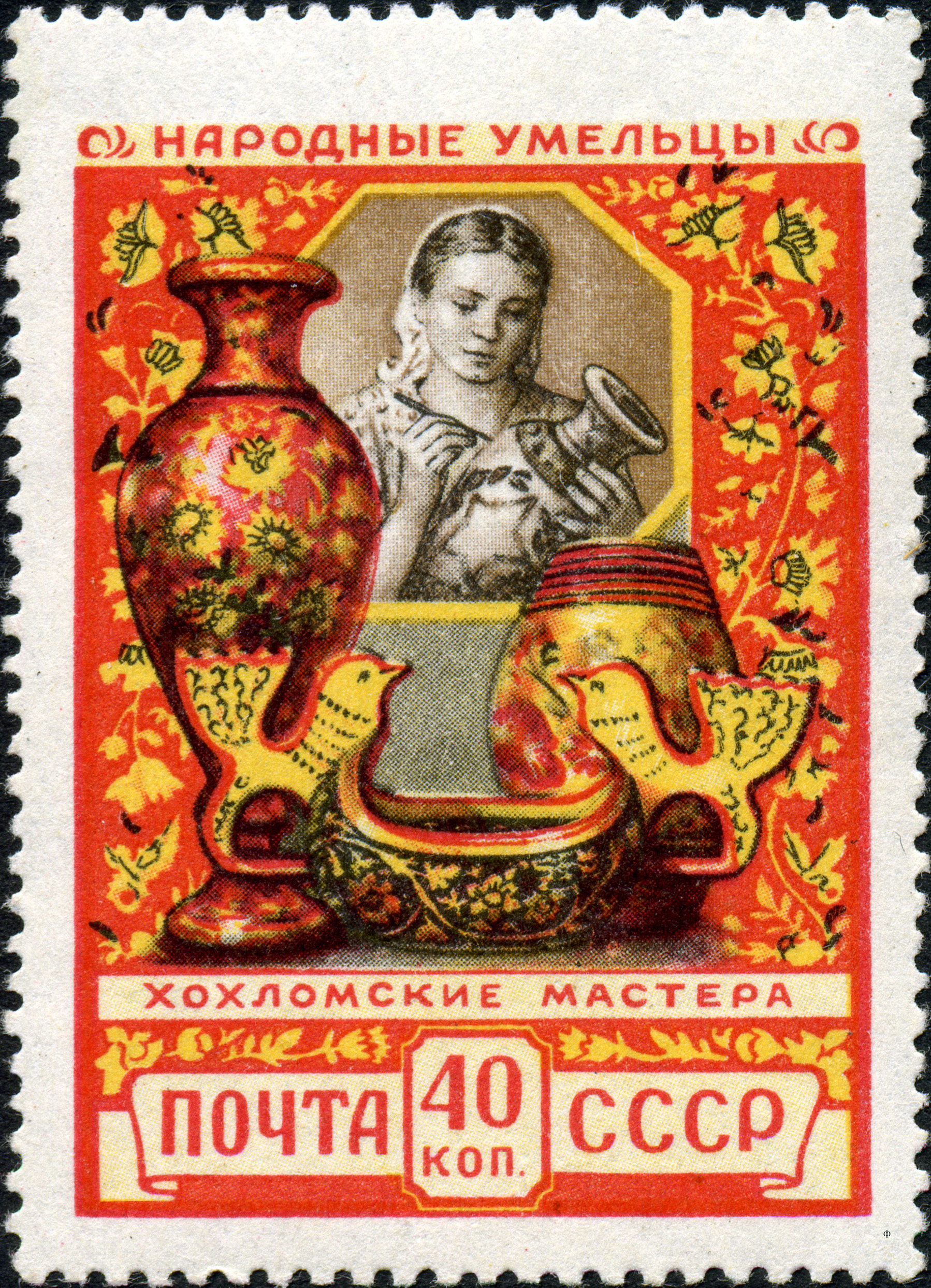
1957 stamp

== See also ==
- List of Russian inventions
