= Index of Eastern Christianity–related articles =

Alphabetical list of Eastern Christianity-related articles on English Wikipedia

== A ==
- Abraham the Great of Kashkar
- Abuna
- Albanian Greek-Catholic Church
- Albanian Orthodox Church
- Alexandrian Rite
- Ancient Church of the East
- Antiochene Rite
- Antiochian Orthodox Christian Archdiocese of North America
- Antiochian Orthodox Church
- Archimandrite
- Armenian Apostolic Church
- Armenian Catholic Church
- Armenian Catholic Patriarchs
- Assyrian Church of the East
- Assyrian Evangelical Church
- Athenagoras (Patriarch)
- Autocephaly
- Avvakum

== B ==
- Babai the Great
- Baptism of Kievan Rus'
- Baradaeus, Jacob
- Beglopopovtsy
- Belarusian Greek Catholic Church
- Belokrinitskaya Hierarchy
- Belokrinitskoe Soglasie
- Binbirkilise
- Blachernitissa
- British Orthodox Church
- Bulgarian Orthodox Church
- Byzantine Catholic Metropolitan Church of Pittsburgh
- Byzantine Discalced Carmelites
- Byzantine Rite

== C ==
- Cathedral of Christ the Saviour (Moscow)
- Cathedral of the Dormition
- Catholicose of the East
- Catholicos-Patriarch of All Georgia
- Catholic-Orthodox joint declaration of 1965
- Celtic Orthodox Church
- Catholic Chaldean Patriarchs of Babylon
- Chaldean Catholic Church
- Chaldean Syrian Church
- Chora Church
- Christianity in Asia
- Christians in Iran
- Church of Greece
- Church of the Holy Apostles
- Church of the Tithes
- Church Slavonic language
- Coptic Christianity
- Coptic Catholic Church
- Coptic language
- Coptic Orthodox Church
- Cornelius (Jakobs)
- Cornelius (Rodousakis)
- Cornelius (Titov)
- Cypriot Orthodox Church
- Czech and Slovak Orthodox Church

== D ==
- Danilov Monastery
- Dayro d-Mor Hananyo
- Dayro d-Mor Gabriel
- Desert Fathers
- Divine Liturgy
- Donskoy Monastery
- Dormition of the Theotokos

== E ==
- East Syriac Rite
- Eastern Orthodox Church
- Eastern Orthodox Church calendar
- Eastern Orthodox Church organization
- Eastern Orthodox Patriarchate of Jerusalem
- Eastern Rite
- Eastern Rite Catholic Churches
- Ecumenical council
- Ecumenical Patriarch
- Encyclical of the Eastern Patriarchs
- Eparchy of Križevci
- Ephrem the Syrian
- Eritrean Orthodox Tewahdo Church
- Ethiopian Orthodox Tewahedo Church

== F ==
- Fedoseevtsy
- Finnish Orthodox Church
- Florovsky, Georges

== G ==
- Georgian Orthodox and Apostolic Church
- Great Lent
- Greek-Catholic Melkite Church
- Greek Old Calendarists
- Greek Orthodox Church
- Greek Church of Alexandria
- Gregory Palamas

== H ==
- Herman of Alaska
- Hesychasm
- Hilandar
- History of Christianity in Ukraine
- History of the Church of the East in Asia
- Holy Fire
- Holy Land
- Holy Synod
- Holy Synod of Jerusalem

== I ==
- Ilia II
- Indian Orthodox Church
- Italo-Albanian Catholic Church

== J ==
- Jacobite Orthodox Church
- Japanese Orthodox Church
- Jerusalem Patriarchate in America
- John Chrysostom
- John (Maximovitch) of Shanghai and San Francisco
- Joseph-Volokolamsk Monastery

== K ==
- Kazan Cathedral
- Kiev Pechersk Lavra
- Khomyakov, Aleksey
- Khutyn Monastery
- Knanaya

== L ==
- Latin Patriarch of Alexandria
- Latin Patriarch of Antioch
- Latin Patriarch of Constantinople
- Latin Patriarch of Jerusalem
- Lavra
- Lestovka
- Lipovan Orthodox Old-Rite Church
- List of Abunas of Eritrea
- List of Abunas of Ethiopia
- List of Archbishops of Athens
- List of Armenian Catholicoi of Cilicia
- List of Armenian Patriarchs of Constantinople
- List of Armenian Patriarchs of Jerusalem
- List of Catholicoi of Armenia
- List of Coptic Orthodox Popes of Alexandria
- List of Greek Orthodox Patriarchs of Alexandria
- List of Eastern Orthodox jurisdictions in North America
- List of Melkite Greek Catholic Patriarchs of Antioch
- List of metropolitans and patriarchs of Moscow
- List of Orthodox Patriarchs of Antioch
- List of Patriarchs of Alexandria
- List of Patriarchs of Antioch
- List of Patriarchs of Constantinople
- List of Syriac Orthodox Patriarchs of Antioch
- Liturgy of Addai and Mari
- Liturgy of the Presanctified Gifts

== M ==
- Macedonian Orthodox Church
- Major archbishop
- Malabar Independent Syrian Church
- Malankara Jacobite Syriac Orthodox Church
- Mar Thoma Church
- Mark the Evangelist
- Maron, John
- Maronite Church
- Miaphysitism
- Middle East Council of Churches
- Monolithic church
- Monophysitism
- Mount Athos
- Mystery of Crowning

== N ==
- Nestorianism
- Nestorius
- Nikolai of Japan

== O ==
- Old Believers
- Old calendarists
- Old Church Slavonic
- Omophorion
- Optina Monastery
- Oriental Orthodoxy
- Orientalium Ecclesiarum
- Orthodox Church of Antioch
- Orthodox Church of Constantinople
- Orthodox Church in America
- Orthodox Church in Italy
- Orthodox Ohrid Archbishopric

== P ==
- Panagia
- Patriarch Alexius II
- Patriarch Bartholomew I
- Patriarch Irenaios
- Patriarch of Alexandria
- Paulos (Abune)
- Pimen I (Patriarch)
- Pechersky Ascension Monastery
- Polish Orthodox Church
- Pomorian Old-Orthodox Church
- Popovtsy
- Prosphora

== R ==
- Rogozhskoye cemetery
- Romanian Church United with Rome, Greek-Catholic
- Romanian Orthodox Church
- Rublev, Andrei
- Russian Greek Catholic Church
- Russian icons
- Russian Old-Orthodox Church
- Russian Orthodox Church
- Russian Orthodox Church Outside of Russia
- Russian Orthodox Old-Rite Church
- Ruthenian Catholic Church

== S ==
- Sabbah, Michel
- Saint Basil's Cathedral
- Saint Catherine's Monastery
- Saint Sophia Cathedral in Kiev
- Saint Sophia Cathedral in Novgorod
- Saint Thomas Christians
- Saints Cyril and Methodius
- Serbian Orthodox Church
- Sergius (Tikhomirov) of Japan (Metropolitan)
- Sobor
- Sorsky, Nil
- Standing Conference of Orthodox Bishops in America
- Starets
- Studenica monastery
- Sui iuris
- Synod of Diamper
- Syriac Catholic Church
- Syriac Christianity
- Syriac Orthodox Church
- Syro-Malankara Catholic Church
- Syro-Malabar Church

== T ==
- Tekle Haymanot
- Teoctist
- Theodore of Mopsuestia
- Theodore II of Alexandria (Patriarch)
- Theofilos III of Jerusalem (Patriarch)
- Theotokos of St. Theodore
- Theotokos of Vladimir
- Tikhon of Moscow
- Tokyo Resurrection Cathedral
- Troitse-Sergiyeva Lavra

== U ==
- Ukrainian Autocephalous Orthodox Church
- Ukrainian Greek Catholic Church
- Ukrainian Orthodox Church - Kiev Patriarchy
- Ukrainian Orthodox Church - Moscow Patriarchy
- Ukrainian Orthodox Church of Canada
- Union of Brest

== V ==
- Valaam Monastery
- Mar Varkey Vithayathil
- Volodymyr (Viktor Sabodan) (Metropolitan)
- Velichkovsky, Paisius (Saint)

== W ==
- Wasyly (Metropolitan)

== Y ==
- Yurodivy
