= Beglopopovtsy =

One of the denominations among the Popovtsy

Beglopopovtsy (Russian: беглопоповцы, IPA: [bʲɪɡləpɐˈpoft͡sɨ], "followers of runaway priests") was one of the denominations among the Popovtsy, who belonged to the Old Believers.

Since none of the bishops joined the Old Believers movement after the schism of 1666-67 in the Russian Orthodox Church, except bishop Paul of Kolomna, who was executed, ordained priests of the old rite would have soon become extinct. Two responses appeared to this dilemma: the “priestist” Old Believers (поповцы (Popovtsy) and the non-priestist Old Believers (беспоповцы (Bespopovtsy).

The Beglopopovtsy movement formed in the late 17th century and included priests, who had "deserted" the Russian Orthodox Church (hence, the name "beglopopovtsy", meaning "with deserted priests"). They settled in the Nizhny Novgorod region beyond the Volga River (along the Kerzhenets and Belbash Rivers), around Starodub, Chernigov (modern Chernihiv, Ukraine), and on the Vetka Island (see Vetkovskoye soglasie). In the second half of the 18th century, the Beglopopovtsy formed a group at the Rogozhskoye cemetery in Moscow.

At the beginning, all priestist Old Believers were beglopopovtsy. They represented the more moderate conservative opposition, who strove to continue religious and church life as it had existed before the reforms of Nikon. They recognized ordained priests from the new style Russian Orthodox church who joined the Old Believers and who had denounced the Nikonian reforms. In 1846 the priestist Old Believers convinced Amvrosii (Popovich, 1791-1863) deposed Greek Orthodox bishop (who had been removed under Turkish pressure) to become an Old Believer and to consecrate three Russian Old Believers priests as bishops. In 1859, the number of Old Believer bishops in Russia reached ten, and they established their own episcopate, the so-called Belokrinitskaya hierarchy.

Not all priestist Old Believers recognized this new established hierarchy, which provoked a schism within the priestist Old Believers. For various reasons many could not accept this so-called Belokrinitskaya Hierarchy. From this time priestist Old Believers became divided into two groups: those who accepted the Belokrinitskaya Hierarchy and those who did not. These dissenters were called beglopopovtsy and obtained their own hierarchy only in the 1920s, the so-called Novozybkovskaya Hierarchy or Russian Old-Orthodox Church. From that moment the denomination beglopopovtsy no longer existed and the term became rarely used.
