= Russian Church =

Russian Church may refer to:

== Russian Orthodox ==
=== Denominations ===
- Russian Orthodox Church, alternatively legally known as the Moscow Patriarchate, one of the autocephalous Eastern Orthodox churches, in full communion with other Eastern Orthodox patriarchates. Main church in Russia headed by Patriarch Kirill of Moscow and all Rus'
  - Russian Orthodox Church Outside Russia, also called the Russian Orthodox Church Abroad, ROCA, or ROCOR, is a semi-autonomous part of the Russian Orthodox Church.
- Belokrinitskaya Hierarchy, first full and stable church hierarchy created through the Raskol by the Old Believers. The hierarchy was created in 1846 with presently two separate Russian Church lines:
  - Russian Orthodox Old-Rite Church or Russian Orthodox Oldritualist Church, Eastern Orthodox Church of the Old Believers tradition, which rejected the liturgical and canonical reforms of Patriarch Nikon in the second half of 17th century (Old Believers). Since the 18th century until the Council of 1988, the official self-designation of this Church was the Old Orthodox Church of Christ.
  - Russian Old-Orthodox Church, Eastern Orthodox Church of the Old Believers tradition, born of a schism within the Russian Orthodox Church during the 17th century (Old Believers). The current head of the Church is Patriarch Alexander Kalinin.
- True Orthodoxy or Genuine Orthodoxy, movement within Orthodox Christianity that separated from the mainstream Eastern Orthodox Church over issues of ecumenism and Calendar reform since the 1920s. The Russian churches in True Orthodoxy include:
  - Russian Orthodox Autonomous Church (ROAC or in Latin characters RPAC), with synod is located in Suzdal, Russia.
  - Russian True Orthodox Church (Josephites), commonly known as the Catacomb Church

=== Buildings ===
- Russian Church (Florence), Italy
- Bucharest Russian Church, Romania
- Russian Church, Qazvin, Iran

== Russian Catholic ==
- Catholic Church in Russia, incorporating all communities and institutions of the Catholic Church in Russia
  - Russian Greek Catholic Church, also called Russian Byzantine Catholic Church, a Byzantine Rite catholic church sui juris in full union with the Roman Catholic Church.

== Russian Protestant ==
- Protestantism in Russia, various denominations, Evangelical Christians, Baptists (which are the most numerous), Pentecostals/Charismatics, Adventists, Lutherans, Presbyterians and Anglicans.

== See also ==
- Ukrainian Orthodox Church (Moscow Patriarchate), a self-governing church of the Russian Orthodox Church in Ukraine
