= Intercession Cathedral, Rostov-on-Don =

Coordinates: 47.2166°N 39.7171°E

Old Believers Pokrovsky Cathedral
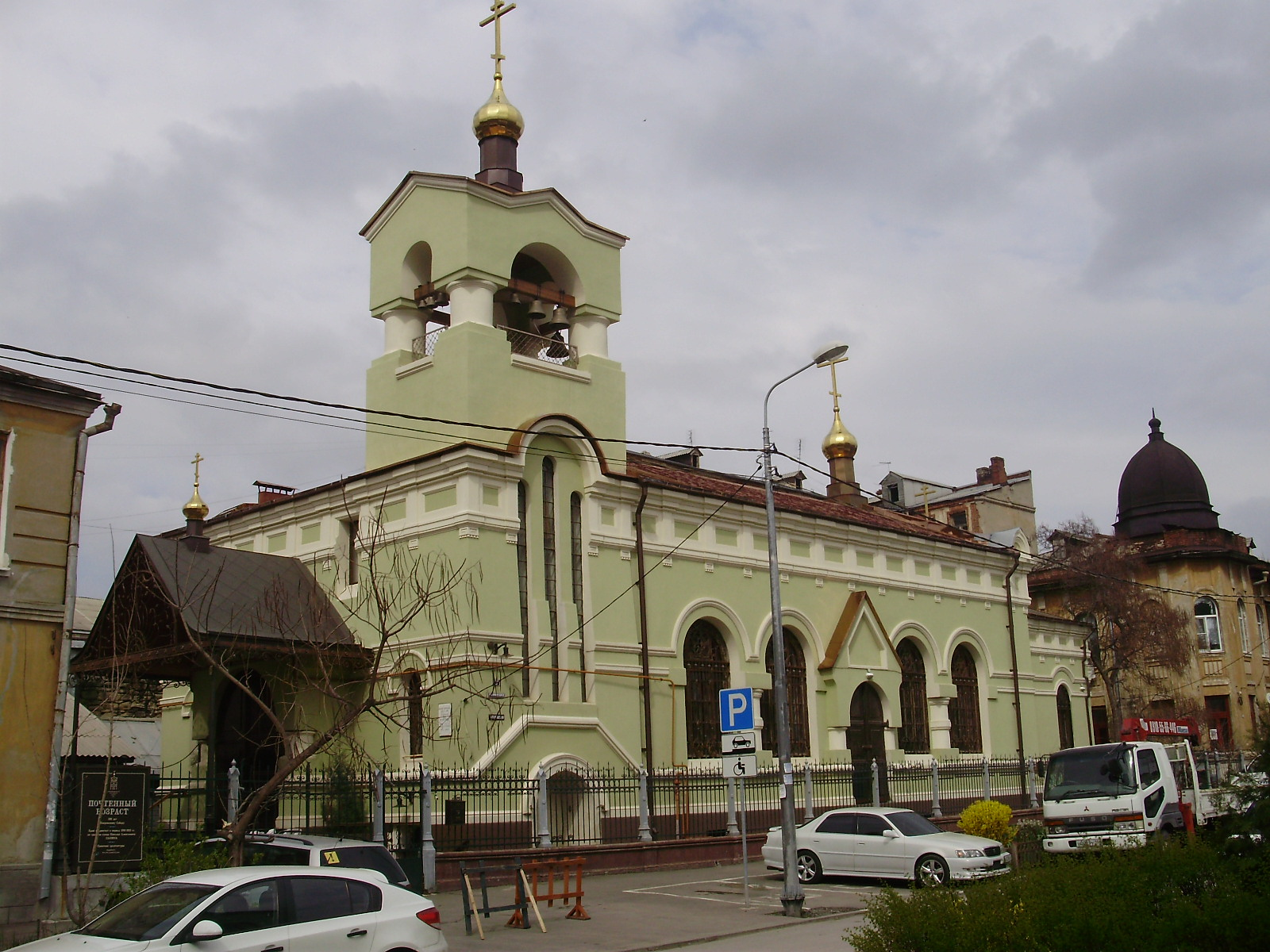
- The beginning of the 20th century

Religion
- Affiliation: Russian Orthodox Old-Rite Church

Location
- Location: Rostov-on-Don, Russia
- Interactive map of Old Believers Pokrovsky Cathedral

Architecture
- Architect: Vladimir Pokrovsky
- Style: Russian Revival
- Completed: 1913

Intercession Cathedral (Russian: Покровский собор) is a cathedral of the Don and Caucasian Diocese of the Russian Orthodox Old-Rite Church, located in Rostov-on-Don (Ulyanovskaya Street, 37). It was built in 1913 on the project of architect Vladimir Pokrovsky. The cathedral has the status of an object of cultural heritage of regional significance.

== History ==
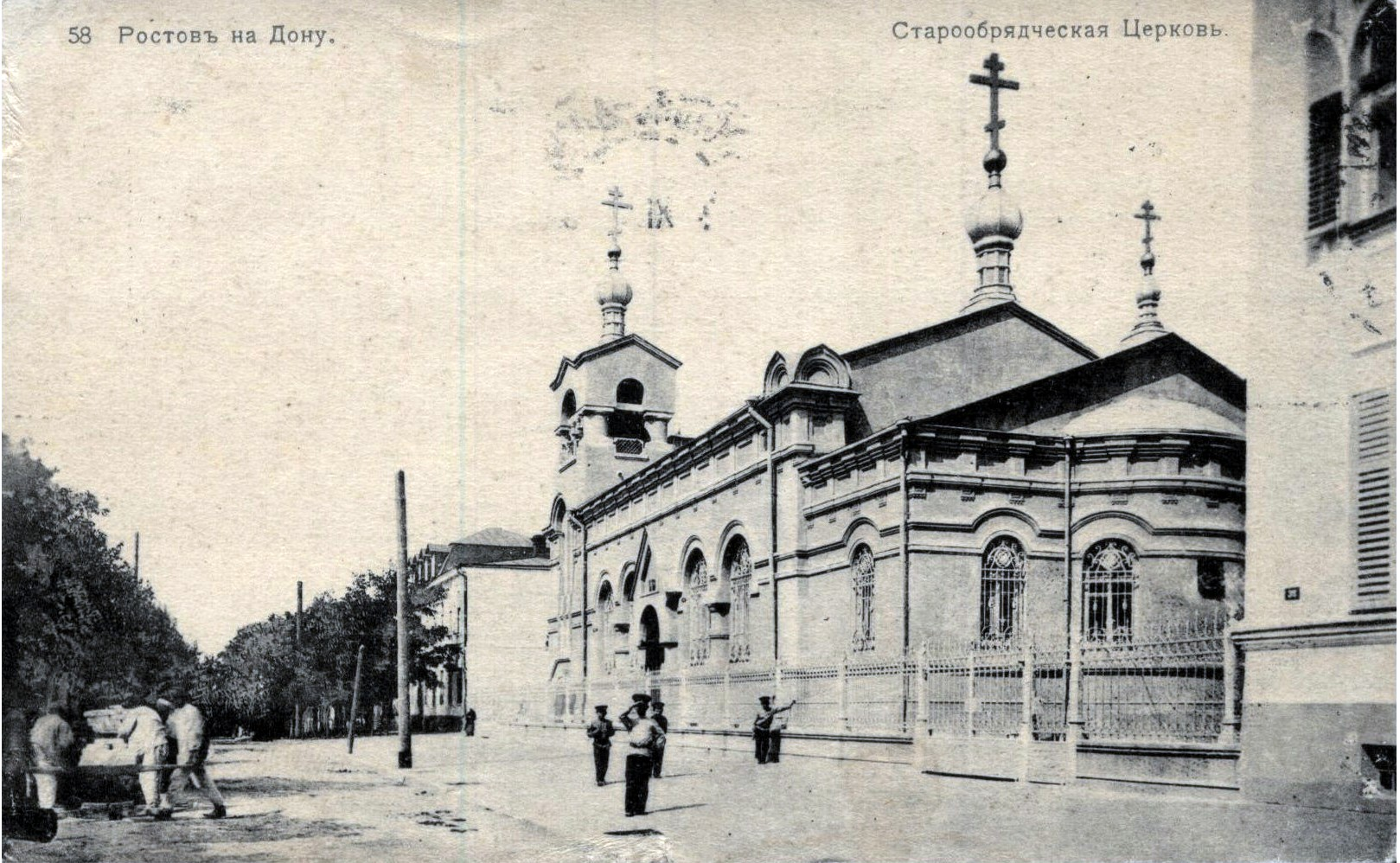

One of the first places of worship for Old Believers community of Rostov-on-Don was a small chapel. In 1813 a wooden Church of the Intercession was built on the site of the chapel. In 1913 a stone church of the Intercession of the Holy Virgin was built on the opposite side of the street where the wooden church was situated.

Opposite the church apse there was located Old Believers hospice (according to other sources, it actually was the clergy house), built in 1910 also on the funds of Panin. In church was established an altar of St. Elijah the Prophet, so the temple also sometimes called "Pokrov―St. Elijah Church".

The proximity of the two Old Believers Pokrovsky temple was explained by the presence of multiple branches of Russian Old Believers. According to the memoirs of the members of congregation, stone Church of the Intercession was originally owned by the Beglopopovtsy of Russian Old-Orthodox Church. And to the community of Russian Orthodox Old-Rite Church belonged the old wooden church. In 1923, the wooden church was closed, and its congregation moved into the stone Pokrovsky temple. In 1930 this temple was closed, too, and its building was used to house a radio workshop. In 1946 it was re-opened, but was given to Russian Orthodox Old-Rite Church community.

== Architecture ==
Old Believers Pokrovsky Cathedral was built in Russian Revival style. The architect had to solve the problem of construction of the temple in a small area surrounded by urban development. This fact explains its unusual architecture.

To extended dining room adjoins the semicircular apse, asymmetrically located one-tier belfry and porch. Belfry, refectory and the apse are crowned by small cupolas with crosses. Semicircular window openings of the refectory are decorated with decorative plaster. The temple is designed to hold about 500 worshipers.

== Gallery ==
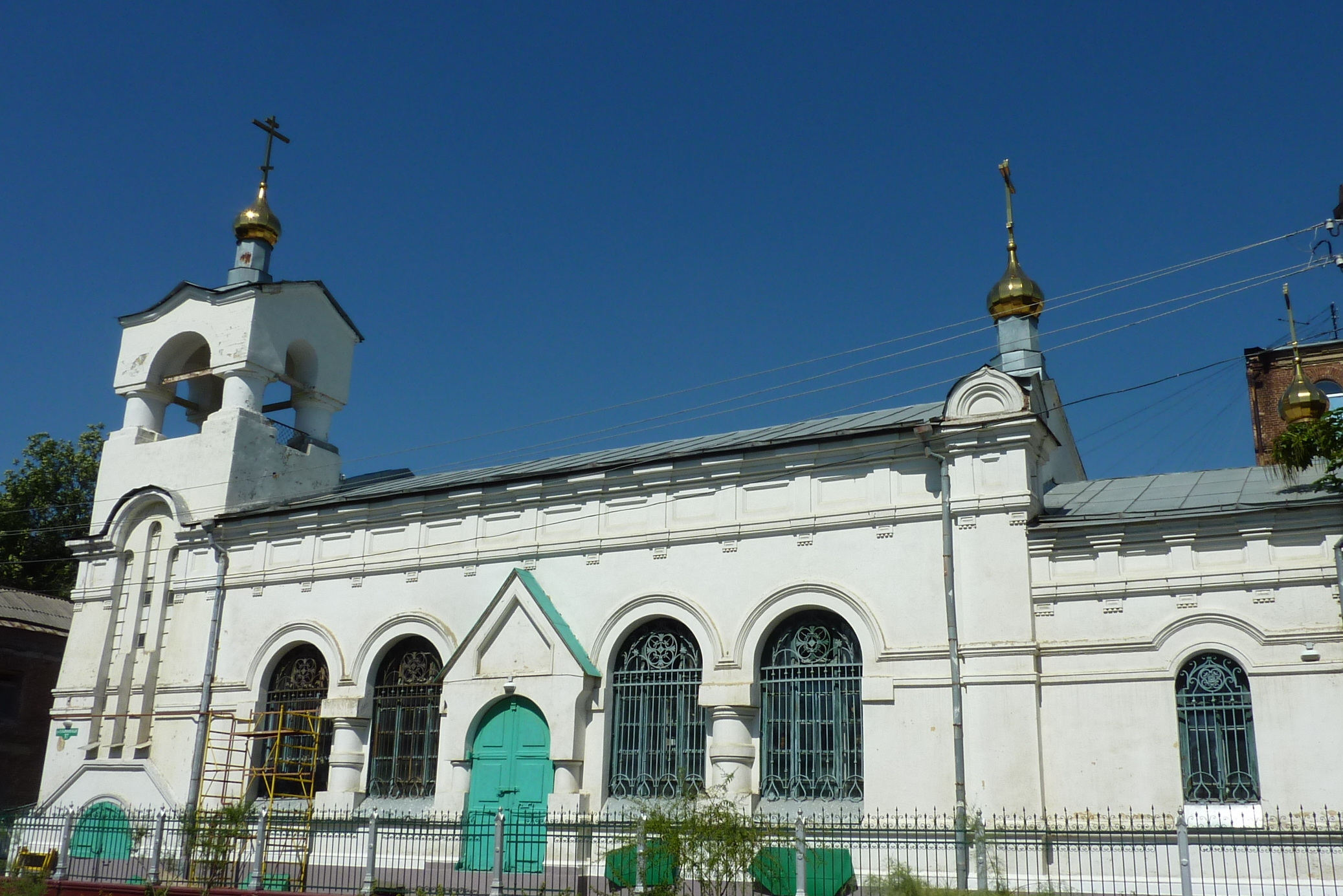

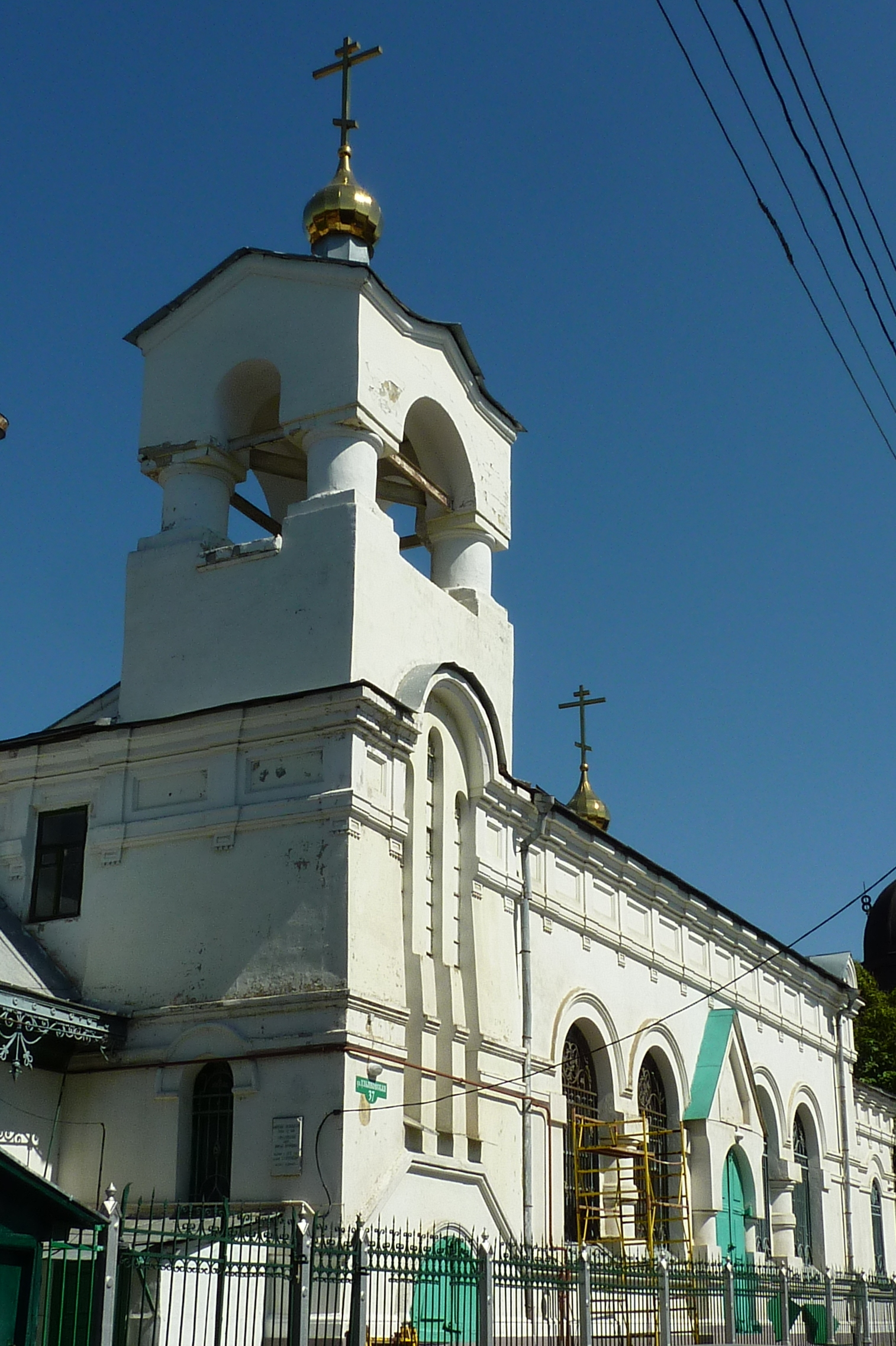

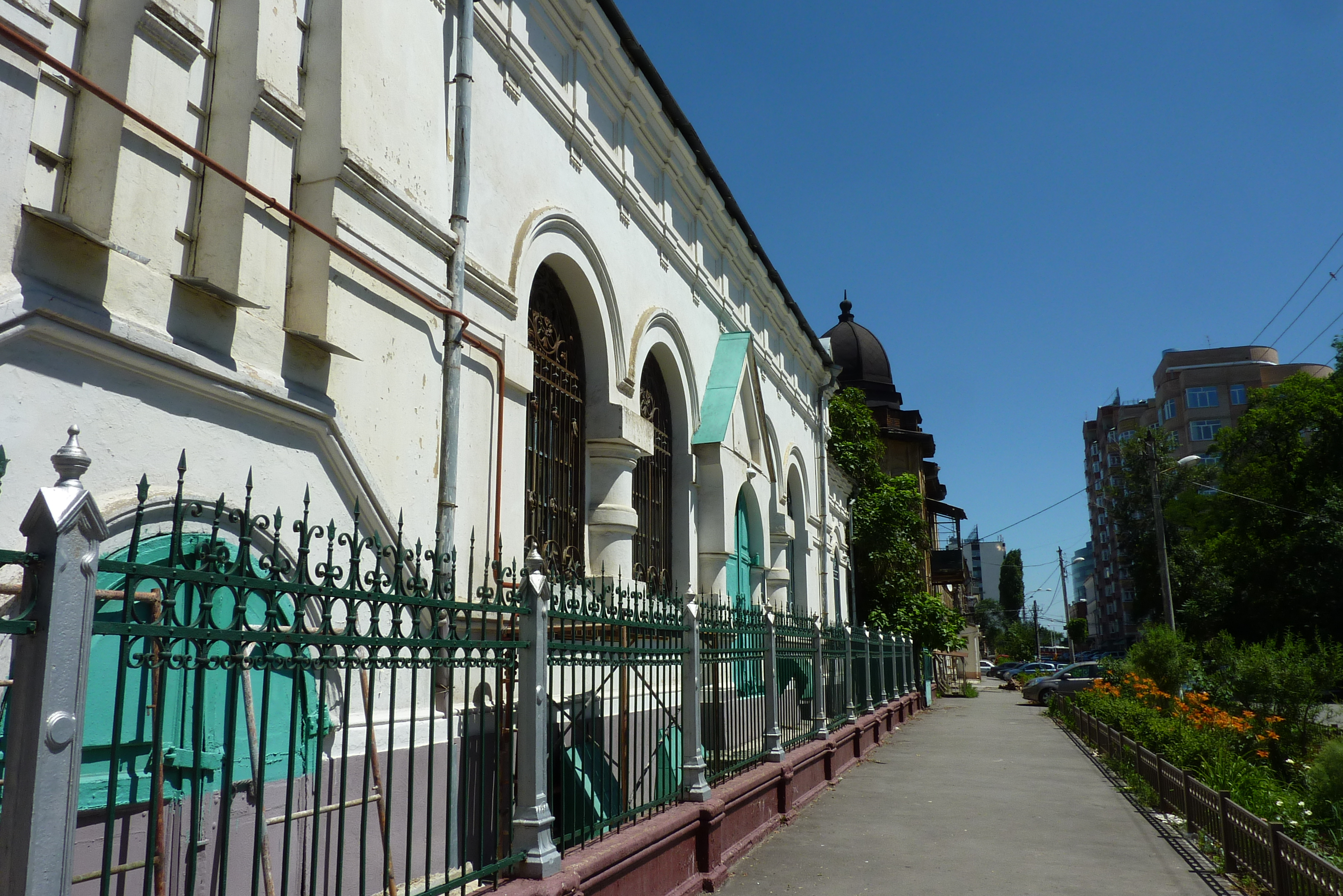
