= Popovtsy =

Christian group in Russia

The Popovtsy (Russian: поповцы, IPA: [pɐˈpoftsɨ], lit. 'priested ones') or Popovschina (Russian: поповщина) are a Christian group in Russia that originated in the 17th century. They were one of the two main factions of Old Believers, the other being the Bezpopovtsy ('priestless ones').

== Historical background ==
After the reforms of Patriarch Nikon of Moscow in the 1650s, many members of the Russian Orthodox Church refused to acknowledge the changes that he had made to bring the church in line with the Greek Orthodox Church.

As none of the bishops joined the Old Believers (except Bishop Paul of Kolomna, who was executed), ordained priests of the Old Rite would have soon become extinct. Two responses appeared to this dilemma: the priested Old Believers (поповцы, Popovtsy). and the priestless Old Believers (беспоповцы, Bezpopovtsy). As opposed to the Bezpopovtsy, the Popovtsy recognised the validity of the priesthood of clergy ordained by the state church, receiving them into their fold, and creating their own ecclesiastical structure, which would later split into a number of smaller movements (such as those who accepted the priesthood of the Belokrinitskaya Hierarchy, the so-called Beglopopovtsy who rejected the hierarchy, and the Belovodskaya Hierarchy).

The Popovtsy represented the more moderate conservative opposition and strove to continue religious and church life as it had existed before Nikon's reforms. They recognised ordained priests from the new-style Russian Orthodox Church who joined the Old Believers and who had denounced the reforms. The Popovtsy have priests, bishops and all of the sacraments including the Eucharist.

== Spiritual centres of the Popovtsy ==
In the 18th and the 19th centuries, the Popovtsy lived in communities on Vetka Island, on the Sozh River' in Starodub, along the Irgiz River; and in monasteries in Nizhny Novgorod Province, along the Kerzhenets River. Howerver, they were scattered throughout Russia and even far beyond its borders. From the late 18th to the early 19th centuries, their spiritual centre was located in Moscow, at Rogozhskoye Cemetery.

== Edinovertsy ==
Around 1800, a group of Popovtsy, mainly merchants from Moscow seeking the abrogation of discriminating legislation, which obstructed their commercial activities, offered to acknowledge the leadership of the Synod of the Russian Orthodox Church if they would be allowed to use the old books and rites. They came to be known as Edinovertsy and are generally not regarded not as Old Believers, but rather Old Ritualists.

== Belokrinitskaya hierarchy ==
In 1846, the Popovtsy convinced Metropolitan Ambrose (Amvrosii Popovich, 1791-1863), a deposed Greek Orthodox bishop of Bosnia, who had been removed under Turkish pressure), to become an Old Believer and to consecrate three Russian Old Believer priests as bishops. In 1859, the number of Old Believer bishops in Russia had reached ten, and they established their own episcopate, the so-called Belokrinitskaya Hierarchy.

== Beglopopovsty; Novozybkovskaya Hierarchy ==
Not all priested Old Believers recognised the hierarchy. The dissenters were called беглопоповцы (beglopopovtsy) and obtained their own hierarchy in the 1920s. The priested Old Believers are thus represented by two churches that have the same beliefs but treat each other's hierarchies as illegitimate. It is now known as the Russian Old-Orthodox Church.

== Modern situation ==
The Popovtsy were hostile towards the 1917 October Revolution. For some time (in the early 1920s), the new Soviet regime was rather tolerant towards the Old Believers as a whole, but in the 1930s, the Old Believers too were subjected to severe repressions. Most of their churches were confiscated or demolished. During the Soviet period, the social strata that had been traditionally the backbone of the Old Believer population (peasants, Cossacks, craftsmen, artisans, merchants and entrepreneurs) were practically extinguished. The Old Believers' churches are now restored and recognised by the state.

== Hierarchies ==
The two churches of the Popovtsy are:

- Belokrinitskaya Hierarchy, also known as Belokrinitskoe Soglasie, and officially called Russian Orthodox Old-Rite Church, has its centre situated at the Rogozhskoe Cemetery, in Moscow. It is the largest Popovtsy church in modern Russia. In the 19th century, the Belokrinitskaya Hierarchy was subject to the schism of Encyclicalsts and the Nonecyclicalsts.
- Novozybkovskaya Hierarchy, officially known as the Russian Old-Orthodox Church, former beglopopovtsy.

== United States ==
In the 21st century, over 7,000 Old Believers live in the United States, including members of the Popovtsy, with settlements in Oregon and Alaska.
