= Bespopovtsy =

Priestless Old Believers that reject Nikonite priests

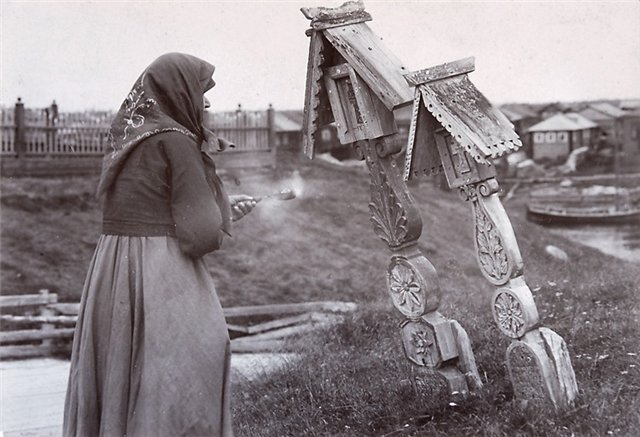
Old Believers in Russian North. Late 19th - early 20th century

Bespopovtsy (Russian: беспоповцы, IPA: [bʲɪspɐˈpoftsɨ], lit. 'priestless ones'), often called Priestless Old Believers in English, are one of the two major groups of Old Believers. Unlike the Popovtsy ('priested' ones), the Bespopovtsy reject priests ordained after the liturgical reforms of Patriarch Nikon of Moscow in the 17th century.

== Historical background ==
After the reforms of Patriarch Nikon of Moscow in the 1650s, many members of the Russian Orthodox Church refused to acknowledge the changes that he had made to bring the church in line with the Greek Orthodox Church.

== Modern beliefs ==
Priestless Old Believers may have evolved into the first Spiritual Christians, who were divided into various and diverse tribal sects including the Pomortsy, Fedoseyans, Filippians, Chasovennye, Wanderers, and the Saviour's Confession (Spasovo soglasie/Netovshchina).

Some reject priests and a number of church rites, such as the Eucharist and believe that any priest or hierarch who has used the Nikonite Rites has forfeited apostolic succession. Others still believe in the existence of a priesthood, but happen to find themselves without priests. Many such sects have historically received Nikonite priests that have publicly repented from Nikon's reforms.

== United States ==
In the 21st century, over 7,000 Old Believers live in the United States, with settlements in Oregon and Alaska.

== Sources ==
- Crummey, Robert O. The Old Believers & The World Of Antichrist; The Vyg Community & The Russian State, Wisconsin U.P., 1970.
- Zenkovsky, Serge A. "The ideology of the Denisov brothers", Harvard Slavic Studies, 1957. III, 49–66.
- Нильский, И. (1869a). Семейная жизнь в русском расколе. Вып. 1: От начала раскола до царствования императора Николая I (in Russian). СПб.
- Нильский, И. (1869b). Семейная жизнь в русском расколе. Вып. 2: Царствование императора Николая I (in Russian). СПб.
- Василенко Н. П. (1890–1907). "Раскол". Brockhaus and Efron Encyclopedic Dictionary: In 86 Volumes (82 Volumes and 4 Additional Volumes) (in Russian). St. Petersburg: F. A. Brockhaus.
- Казьмина О. Е. (1999). "Беспоповцы" (PDF). Народы и религии мира: Энциклопедия (100000 экз ed.). М.: Большая Российская энциклопедия. pp. 692–693. ISBN 5-85270-155-6.
- Миловидов В. Ф. (2002). "Беспоповщина". Религии народов современной России: Словарь (2-е изд., испр. и доп 4000 экз ed.). М.: Республика. pp. 45–46. ISBN 5-250-01818-1.
- Попов С. Н. (2007). "Типология (классификация) христианских церквей. (Русские староверы – старообрядцы или реформаторы?)" (сб. ст) (2) (Теология и религиоведение ed.). Барнаул: Изд-во Алт. ун-та.

== See also ==
- Popovtsy, another major strain of Old Believers, the ones who accept priests.
- Belokrinitskaya Hierarchy
- Edinoverie Old-Ritualists
- Russian Old-Orthodox Church
