= Lipovan Orthodox Old-Rite Church =

Romanian church

Orthodox Old-Rite Church
- Biserica Ortodoxă de Rit Vechi
- Type: Eastern Christianity
- Classification: Old Believers
- Orientation: Russian Orthodoxy
- Scripture: Septuagint, New Testament
- Theology: Eastern Orthodox theology
- Polity: Episcopal
- Metropolitan bishop: Leontius Izot
- Language: Church Slavonic
- Liturgy: A variation of the Byzantine Rite
- Headquarters: Fântâna Albă (1846-1940), Brăila (since 1940)
- Territory: claim to lead the Old Believers all over the world, except Russia, Ukraine, Belarus and Central Asia
- Origin: 1846
- Separated from: Russian Orthodox Church
- Members: 28,280 (2022)
- Places of worship: 67

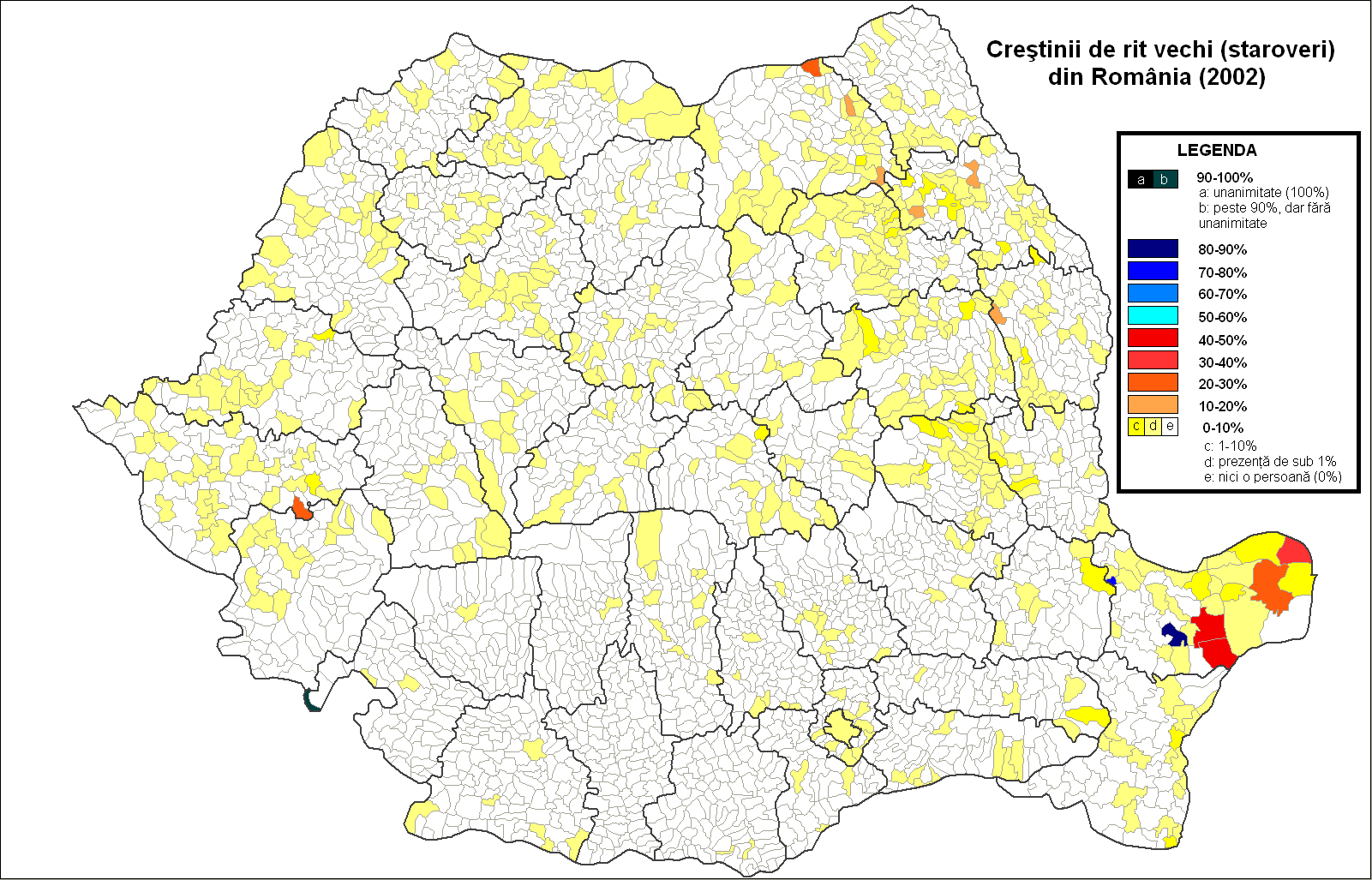
Old Believers in Romania (2002 census)

The Lipovan Orthodox Old-Rite Church (or Orthodox Old-ritualist Church, Orthodox Old-Rite Church, Romanian: Biserica Ortodoxă de Rit Vechi din România; Russian: Православная старообрядческая Церковь в Румынии) is the Romanian Old Believer jurisdiction of the Belokrinitskaya Hierarchy.

The head of the Church carries the title of Archbishop of Belaya Krinitsa and Bucharest and Metropolitan of all Orthodox Christians of the Old Rite everywhere (Russian: Архиепископ Белой Криницы и Бухареста и митрополит всех православных христиан старого обряда повсюду). His see is nominally in Bila Krynytsia/Belaya Krinitsa/Fântâna Albă (Bukovina), his residence in Brăila, Romania since 1940.

It positions itself as the world center of popovtsy, as the "Mother Church" for the Russian Orthodox Old-Rite Church; the latter does not recognize this.

== History ==
Lipovans are Russian Old Believers who fled Russia in the late 17th and early 18th centuries, in order to escape the persecution of their faith.

== Eparchies ==
There are seven eparchies of the Lipovan Orthodox Old-Rite Church:

- Eparchy of Fântâna Albă, with residence in Brăila, which includes the old rite orthodox parishes from Brăila and Galați counties, Bucharest, Borduşani (Ialomiţa county), Fântâna Albă/Bila Krynytsia (Ukraine);
- Eparchy of Slava, with residence in Slava Rusă (Tulcea county), which includes the parishes from Slava Rusă, Slava Cercheză, Carcaliu, Ghindăreşti, Jurilovca, 2 Mai, Constanţa, Cernavodă and Năvodari in Constanţa county, and parishes from Bulgaria;
- Eparchy of Bukovina and Moldavia, with residence in Târgu Frumos (Iași County), which includes the parishes from Iași, Vaslui, Neamţ, Suceava and Botoșani counties;
- Eparchy of Tulcea, with residence in Tulcea, which includes the parishes from Tulcea, Sulina, Mahmudia, Sarichioi, Periprava, Chilia Veche, Mila 23, Sfiştovca;
- Eparchy of the US, residing in Oregon, which includes the parishes from the U.S., Canada, and Australia;
- Western Eparchy, based in Turin (Italy), which includes the parishes from Italy, Spain, Portugal, France, Germany, Austria, and Hungary;
- Eparchy of the Baltic States, residing in Jēkabpils, comprising the parishes from Estonia, Latvia, and Lithuania.

== First Hierarchs ==
In Hungary and Romania (Belaya Krinitsa, temporarily in Brăila, Romania)

| Name Title | Portrait | Period | | Notes |
|---|---|---|---|---|
| Ambrose (Papageorgopolos); Metropolitan of Belaya Krinitza | | 28 October 1846 | 26 July 1848 | Died on 30 October 1863 |
| Cyril (Timofeyev); Archbishop of Belaja Krinitza and Metropolitan of All Old-Rite Orthodox Christians | | 4 January 1849 | 2 December 1873 | |
| Athanasius (Makurov) | | 9 May 1874 | 1 October 1905 | |
| Macarius (Lobov) | | 10 September 1906 | 2 January 1921 | |
| Nicodemus (Fedotov) | | 24 September 1924 | 15 October 1926 | |
| Paphnutius (Fedoseyev) | | 8 June 1928 | 8 April 1939 | |
| Silouan (Kravtsov) | | 25 June 1939 | 5 January 1941 | The last metropolitan, who resided in Belaya Krinitsa. 22 July 1940 he transferred his headquarter to Brăila |
| Innocent (Usov) | | 10 May 1941 | 16 February 1942 | |
| Tikhon (Kachalkin); Metropolitan of Belaya Krinitza | | 12 April 1942 | 4 March 1968 | |
| Joasaph (Timofey) | | 15 December 1968 | 16 February 1985 | |
| Timon (Gavrilov) | | 1 June 1985 | 21 August 1996 | |
| Leontius (Izot) | | 24 October 1996 | Incumbent | |
