= Rogozhskoye Cemetery =

Russian Orthodox Old-Rite Church community center and cemetery

- Рогожское кладбище
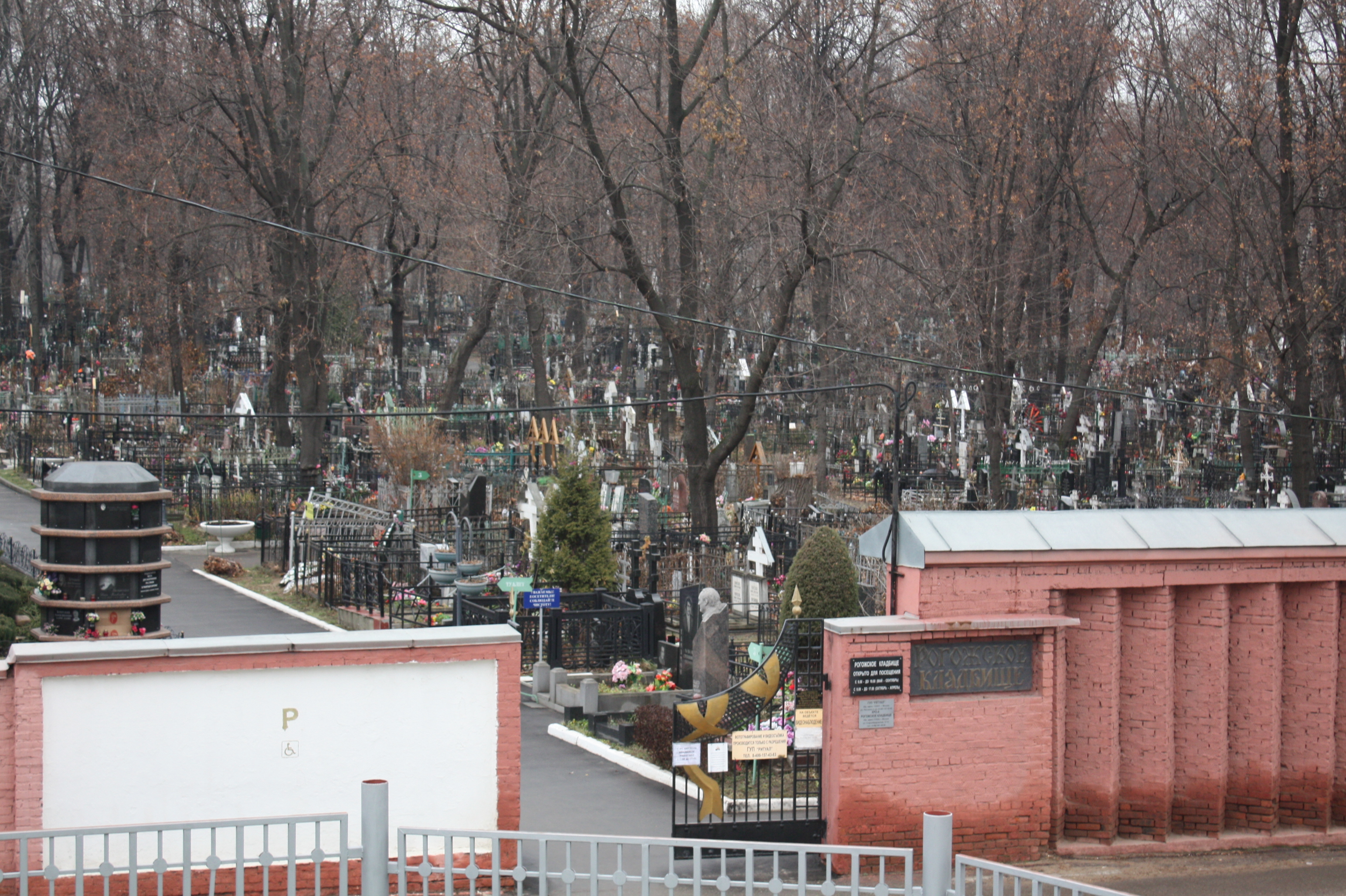
- Interactive map of Rogozhskoye Cemetery

Details
- Established: 1771
- Location: Moscow
- Country: Russia
- Coordinates: 55°44′32″N 37°42′11″E
- Size: 9.65 hectares (23.8 acres)

Rogozhskoe Cemetery (Russian: Рогожское кладбище, romanized: Rogozhskoye kladbishche, IPA: [rɐˈɡoʂskəjɪ ˈkladbʲɪɕːɪ]) in Moscow, Russia, is the spiritual and administrative centre of the largest Old Believers denomination, the Russian Orthodox Old-Rite Church. Historically, the name cemetery was applied to the whole Old Believer community, with living quarters, cathedral, almshouses, libraries, archives, and the Old-Rite Teachers Institute (established in 1907).

The actual 12-hectare cemetery is now a non-denominational municipal burial site. The Old Believers operate a closed spiritual community in the southern part of the historical Rogozhsky Township, and the Russian Orthodox Church operates the Church of Saint Nicholas, located between the cemetery and the Old Believers' territory.

Founded in 1777, the place is much more than just a cemetery. It is an entire small town of the Old Believer community, with its own cathedral, churches and chapels.

The cemetery gave name to a denomination of Old Believers called the Rogozhskoe Hierarchy. The denomination was the first among the popovtsy, who have maintained priests and found a bishop for the Belokrinitskaya Hierarchy.

The name of the Old Believer merchant Rogozhin, who figures in Fyodor Dostoyevsky's novel The Idiot, was also derived from the cemetery.

== History ==
In 1762, the first year of her reign, Catherine II opened Russia to settlers of all confessions, excluding Jews and in particular invited the Old Believer fugitives, whose spiritual centre was then based in present-day Belarus. A group of fugitives that returned to Moscow became the nucleus of future Rogozhskoe community.

Moscow Old Believers operated two cemeteries within the city borders, one near Serpukhov Gates and another on Tverskaya Road. After the devastating plague of 1770–1772 all burials within the city limits were banned; instead, the Crown established new cemeteries well beyond the city limits. The new Old Believers' cemetery was one mile east from city limits, between the roads to Vladimir and Ryazan, south from the village of Novaya Andronovka. Mass graves from the 1771 plague were preserved at Rogozhskoe until the 20th century.

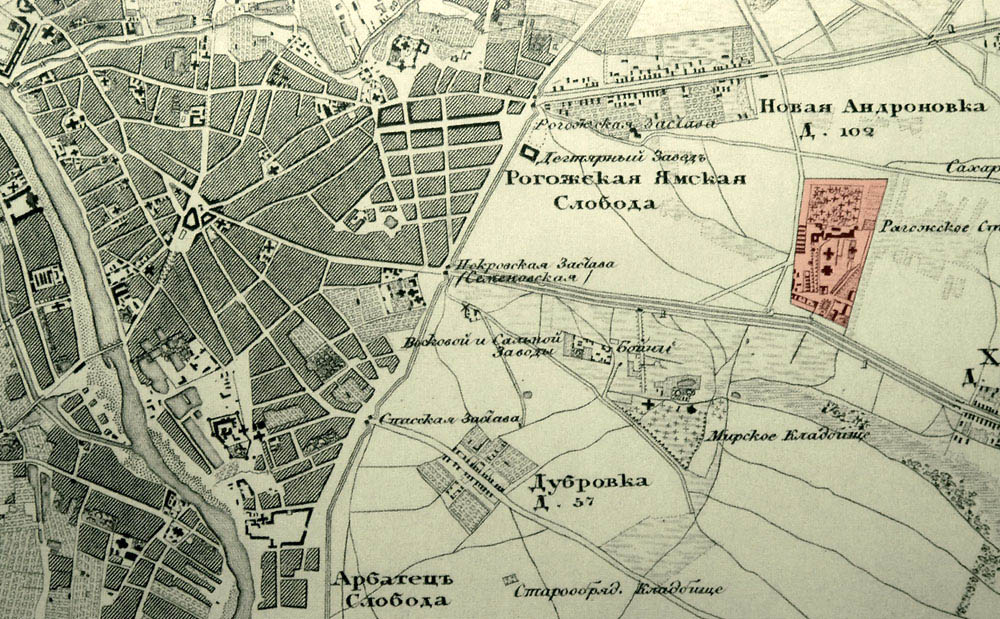
Eastern suburbs of Moscow in 1848. Rogozhskoe Cemetery in red.

In the last quarter of the 18th century, the cemetery became a spiritual centre of popovtsy Old Believers, a denomination that relied on professional ordained clergy, rather than informal spiritual leaders. By the early 19th century, the popovtsy had built three churches, or chapels. The oldest, dedicated to Saint Nicholas, was built in 1776, on the site of present-day Saint Nicholas Church of the Orthodox denomination). By the end of Alexander I's reign, the sloboda around the cemetery had grown into a small town with five convents; informal leadership of the cemetery was vested to Mother Pulcheria (born Pelagea Shevlyukova), and later to her father, Ivan Yastrebov, who gained influence during the September 1812 French invasion of Russia for saving Rogozhskoe treasures from the French troops.

The influence of Rogozhskoe's clergy grew because of the scarcity of Old-Rite clergy in the Russian hinterland. Even the basic Old-Rite services, like weddings and confessions, were available only there. As a result, pilgrimages from elsewhere quickly multiplied the wealth of Rogozhskoe's coffers.

Although the Old Believers were allowed to build new churches, none of them was a true church from the government standpoint. Rather, they were classified as chapels and so could not provide the full range of services expected from a church, including the Holy Liturgy, at least legally. In 1823, Rogozhskoe was hit by the government for the first time, and police searched the community, confiscated the altarpiece donated by Matvey Platov and shut down all churches. They soon reopened on the condition that the Old Believers would no longer have the Holy Liturgy.

Nicholas I of Russia increased the pressure, banning ordination of new Old-Rite priests and relocation of existing Old-Rite priests from town to town. As a result, by the 1850s Rogozhskoe's clergy shrank through natural attrition to only three priests, and the government confiscated the unused Saint Nicholas Church in favour of the more acceptable Edinoverie denomination. The Old Believers of Rogozhskoe reacted by establishing a new spiritual and educational centre beyond the Russian border, in Austria-Hungary and created the Belokrinitskaya Hierarchy.

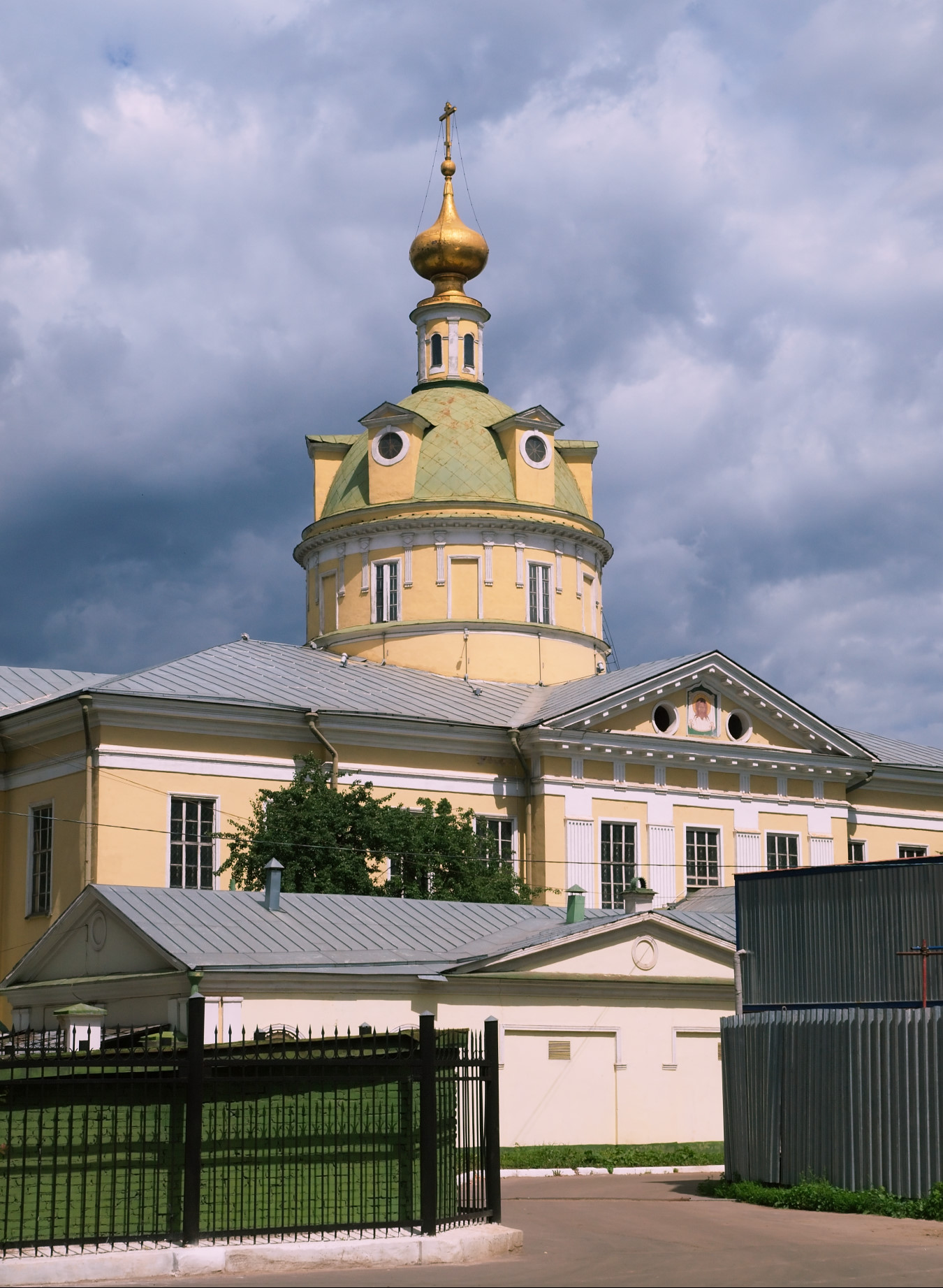
Cathedral of Protection

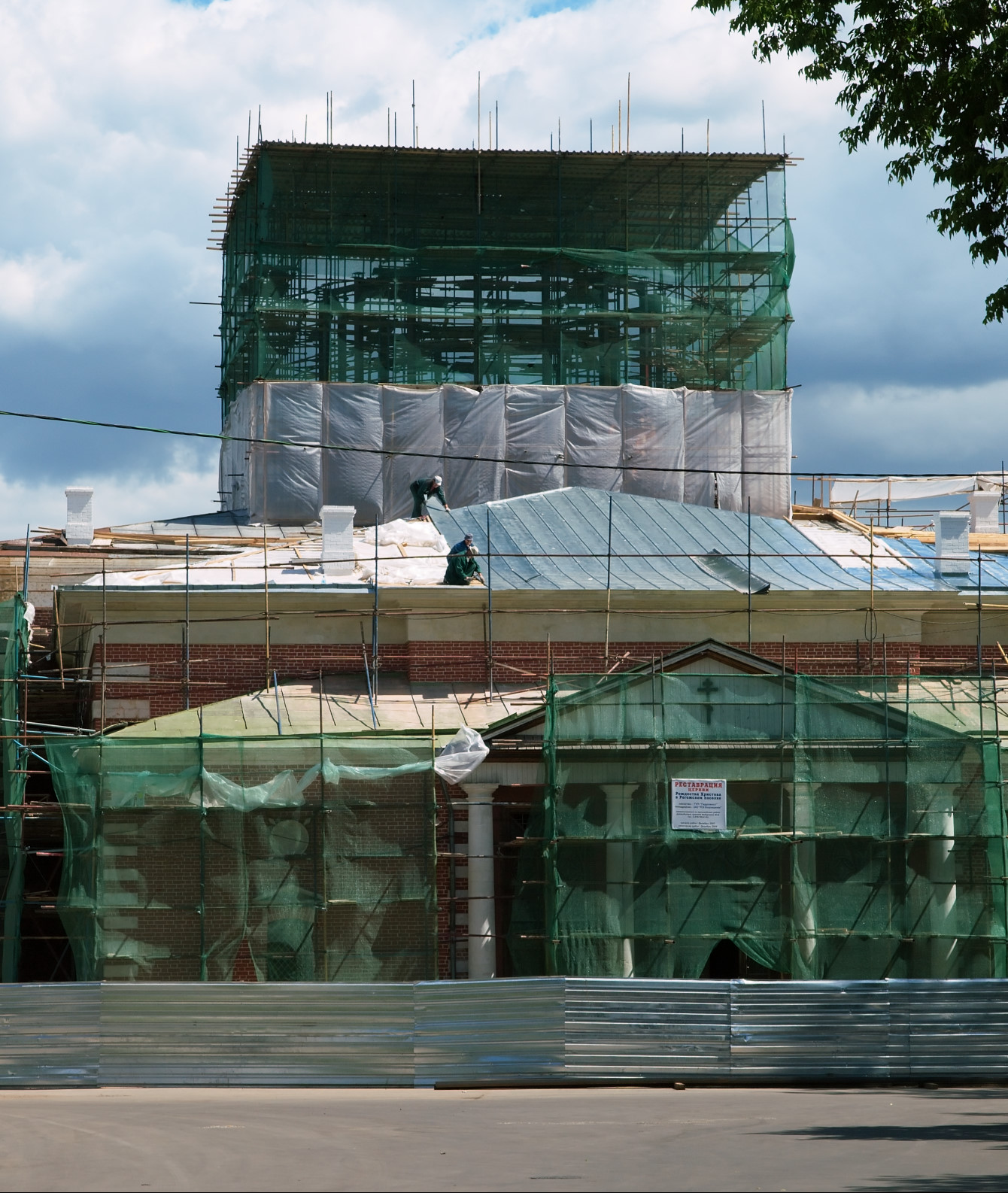
Church of Nativity

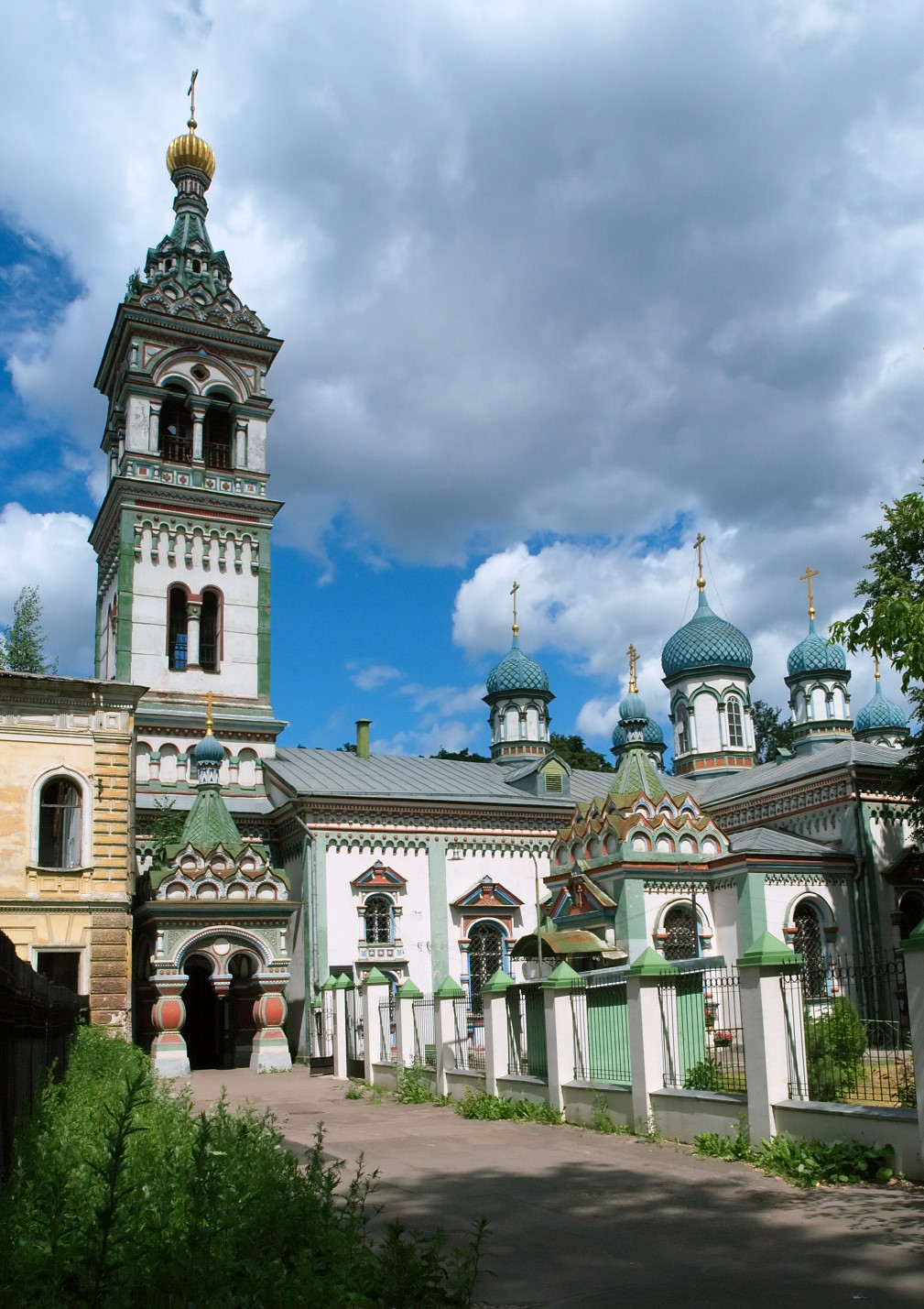
Church of St. Nicholas

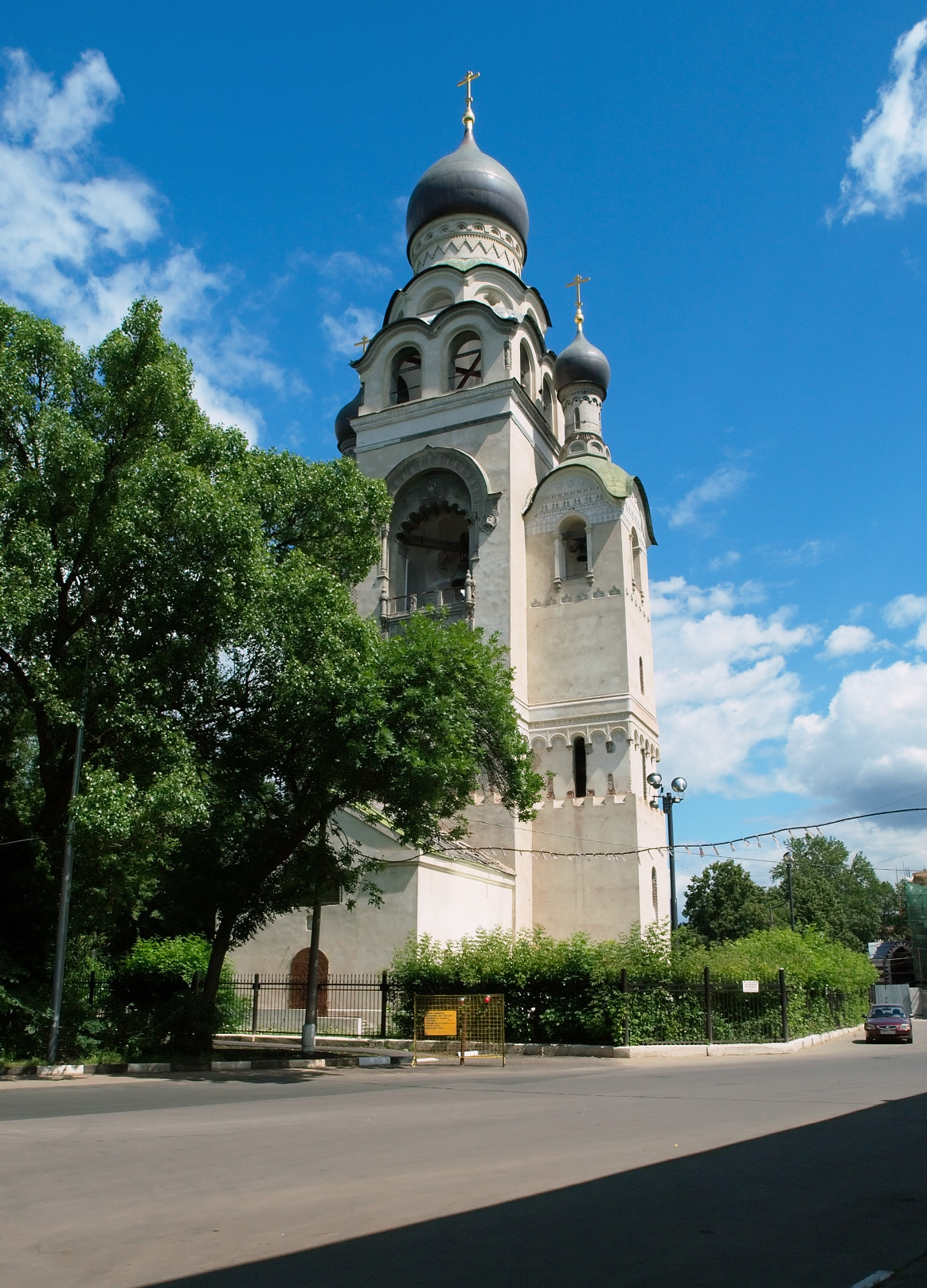
Bell tower

=== Cathedral of Protection ===
In 1791 the community obtained a permit to build the Cathedral of Protection of Our Lady. Architectural drafts (eventually lost) were signed by some Kazakov, which could be either Matvey Kazakov or his lesser-known contemporary Rodion Kazakov. The cathedral, as planned, would have exceeded in size the Dormition Cathedral of the Moscow Kremlin and was intended for use in summer only due to high costs of heating in winter. The builders laid down the foundation even larger than Kazakov's design; worse, they changed the design from a single dome to five domes. In summer 1792, when the walls were nearly complete, Orthodox clergy "uncovered the plot" and alerted Empress Catherine. She was wary of the growing influence of the dissidents and ordered the demolition of the "unlawful" additions. Moscow Governor Prince Alexander Prozorovsky complied and assigned the architect Semyon Karin to supervise demolition.

As a result, the cathedral was built with a single dome resting on an elongated, flat slab with minimalistic neoclassical finishes. Parts of the building are apparently mismatched, which revealed the conflict between the client and the Crown. Traces of baroque influence like the circular windows of the main dome give away its 18th-century roots. The design as built design is attributed, by exclusion, to Karin.

Inside, the cathedral has three aisles and eight load-bearing columns and is decorated in an style that is intended to resemble pre-Nikonian cathedrals. The icons actually date back to the 15th the and 16th centuries, and the neoclassical iconostasis clearly belongs to the 19th century.

=== Church of the Nativity of Christ ===
The Church of the Nativity of Christ, commissioned in 1804, was intended to complement the summer cathedral in the winter. It was designed most likely by Ivan Zhukov. In line with early-19th-century fashion, the design mixes neoclassical layout with details from the Gothic Revival, which are most visible on the northern and the southern façades (the western façade, open to the outside world, carries only a neoclassical portico). Just like the cathedral, the Church of the Nativity is a three-aisle slab with a single dome, but its transepts are more pronounced. The church was insignificantly expanded in 1908–1909, with secondary altars installed in the transept niches and more Gothic features added.

During the Soviet period, the dome was torn down. It has been under recpnstruction since 2007.

=== Church of Saint Nicholas ===
The first chapel of the community, Saint Nicholas was separated from it in 1854, when the government pressed popovtsy out and granted the church building to the Edinoverie, a less independent Old Believer denomination in communion with the state Orthodox Church. The existing Church of Saint Nicholas, financed by personal funds of M. P. Alabin, was designed by Vasily Karneev and built in two stages, 1863–1867 and 1879. This church is of a single-aisle type (without internal columns) and ornately imitates late-17th-century Moscow baroque. The present-day Church of Saint Nicholas belongs to mainline Russian Orthodox Church since the Edinoverie practically disintegrated in the 20th century.

=== Bell tower ===
The tallest and most visible building of the cemetery, a free-standing bell tower was built in 1908 to 1909, soon after the government lifted its prior ban on Old Believer church construction. The bell tower is exactly one metre shorter than Moscow's tallest religious building, Ivan the Great Bell Tower. It was designed by Fyodor Gornostaev (artistic design) and Zinovy Ivanov (structural engineering and construction management). Minor work on internal and external finishes continued until 1913. The first floor housed a small Church of Resurrection, the upper floors, a library and a sacristy. The bells, all internal finishes, and parts of external ornaments were lost during the Soviet period and are being rebuilt.

=== Old-Rite Teachers Institute ===
The Old-Rite Teachers Institute, like the bell tower, emerged in 1912 after the ban on Old Believers was lifted. Initially it operated on Nikoloyamskaya Street, managed by Alexander Rybakov, the father of Boris Rybakov. In 1914 to 1915, the community erected a new institute (wo blocks east from the cathedral. It was closed after the 1917 Russian Revolution and eventually converted to a municipal school.

The cemetery also retains a number of old two-floor buildings. Some are operating, but some are dilapidated and are expecting a complete rebuild (like the Cemetery Hotel, adjacent to Saint Nicholas).

== Notable graves ==
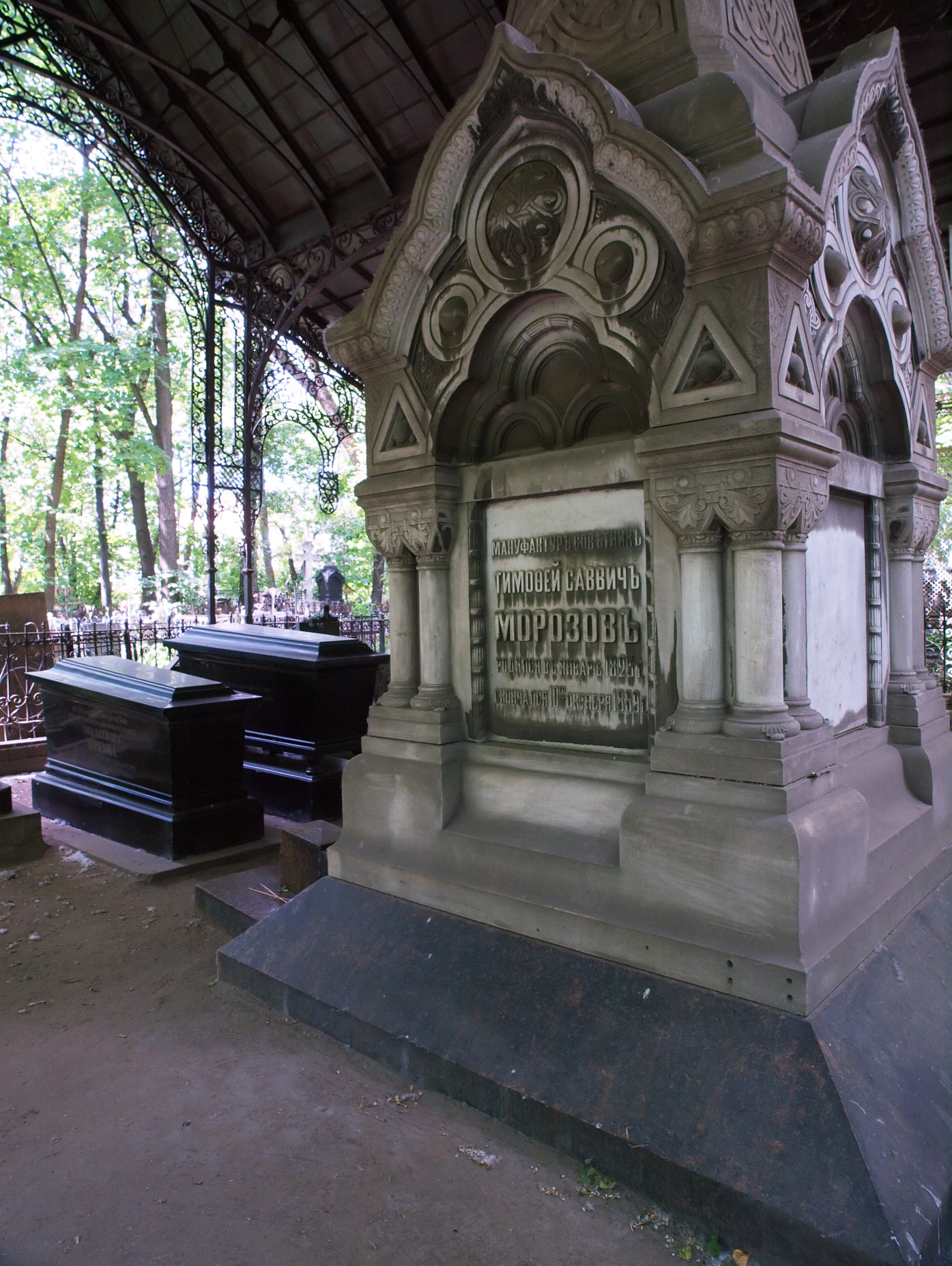
Tomb of Timofei Savvich Morozov amongst other memorials to the Morozov family

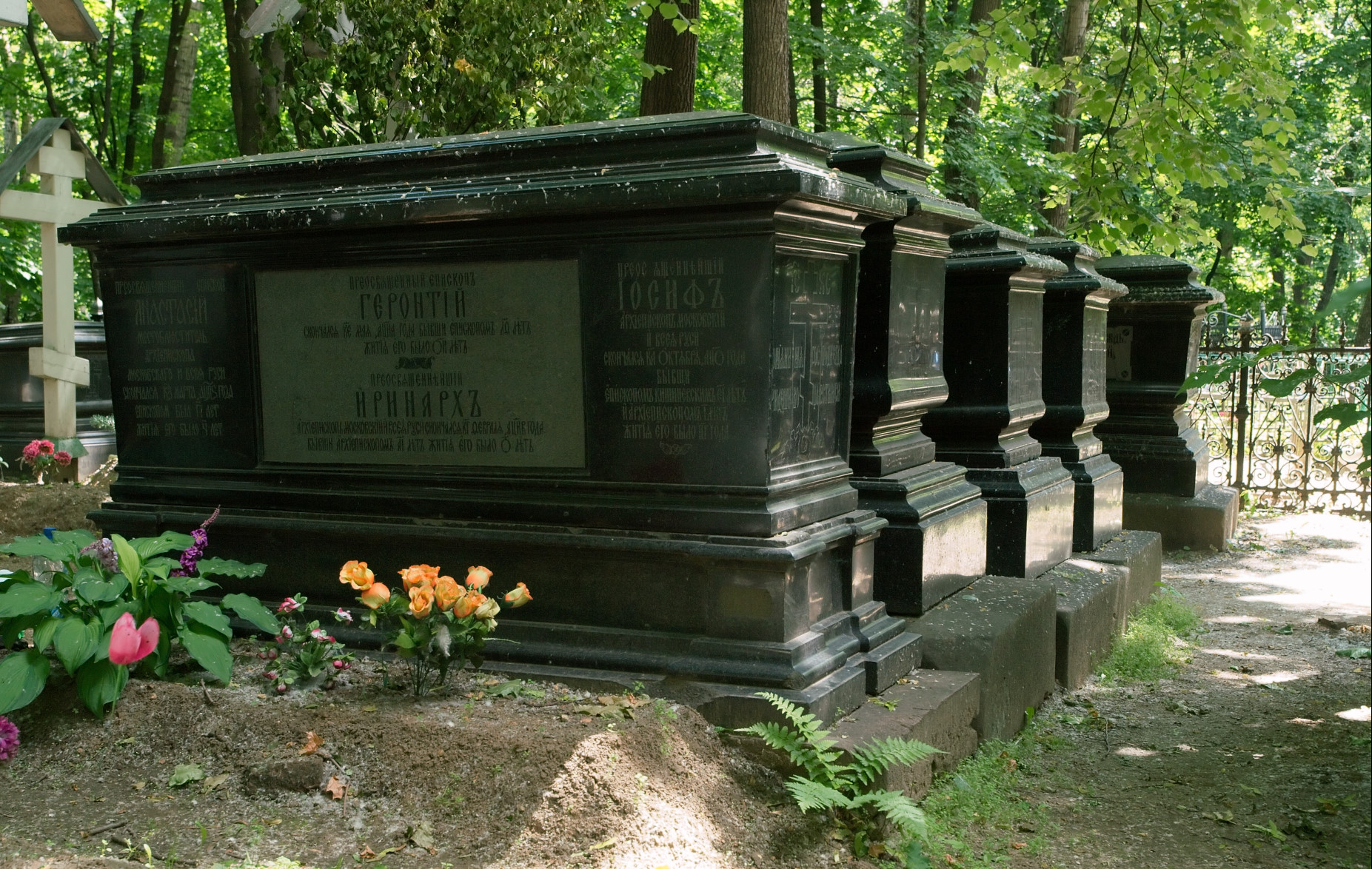
Old Believer clergy

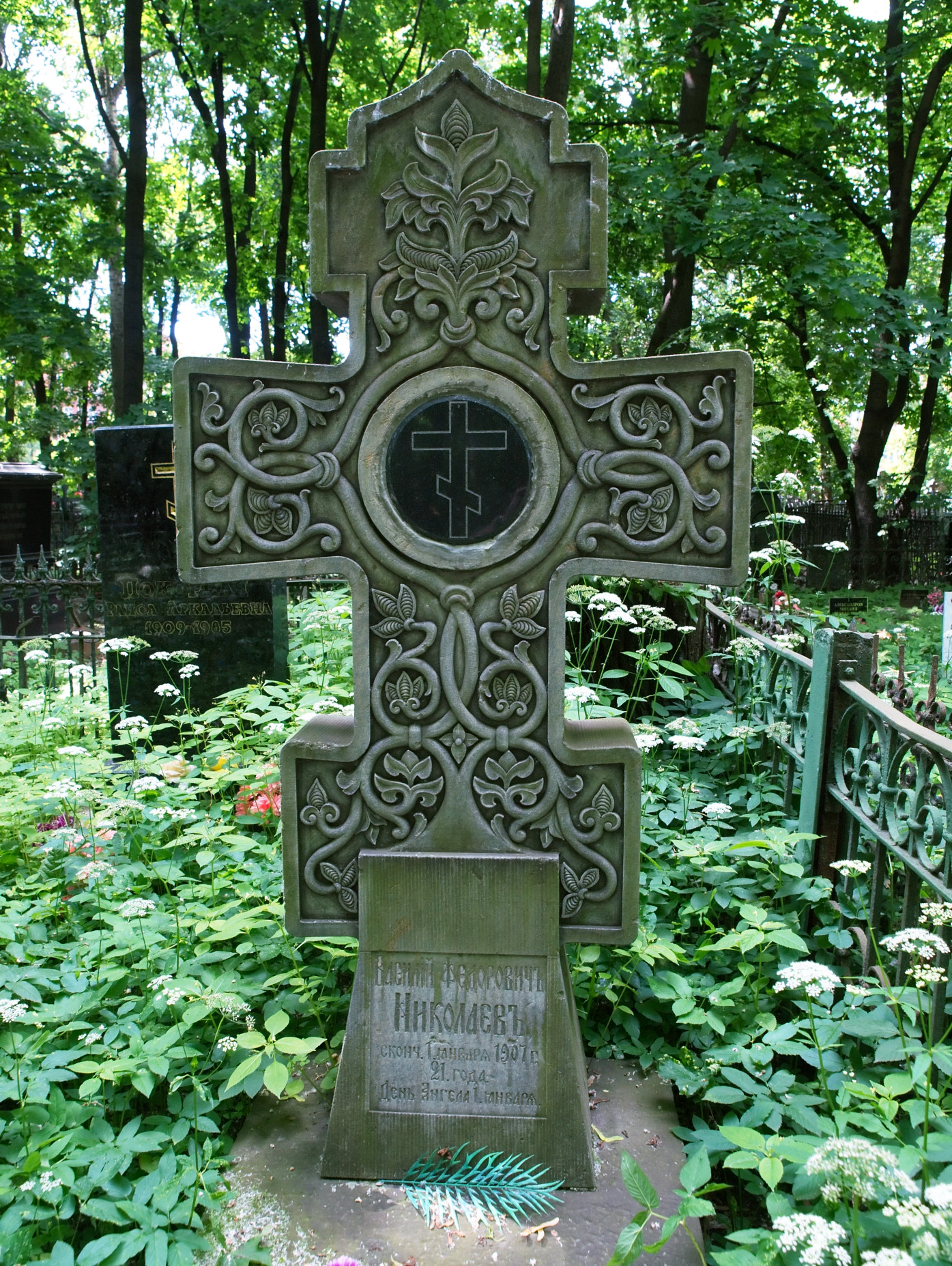
Nikolaev's tomb, 1907

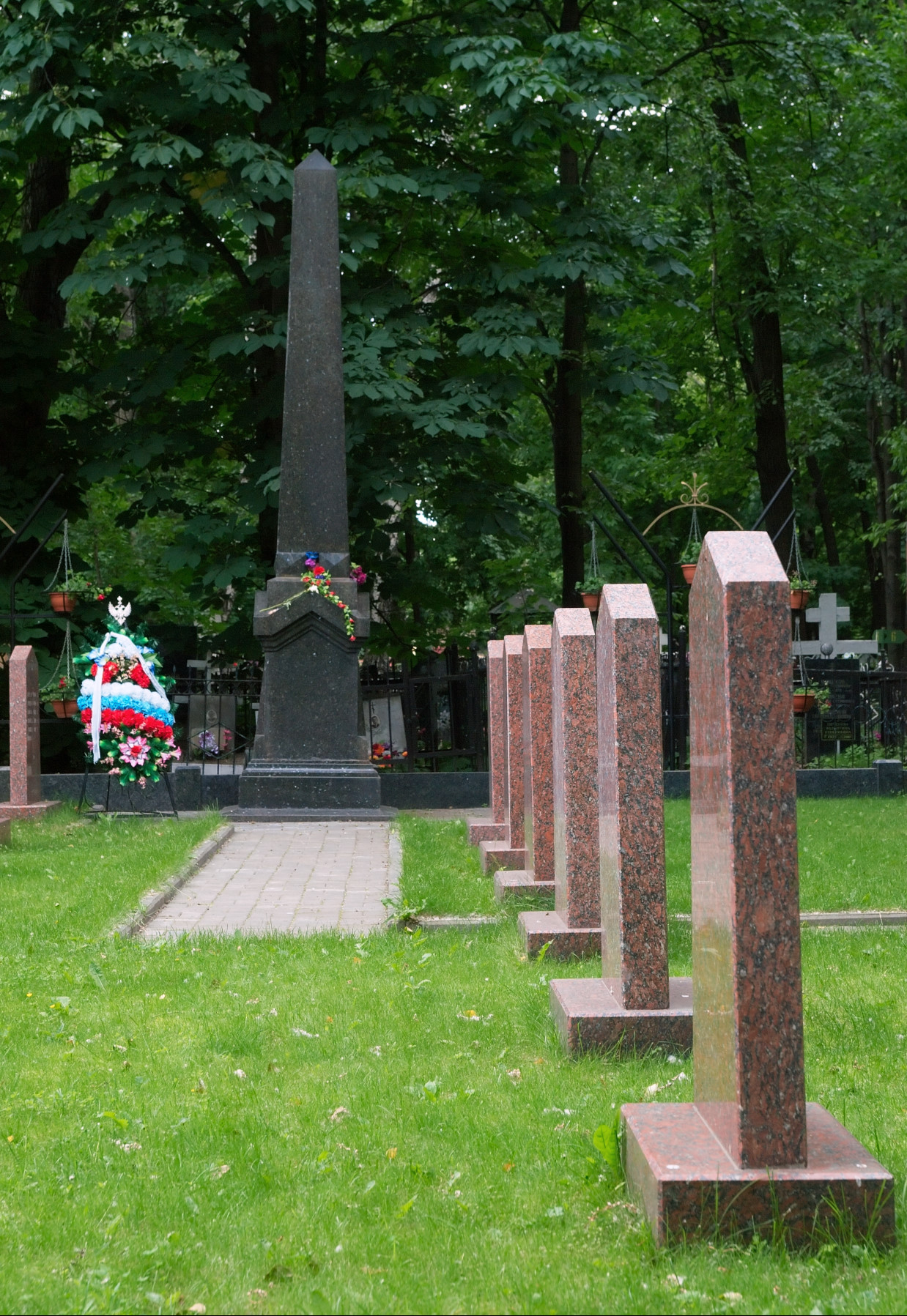
World War II mass graves

Historical graves of Rogozhskoe Cemetery significantly differ from contemporary Moscow cemeteries because of their Old Believer roots. Most graves are shaped as plain stone crosses; there are no Empire style column-shaped graves or personified sculptures. The largest and richest family burial belongs to the Morozov dynasty; the "cemetery within a cemetery" is protected by an elaborate wrought iron canopy. The dynasty apparently continues since the last Morozov tomb is dated from 2005. Other wealthy businesspeople and Old-Rite clergy were buried in black sarcophagus-styled graves. Only a few tombs, like the 1907 Nikolaev tomb, bear distinct sculptural artwork, of abstract floral design.

During the Soviet period, its proximity to military facilities in Lefortovo made Rogozhskoe Cemetery host graves of military personnel (currently, seven graves of the Heroes of the Soviet Union are listed memorials).

== See also ==
- Preobrazhenskoe Cemetery
- Fyodor Gornostaev, the architect of Rogozhskoye Bell Tower
- Agrefeny (fl. 1370), a Russian monk whose account of his travels was preserved in a manuscript at Rogozhskoye
