= Paul of Kolomna =

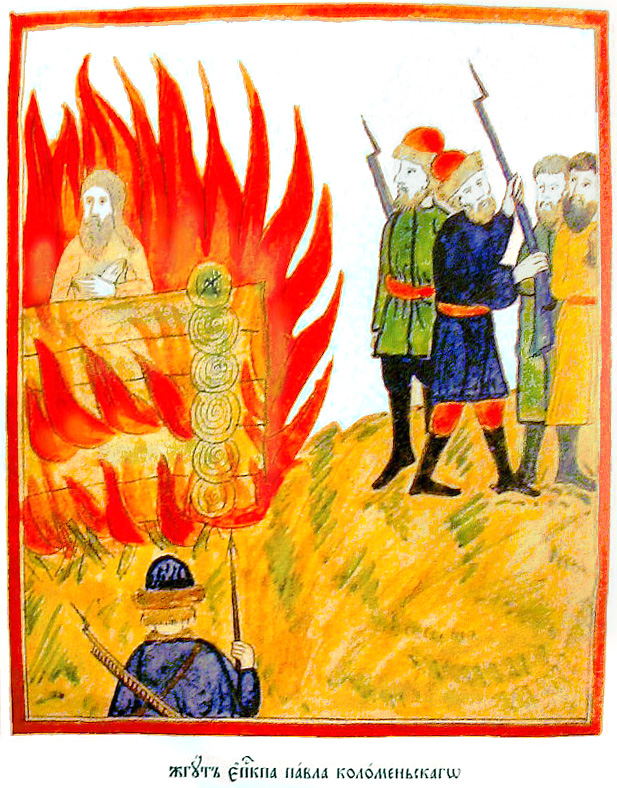
Burning of the recently defrocked Paul of Kolomna (1656). A 19th-century artist's impression

Paul of Kolomna (Russian: Павел Коломенский) was a 17th-century bishop of the Russian Orthodox Church and martyr in the view of the Old Believers.

The son of a rural clergyman, he was born in the village of Kolychevo, Nizhny Novgorod Oblast. He entered monastic orders at Makaryev Monastery, and became treasurer there. He became Bishop of Kolomna on October 17, 1652.

An opponent of the reforms of Patriarch Nikon, he was the only bishop to openly dissent and as a result, he was stripped of his bishopric in 1654. A new bishop was ordained while Paul was still alive. He was banished to Paleostrovsky monastery, on an island in Lake Onega, moving to Khutyn Monastery in 1656. The cause of his death is unknown but he is believed to have been murdered on April 16, 1656. He is regarded as a martyr by the Old Believers.
