= Vetka Island =

Coordinates: 52°13′40″N 32°22′36″E

Vetka Island is an island in the Sozh River near the Belarus town of Vetka. The island is known for a large Old Believers community which lived there in the 18th and 19th centuries. After that time the community was destroyed by the Russian state, however, and the Old Believers had to move further to the West, into Moldova, Romania and Austria, to avoid interference from the Russian authorities.
