= Russian Orthodox Old-Rite Church =

Eastern Orthodox Church movement

Russian Orthodox Old-Rite Church Русская православная старообрядческая церковь
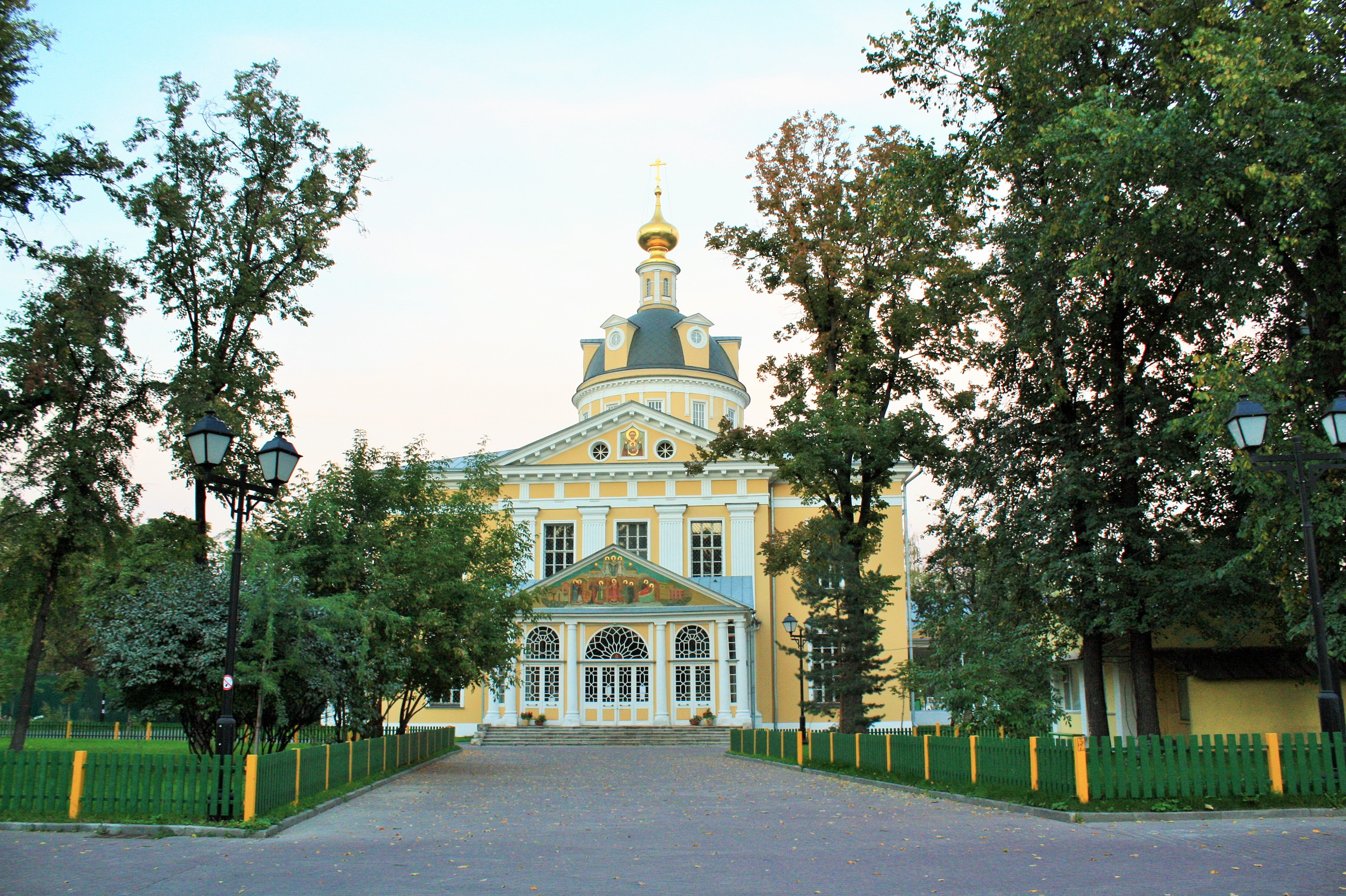
- The Intercession Cathedral of the Rogozhskoye Cemetery, the main church of the Russian Orthodox Old-Rite Church
- Type: Independent Eastern Orthodox
- Classification: Old Believers
- Orientation: Russian Orthodoxy
- Scripture: Ostrog Bible
- Polity: Episcopal
- Primate: Metropolitan Cornelius
- Language: Russian
- Headquarters: Moscow
- Territory: Russia, Hungary, Romania, United States
- Origin: 1871
- Recognition: None
- Separated from: Russian Orthodox Church
- Members: 1,000,000
- Official website: www.rpsc.ru

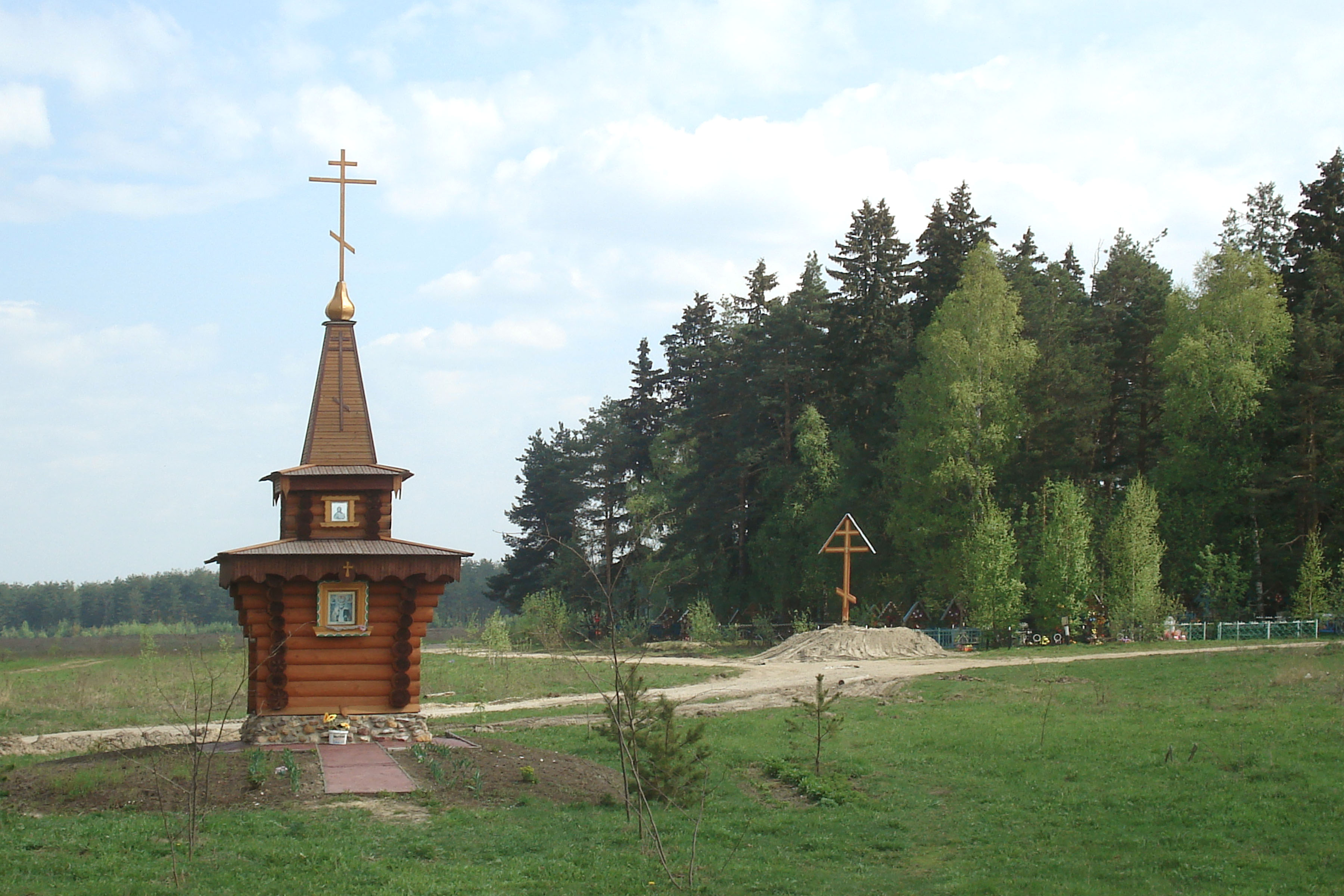
Modern Russian Orthodox Old-Rite Church Chapel. Davidovo cemetery (Guslitsa), Moscow region

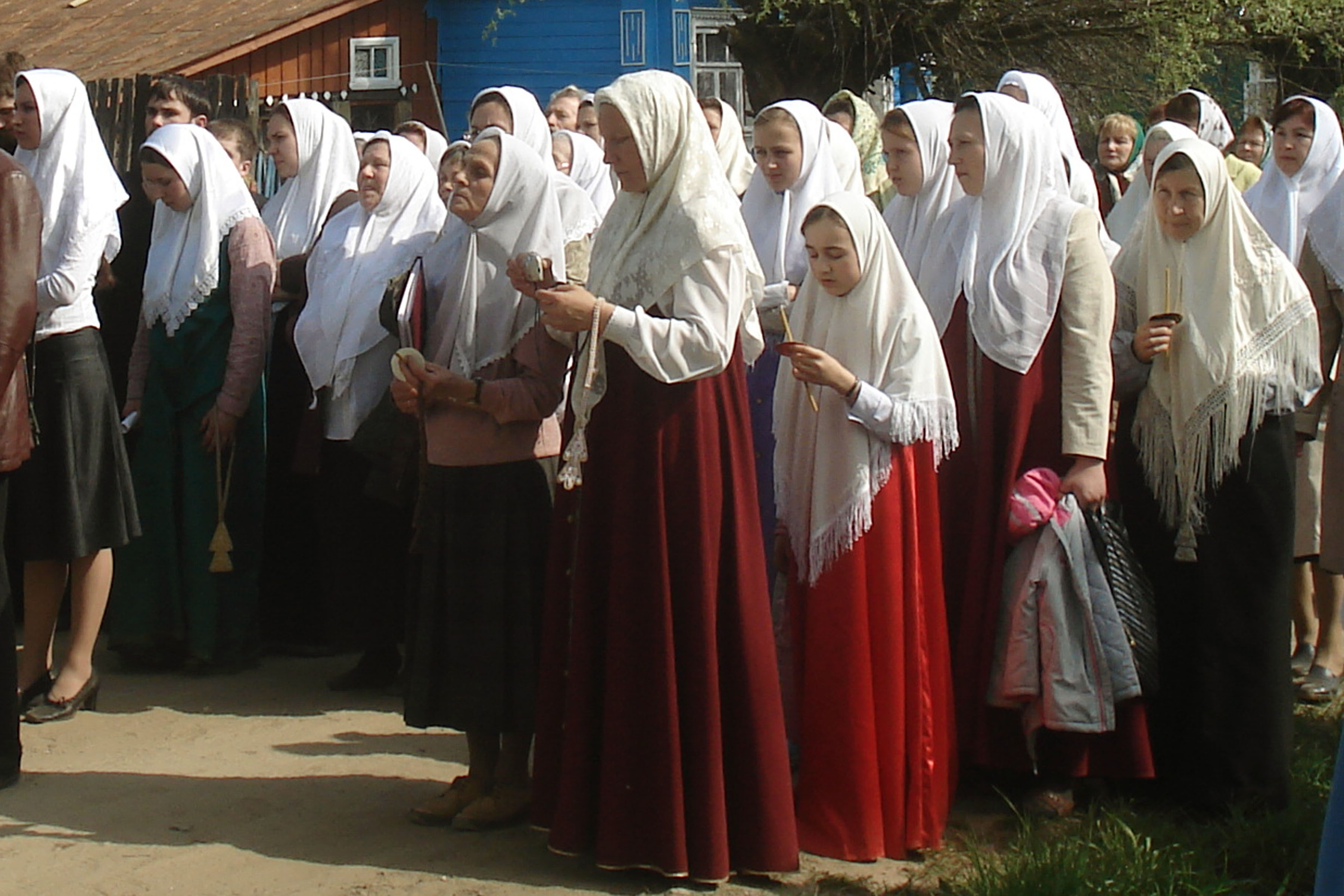
Te Deum. Russian Orthodox Old-Rite Church. Elizarovo (Guslitsa), Moscow region, May 2008

The Russian Orthodox Old-Rite Church (or Russian Orthodox Oldritualist Church, Russian Orthodox Old-Ritualist Church, Russian: Русская Православная Старообрядческая Церковь) is an Eastern Orthodox Church of the Old Believers tradition, which rejected the liturgical and canonical reforms of Patriarch Nikon in the second half of 17th century. It is one of the two Old Believers churches that belong to the Belokrinitskaya Hierarchy - together with the Orthodox Old-Rite Church, sometimes also called Lipovan Orthodox Old-Rite Church. Drevlepravoslavie ("Old/Ancient Orthodoxy") was the common self-designation of the Old Believers and their cause since the 17th century.

The head of the Church carries the title of Metropolitan of Moscow and all Russia (since 1988), with residence at the Rogozhskoye cemetery in Moscow. The current head of the Church, Metropolitan Cornelius (Titov) was elected by the Most Holy Council on October 18, 2005. He was installed as Metropolitan on October 23, 2005. The only pre-Petrine monastery still held by the Old Believers is the Uleima Convent near Uglich.

== History (Belokrinitskaya Hierarchy in Russia, end of 19th century–present) ==
The conversion of metropolitan Ambrose (Papageorgopolos) of Belaya Krinitsa caused a bitter reaction of Russian Imperial authorities and he was soon pressed to leave his see, but not before he consecrated another bishop for his new Church - archbishop Cyril (Timofeyev). The activity of the Belokrinitskaya Hierarchy on the territory of the Russian Empire met with numerous obstructions from Russian imperial authorities, as well as with an internal schism (see Okruzhniki, Neokruzhniki) caused by an Encyclical of 1862. The situation was radically changed with the publication in 1905 of the Emperor's Ukaz "On Religious Tolerance", soon followed by the "unsealing" of the altars at the important religious and cultural center of Old Believers, the Rogozhskoye cemetery.

After the coming of the Bolsheviks to power in 1917 and the Civil war, the Old-Rite Church was subjected to innumerable sufferings and persecutions, just as its former rival, the "Nikonian" Russian Orthodox Church. In 1940, the only bishop who was not imprisoned by the Soviet atheistic authorities was Bishop Sabbas (Ananyev) of Kaluga who, in the same year, single-handedly elevated another bishop - Irenarch (Parfyonov) - to the see of the Archbishop of Moscow. The period of persecution was followed by the period of relative stability, under a tight control from the Soviet secret services. However, the time of perestroika and subsequent changes in the country's political, cultural and economic life had a little effect on the position of the Old-Rite Church in the Russian society - the 17-year tenure of Metropolitan Alimpius (Gusev) is by some considered a time of "recollection".

His follower, Metropolitan Andrian (Chetvergov) in the February 2004, showed himself as a charismatic and talented leader, concerned with formulating and propagating the cultural and religious "message" of the Old Believers for the modern Russian society. While declaring himself as traditionalist and conservative in his public statements, Andrian took a significant step forward in initiating some form of a dialogue with the Russian Orthodox Church and Russian political establishment. Unfortunately, many such plans were cut short with the unexpected death of Metropolitan Andrian on August 10, 2005 during pilgrimage in one of the remote regions of Russia (he had a chronic heart condition). Many questioned the willingness of the church leadership to continue on the "new course" chosen by Andrian. However, the new Metropolitan Cornelius, elected on October 18, 2005, confirmed that he will continue on the policy of openness to the Russian society, started by his predecessor.

As of October 17, 2017, the Russian Orthodox Old-Rite Church has re-entered communion with the Russian Old-Orthodox Church.

== Organization ==
The head of the Church is the Metropolitan of Moscow and All Russia (archbishop in 1846–1988), residing at the Rogozhskoye cemetery in Moscow. He is elected by the highest representative body of the Church - the Holy Council (Освященный Собор). The Council also appoints the members of the Council of the Metropolitanate.

The Church has five local bishops and more than 250 parishes in Russia, Ukraine, Belarus and Kazakhstan. Since several years ago, there have been attempts to restore theological schools for training priests for the Old-Rite Church.

The Russian Orthodox Old-Rite Church belong to the Belokrinitskaya Hierarchy and was until the 16/29 May 2008 in full ecclesiastical and canonical communion with the Lipovan Orthodox Old-Rite Church.

== First Hierarchs ==
Name Title	Portrait	Period		Notes
Sophronius (Zhirov); Bishop of Simbirsk		3 January 1849	1853	Deposed and excommunicated in 1853, repented in 1858, defrocked in 1863.
Anthony (Shutov); Archbishop of Vladimir 1853–1863; Archbishop of Moscow and all Russia		18 February 1863	8 November 1881	
Sabbatius (Levshin); Archbishop of Moscow		10 October 1882	19 March 1898	Retired; died 8 September 1898.
John (Kartushin); Archbishop of Moscow and all Russia		16 October 1898	24 April 1915	
Meletius (Kartushin); Archbishop of Moscow and all Russia		30 August 1915	4 June 1934	
Vincent (Nikitin); Bishop of Caucasus		February 1935	13 April 1938	Locum tenens; imprisoned
Sabbas (Ananyev); Bishop of Kaluga, Smolensk and Bryansk		1938	1940	The only Old-Rite bishop who was not imprisoned in the beginning of the 1940s; Single-handedly elevated bishop Irinarch of Samara and Ufa to the Archbishop of Moscow in 1940. Died in 1943.
Irenarch (Parfyonov); Archbishop of Moscow and all Russia		April 1941	7 March 1952	
Flavian (Slesarev)		16 March 1952	25 December 1960	
Joseph (Morzhakov)		19 February 1961	3 November 1970	
Nicodemus (Latyshev)		24 October 1971	11 February 1986	
Alimpius (Gusev)		6 July 1986	31 December 2003	In 1988 elevated to the rank of the Metropolitan of Moscow and all Russia, enthroned 24 July 1988.
Andrian (Chetvergov); Metropolitan of Moscow and all Russia		9 February 2004	10 August 2005	
Cornelius (Titov)		18 October 2005	Incumbent	

== See also ==
- Old Believers
- Russian Orthodox Church
- Belokrinitskaya Hierarchy

== Bibliography ==
- S. G. Vurgraft, I. A. Ushakov. Staroobriadchestvo. Litsa, predmety, sobytiia i simvoly. Opyt entsiklopedicheskogo slovaria [The Old Believers: Figures, Subjects, Events and Symbols. An Encyclopedic Dictionary] Moscow: Tserkov, 1996.
