= Russian Old-Orthodox Church =

Eastern Orthodox Church

The Russian Old Orthodox Church (Russian: Русская Древлеправославная Церковь) is an Eastern Orthodox Church of the Old Believers tradition, born of a schism within the Russian Orthodox Church (raskol) during the 17th century (Old Believers). This jurisdiction incorporated those Old Believer groups which refused to accept the authority of Belokrinitskaya Hierarchy, est. 1846 (see Russian Orthodox Old-Rite Church). It was also known as Novozybkov Hierarchy (by the name of the city where its chief hierarch resided in 1963–2000). It is considered to be independent of the Eastern Orthodox Communion i.e. it is not recognised by the Patriarch of Constantinople, nor by any of the Orthodox churches in communion with the Patriarch.

From 1963 until 2002, the official title of its chief hierarch was Archbishop of Novozybkov, Moscow and all Russia. In 2000, with the move of the Archbishop's residence to Moscow, the toponym Novozybkov was dropped from the title. Since March 2003, the official title of the church leader is Patriarch of Moscow and All Russia. In 2023, the head of the Church was Patriarch Alexander (Kalinin; since 9 May 2000, Patriarch since 3 March 2003).

== History ==
The Russian Old Orthodox Church was formed from the groups of Old Believers who insisted on preserving the traditional church structure and hierarchy (as opposed to Bespopovtsy groups), but refused to accept the authority of Metropolitan Amvrosii (Popovitch) who converted in 1846 and founded the Belokrinitskaya Hierarchy, due to some canonical problems with his conversion and the ordination of its second bishop, Kiril (Amvrosii ordained him alone, which was against canons). These Old Believers groups continued to exist without a bishop until 1923 when they created their own hierarchy, by receiving the Renovationist Archbishop Nikola (Pozdnev) of Saratov (1853–1934). He was received (like Amvrosii in 1846) by chrismation on November 4, 1923, and given a title Archbishop of Moscow, Saratov and all old Orthodox Christians of Russia. Some problems with Nikola's installation and with the 'validity' of this jurisdiction in general was that the Renovationist Church was a schism from the Russian Orthodox Church and archbishop Nikola, together with other Renovationist clergy was officially suspended from all priestly functions by the Council of Bishops under Patriarch Tikhon (Bellavin) in 1923. Also, some Old Believers had doubts whether Nikola was baptized by infusion rather than triple immersion (see Baptism). These doubts were rejected by the Moscow Council of the Old-Orthodox Church in May 1924.

In order to avoid the same "error" which they thought the leaders of the Belokrinitskaya Hierarchy had made, Archbishop Nikola did not ordain any new bishops single-handedly – not until the conversion of another bishop from the Russian Orthodox Church, Stephan (Rastorguev), in September 1929. Four more bishops were ordained in subsequent years. Like many other Christian Churches in Soviet Russia, the Old-Orthodox Church suffered heavy persecution from atheistic authorities. One of the outcomes of these conditions was the frequent migration of the see of its first hierarch: Moscow (1924–1955); Kuibyshev – now Samara (1955–1963); Novozybkov (in Bryansk region) (1963–2000). In 2000, the residence was moved back to Moscow.

In the 1990s, several bishops separated from the central administration of the Russian Old-Orthodox Church, forming two schismatic ecclesiastical bodies:

- Slavo-Georgian (Iberian) Old-Orthodox Church (Славяно-Грузинская Иверская Древлеправославная Церковь) was created in the beginning of the 1990s by two schismatic bishops (Leonty of Perm and Flavian of Moscow). This church has three bishops and a couple of parishes in Georgia and in Russia. Its distinctive feature is that liturgical services are held in both Slavonic and Old Georgian, using pre-18th century Old Georgian liturgical books.
- Old Orthodox Church of Russia (Древлеправославная Церковь России) was formed in 1999 in response to the alleged "Renovationist" policies of the church's central administration. It currently has three bishops and 12 parishes in Russia and Romania.

Since the 1990s, some of these schismatic bishops restored communion with the Russian Old-Orthodox Church, but the two churches these schisms created still exist.

In 2003, in a highly controversial move, the leaders of the Old-Orthodox Church resolved to "restore" the patriarchate in the "Russian Church", thus setting up a rival Patriarchate of Moscow in opposition to the Patriarch Aleksy II (Ridiger), the head of the Russian Orthodox Church. This act was bound to complicate the relationship with the Russian Orthodox Church and another Old Believer Church claiming to be the authentic Russian hierarchy – the Belokrinitskaya Hierarchy or Russian Orthodox Old-Rite Church, today, these two churches are officially in communion with each other.

== Organisation ==
The Holy Council is the highest legislative body, which elects the Patriarch and the members of the Chief Ecclesiastical Council. Today, the Old-Orthodox Church has six hierarchs and about more than 10 parishes on the former Soviet Union territory and four parishes in Romania (as of 1996).

== First Hierarchs of Russian Old-Orthodox Church ==
Nikola (Pozdnev)	Archbishop of Moscow, Saratov and All Russia	December 19, 1923 – September 1, 1934
Stephan (Rastorguev)	locum tenens	1934 – July 1935
Stephan (Rastorguev)	Archbishop of Moscow and All Russia	July 1935 – September 2 [?], 1937
Mikhail (Kochetov)		May 1938 – April 6, 1944
Ioann (Kalinin)		October 14, 1944 – August 27, 1955
Epiphaniy (Abramov)	Archbishop of Kuibyshev, Moscow and All Russia	November 5, 1955 – 1963 (d. 1965)
Jeremiah (Matvievich)	Archbishop of Novozybkov, Moscow and All Russia	March 24, 1963 – June 17, 1969
Pavel (Mashinin)		July 27, 1969 – June 1977
Varsonophiy (Ovsyannikov)	locum tenens	June 1977 – September 1979
Gennadiy (Antonov)		September 23, 1979 – February 2, 1996
Aristarkh (Kalinin)		February 1996 – May 4, 2000
Aleksandr (Kalinin)	Archbishop of Moscow and All Russia	May 9, 2000 – March 3, 2002
Aleksandr (Kalinin)	Patriarch of Moscow and All Russia	March 3, 2002 – present

== See also ==
- Old Believers
- Russian Orthodox Old-Rite Church
- Popovtsy
- Russian Orthodox Church

== Bibliography ==
- S. G. Vurgraft, I. A. Ushakov. Staroobriadchestvo. Litsa, predmety, sobytiia i simvoly. Opyt entsiklopedicheskogo slovaria [The Old Believers: Figures, Subjects, Events and Symbols. An Encyclopedic Dictionary] Moscow: Tserkov, 1996.
