= Belokrinitskaya Hierarchy =

Church hierarchy created by the Old Believers

The Belokrinitskaya Hierarchy (Russian: Белокриницкая иерархия, Belokrinitskoe Soglasiye, Russian: Белокриницкое согласие) is the first full and stable church hierarchy to be created by the Old Believers.

== History ==
After the reforms of Patriarch Nikon of Moscow in the 1650s, many members of the Russian Orthodox Church refused to acknowledge the changes that he had made to bring the church in line with the Greek Orthodox Church.

The Belokrinitskaya Hierarchy was created in 1846 by acceptance of Greek Metropolitan Ambrose. The hierarchy is called after the name of the see of First Hierarch Belaya Krinitsa, Bukovina, in Austria-Hungary (currently Chernivtsi Oblast, Ukraine).

Major sponsorship for organizing this hierarchy (such as search for a metropolitan, organizing the necessary facilities, the smuggling of candidates for priesthood through the Russian border in both directions) came also from Russian Old Believer merchant families, such as Ryabushinskie and Morozovy.

Some confusion may occur when using the term Belokrinitskoe Soglasie in respect to a schism of Okruzhniki (Encyclicalists) and Neokruzhniki (Non-Encyclicalists). According to one point of view, both sides of the schism originated from the Rogozhskoe Cemetery's administrative system and so both belong to the Belokrinitskoe Soglasie. The other is that almost all of the Rogozhskoe Cemetery priests and authorities were Okruzhniki and so the term Belokrinitskoe Soglasie sometimes means the Okruzhniki.

== Branches ==
Currently, there are two administratively independent branches of the Belokrinitskaya Hierarchy.

- The Russian Orthodox Old-Rite Church, with its centre in Rogozhskaya Cemetery, in Moscow, unites the Old Believers of the Belokrinitskaya Hierarchy in Russia and the rest of the former Soviet Union.
- The Lipovan Orthodox Old-Rite Church, with the centre in Brăila, Romania, unites the Old Believers of the Belokrinitskaya Hierarchy in Romania and the diaspora
- The Neokruzhniki (Non-Encyclicalist) Hierarchy arose as a result of the split that began after the release of the Encyclical of 1862 and it was suppressed in the Soviet times.
- The Old Orthodox Church of Ukraine separated from the Russian Orthodox Old-Rite Church in 2022 and oi in communion with the Lipovan Orthodox Old-Rite Church.

== Literature ==
- Панкратов, А. В. (2002). "Белокриницкая иерархия". Православная энциклопедия. Vol. 4. Moscow. pp. 542–556.
- Мануил (Чибисов), игумен (2008). Белокриницкая иерархия: Споры вокруг вопроса о её каноничности в России во второй половине XIX - начале XX вв. Кострома: Костромской государственный университет имени Н. А. Некрасова. ISBN 978-5-7591-0939-6.
- About the Acceptance of Metropolitan Ambrose: Metropolitan Ambrose and His Sincere Devotion to the Old Belief (Belokrinitskaya Hierarchy, 2025) ISBN 9798315881919
