= Preobrazhenskoye Cemetery =

Old Believers cemetery in Moscow

- Преображенское кладбище
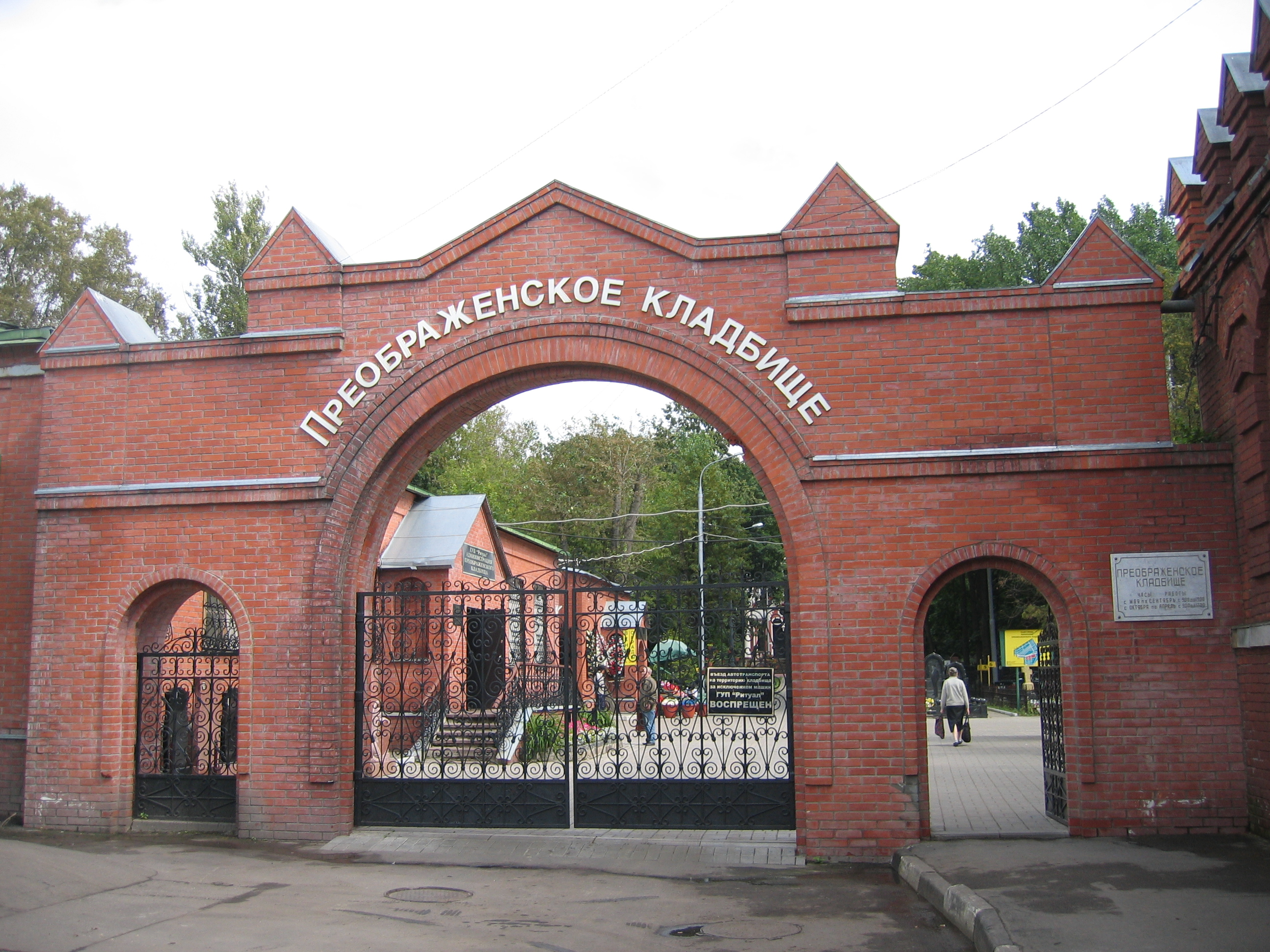

Details
- Established: 1777
- Location: Moscow
- Country: Russia
- Coordinates: 55°47′26″N 37°43′16″E
- Size: 16.5 hectares (41 acres)

Preobrazhenskoye Cemetery (Russian: Преображенское кладбище, lit. Transfiguration Cemetery) is a cemetery in the eastern part of Moscow long associated with Old Believers. It was inaugurated by a Fedoseevtsy merchant in 1777 as a plague quarantine disguising the Bespopovtsy monastery. At that time the territory of the cemetery was located outside Moscow, but near its border. The cemetery soon became the spiritual and administrative center of all the Fedoseevtsy in Russia (just like the Rogozhskoe cemetery became an administrative and cultural centre for most Popovtsy Old Believers).

The cloister consisted of two equal square areas, a monastery for men and a nunnery for women, separated by a road to the cemetery. Construction work was in progress throughout the 1790s and the first decade of the 19th century. At that time, the monastery asylum was home to 1,500 people, while the chapels were attended by as many as 10,000 Old Believers. Every church within the monastery was styled a chapel; like other Bespopovtsy, the Fedoseevtsy reject priesthood, and so even their largest temples are called chapels rather than churches, since they have no altar. The area was surrounded by brick walls with decorative pseudo-gothic towers.

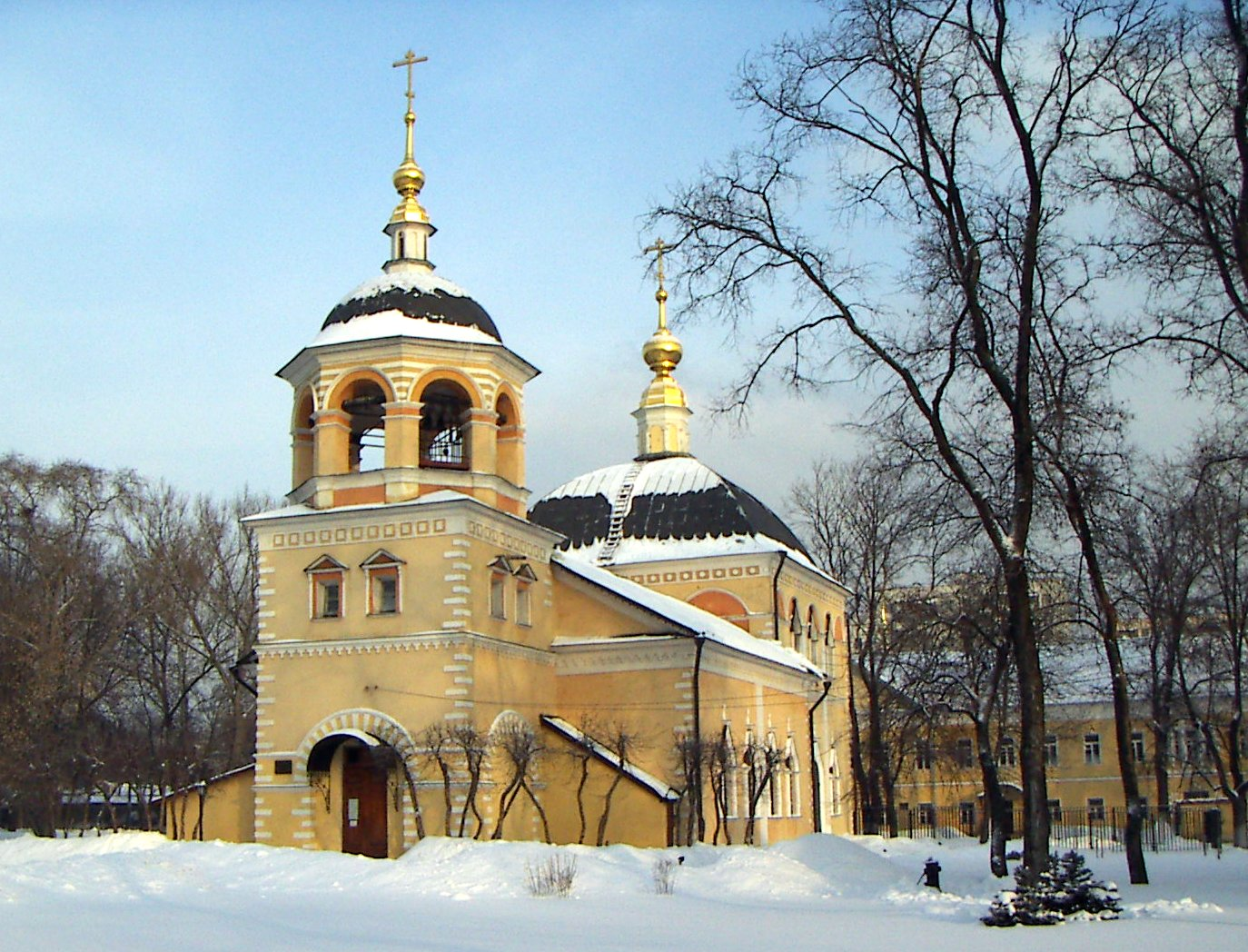
Fedoseevtsy chapel

General view from Preobrazhensky Val

In the mid-19th century the "male" part of the monastery was confiscated from the Fedoseevtsy by the imperial administration to be transformed into the monastery of the Edinovertsy, the only legal denomination of Old Believers in Imperial Russia. The cloister, which came to be known as the St Nicholas Monastery of the Edinovertsy, boasted the largest collection of Old Believer literature (the Khludov bequest) and as many as 1,300 ancient icons.

After the October Revolution the St. Nicholas Monastery was occupied by the Obnovlentsy, while the icons and the books were taken to the State Historical Museum and the Tretyakov Gallery. Later the monastery was divided between the Pomortsy Old Believers and the nearby parish of the official Russian Orthodox Church. The orthodox parish took a church above the gates with surrounding quarters, a bell-tower and a western part of the temple. The eastern part of the temple and several utilities in the western part of the territory belong to Pomortsy. The two parts of a single temple are currently separated by a thick brick wall, and compartments are occupied by different denominations. The women's part of Preobrazhenka avoided such a dissension, and still belongs to the Fedoseevtsy.

The cemetery is also noted as a place where the first Eternal flame in Moscow was kindled in order to commemorate the World War II dead.

== Notable people buried in the Preobrazhenskoye Cemetery ==
- Vladimir Kuts
- Sergei Magnitsky
- Aleksey Batalov
- Viktor Nikiforov
- Konstantin Loktev
- Yevgeny Feofanov
- Ivan Zimin
