= Lestovka =

Type of prayer rope

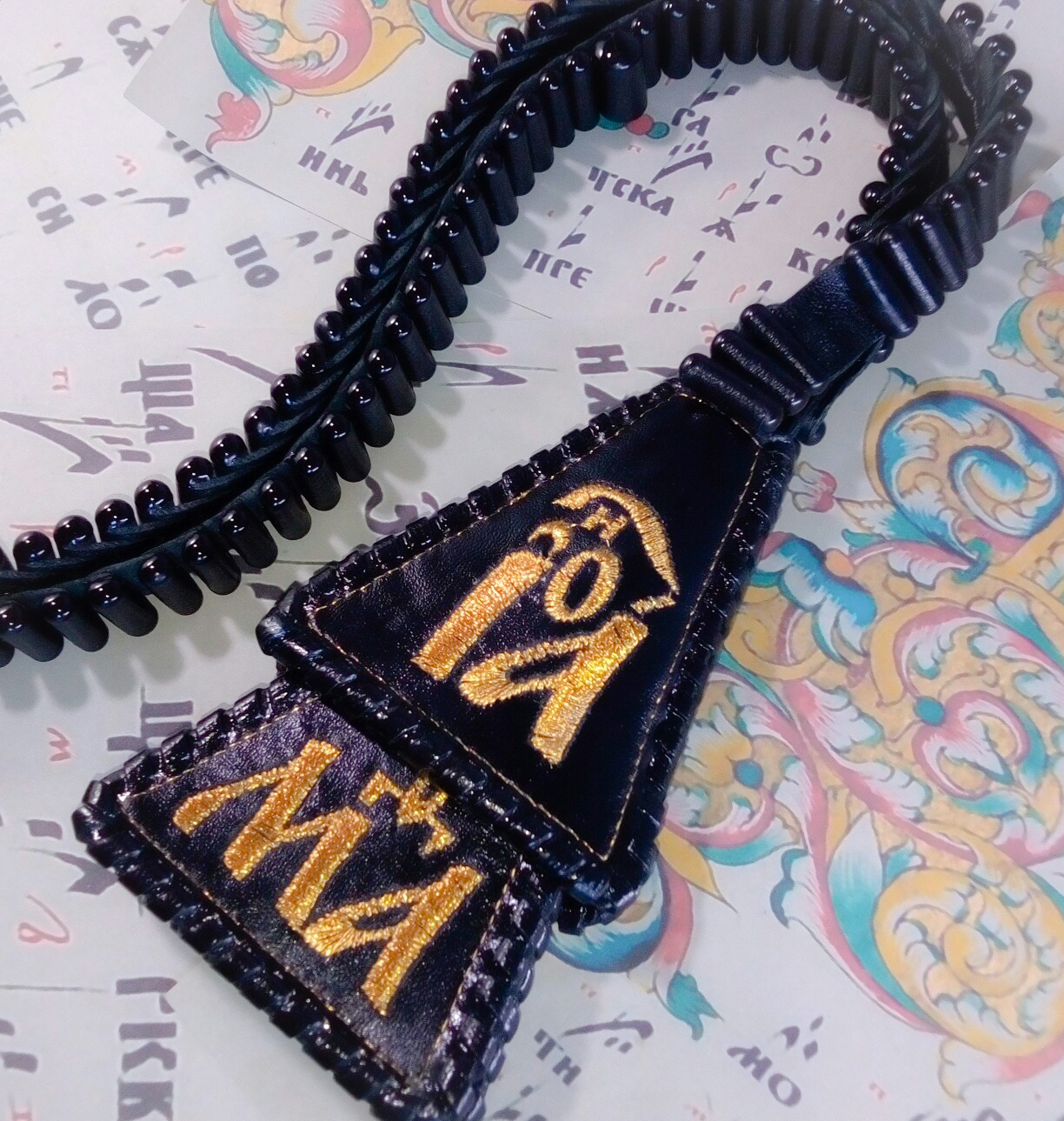
Lestovka with the names of the Apostles the work of the master Jelisaveta Gornitskaya

Lestovka (Russian: лeстовка) is a traditional type of prayer rope made of leather or fabric. Historically in general use in old Russia, it is still used today by Russian Old Believers, such as the Russian Orthodox Christians and Russian Orthodox Oldritualist Church, Pomorian Old-Orthodox Church and Edinoverians, whether Orthodox or Greek Catholic.

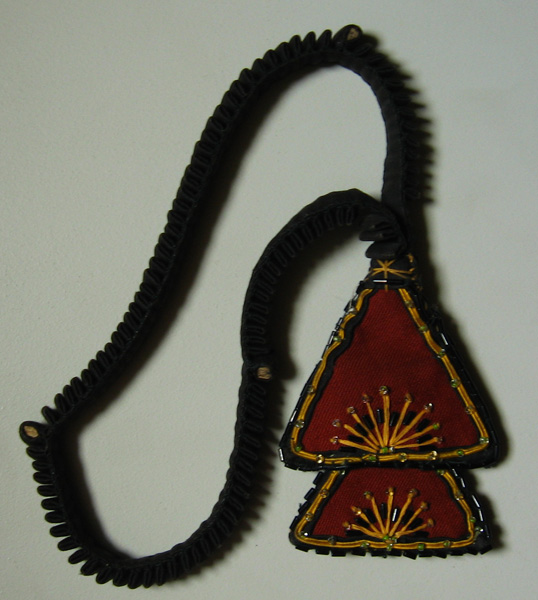
A lestovka; the lapostki are decorated with little beads

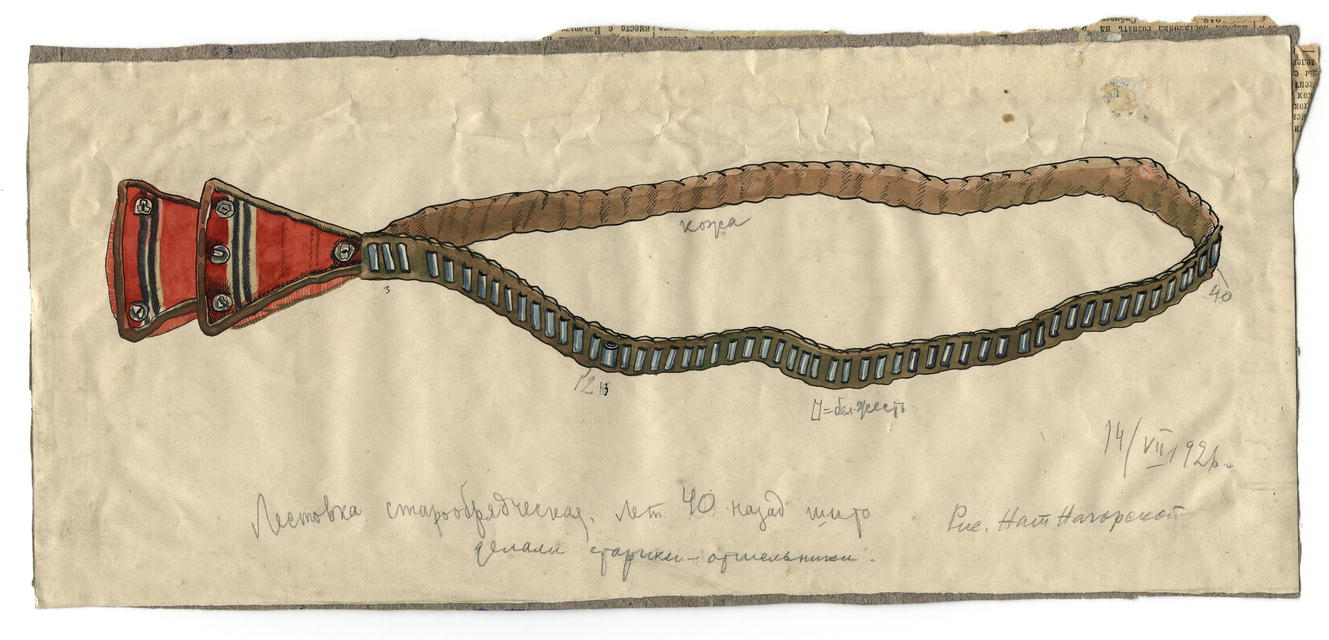
Sketch of a lestovka made by a Russian ethnographer.

== Form and symbolism ==
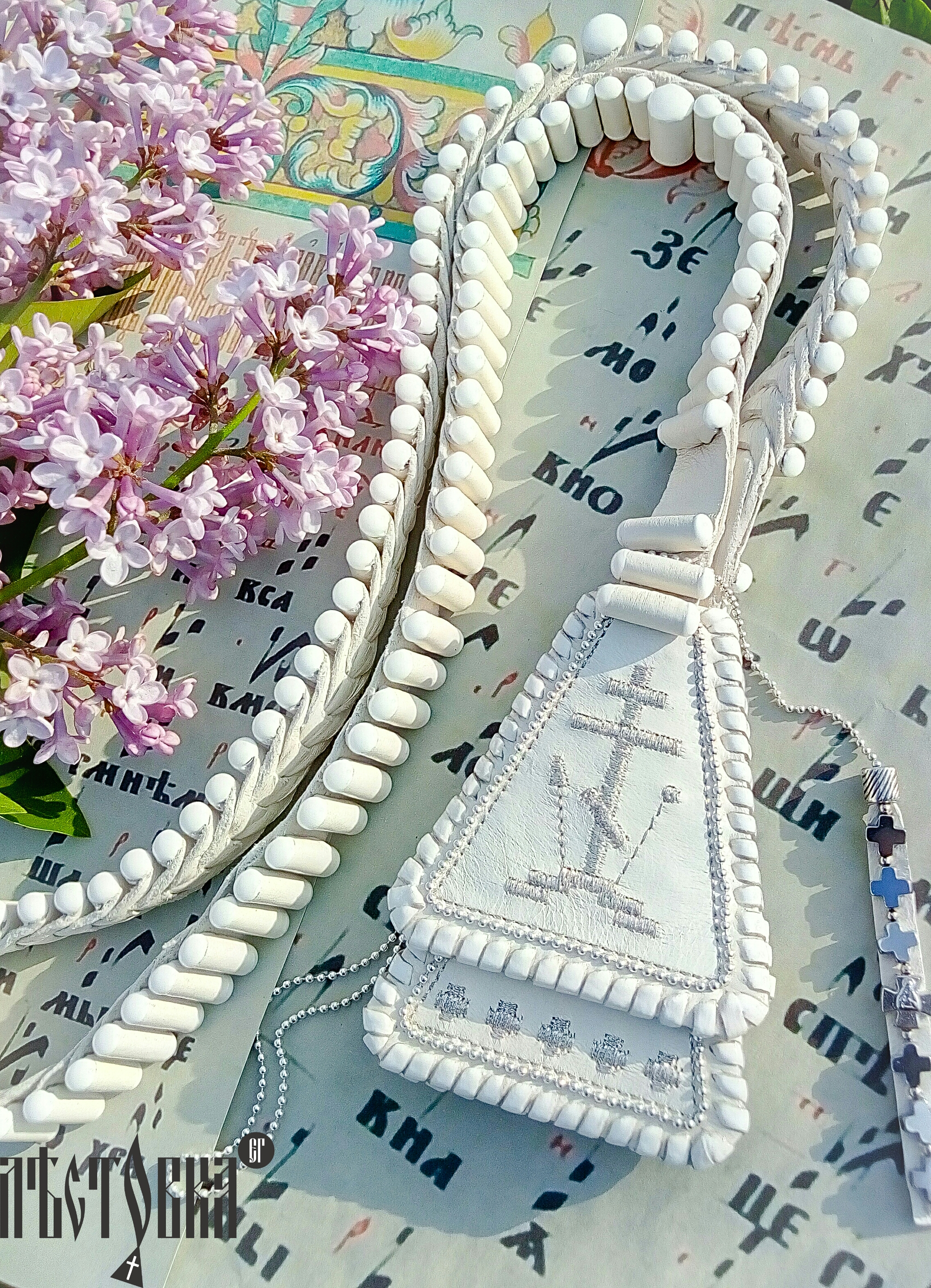
Lestovka with the image of the cross of Calvary

The Lestovka is traditionally constructed of leather, with "steps" made by looping leather around small twigs sections on which paper scrolls with Jesus Prayer are wound. It has a total of 109 "steps" – small loops or knots, unevenly grouped: 3/12/38/33/17/3 steps. Traditionally, Lestovki are made from genuine leather, but poorer people make Lestovki from fabric or other materials.

At the bottom of the lestovka hang four lapostki, which are flaps, usually triangular, but such variations as bell or oak-leaf shapes are not uncommon. These represent the four Gospels, and sometimes have icons, crosses, religious symbols or scripture verses printed or stitched on them, the stitching around these leaves symbolising the teaching of the Gospels. Simpler lestovkas will have the lapostki covered with silk brocade or velvet, and this is a traditional way of reusing church fabrics, either of vestments that have become too worn out for clergy to wear, or of altar-coverings and similar fabrics.

Near these lapostki are seven small movable pieces. They are called peredvizki. Some masters make them in the form of 7 crosses or beads. These seven pieces represent the seven Mysteries (Sacraments) of the Church, their location near the leaves of the lapostki indicating their origin in and central relation to the Gospels.

In the Old Believer tradition, seven small moving parts are made invisible. But especially skilled craftsmen make them with an elevator system - they can be extended and then put back in place.

Next, the main loop will have three large steps on either side where it joins the lapostki (in lestovkas that are joined together), and on the Lestovka itself are three more large steps, giving a total of nine, representing the nine months in which Christ was in the womb of the Theotokos (Blessed Virgin Mary), and also for the nine choirs of angels.

After the three large steps on either side is a space, representing the heavens and the earth.

Coming to the main set of counters, one finds twelve small babochki (rungs, steps), signifying the Twelve Apostles. Then are thirty-eight small counters, representing the thirty-six weeks and two days during which the Theotokos carried Christ in her womb. Next, thirty-three small counters for the number of years Christ lived on earth, followed by seventeen small counters for the seventeen Old Testament prophets plus St John the Baptist who prophesied about the coming of Christ.

== Usage ==
If one is unable to attend services in church for whatever reasons, it is considered commendable to pray on the lestovka, using a number of repetitions of the Jesus Prayer combined with specific bows and prostrations.

When using the lestovka as part of a rule of prayer, the three counters at either end are used for the following prayers (accompanied by bows) at the end and beginning of the prayer session:

Боже, милостивъ бѹди мне грѣшномѹ. (грѣшнѣй if one is female)
Создави мѧ, Господи, помилѹй мѧ.
Безъ числа согрѣшихъ, Господи, прости мѧ.

God be merciful to me a sinner. (bow)
Thou hast created me; Lord, have mercy on me. (bow)
I have sinned immeasurably; Lord, forgive me. (bow)

Some say, at the last line, "помилѹй и прости мѧ грѣшнаго/грѣшнѹю" (have mercy and forgive me a sinner) instead of "прости мѧ" (forgive me).

The remaining one hundred small counters are used for the repetition of the Jesus Prayer, with bows and prostrations.

Other uses of the lestovka include counting the twelve or forty repetitions of Lord have mercy used as responses at the Divine Liturgy and Canonical hours. The seventeen counters are also used to count the number of bows during the Prayer of Saint Ephrem.

Lestovka with 150 steps is used to read prayers to the Virgin Mary.

== Outside of Old Belief ==
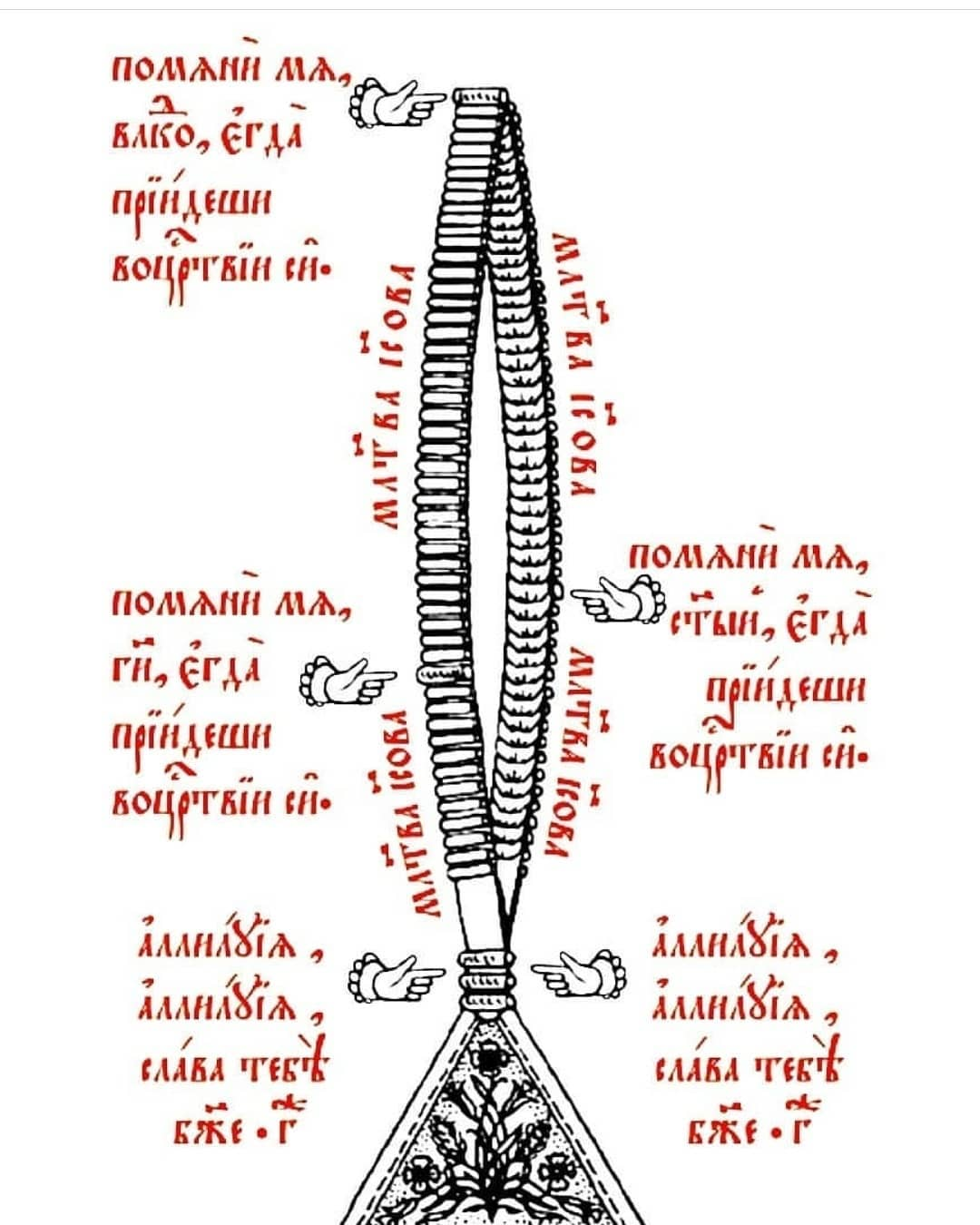
Prayers that are written on the scrolls inside Lestovka

Lestovka is often found outside communities that adhere to the liturgical practices of the Old Believers. Eastern Catholic and Eastern Orthodox Christians who are knowledgeable about Slavic traditions of the Byzantine rite love to own and use them. Members of the Russian Orthodox Church today are increasingly using lestovka. Examples of Russian Orthodox saints depicted with a lestovka are Seraphim of Sarov, Sergius of Radonezh, Kiev Pechersk Saints and many other saints of the Russian Orthodox Church. Notably, many people outside of Old Believer or Old Ritualist circles use smaller lestovki with only 50 steps, to differentiate from Old Ritualitsts proper.

== See also ==
- Russian Orthodox Oldritualist Church
- Old Believers
- Hesychasm

== Sources and references ==
- Вургафт С.Г., Ушаков И.А. Старообрядчество. Лица, события, предметы и символы. Опыт энциклопедического словаря, Москва 1996 (Vurgaft S.G., Ušakov I.A. Old Believers. Persons, Events, Objects and Symbols. Attempt to an Encyclopedian Dictionary. Moscow, 1996)
