= Pomory =

Pomory may refer to:

- Pomors, an ethnographic group descended from Russian settlers living on the White Sea coasts
- Pomortsy, members of the Pomorian Old-Orthodox Church
