= Theodosians =

Theodosians can refer to:

- The Theodosian dynasty of Roman Emperors

In Christianity:

- The Theodosians (miaphysite faction), supporters of Pope Theodosius I of Alexandria
- The Fedoseevtsy, a branch of the Raskolniks
