= Old Believers =

Russian Old Ritualist religious dissenters

- староверы, старообрядцы
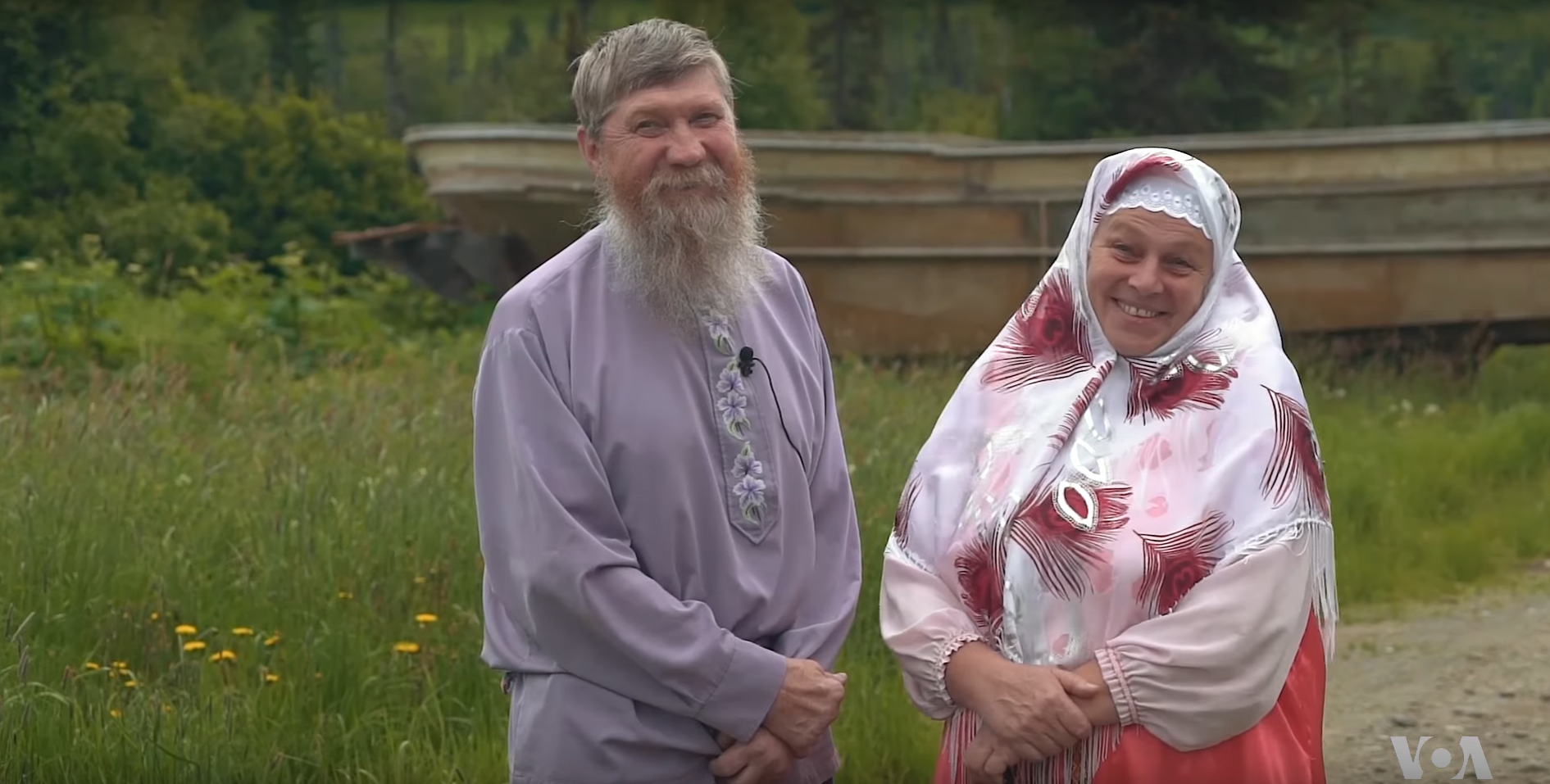
- Two Old Believers from Nikolaevsk, Alaska, in traditional dress
- Type: Russian Orthodoxy
- Popovtsy: Russian Orthodox Old-Rite Church; Russian Old-Orthodox Church; Lipovan Orthodox Old-Rite Church; Old-Orthodox Church of Ukraine; Edinoverie
- Bezpopovtsy: Pomorian Old-Orthodox Church; Old-Pomorian (Fedoseean) Old-Orthodox Church
- Region: former USSR, Western diaspora
- Language: Russian, Church Slavonic
- Liturgy: Traditional Russian variation of Byzantine Rite
- Founder: Anti-reform dissenters
- Origin: early 1700s Tsardom of Russia
- Separated from: Russian Orthodox Church
- Other names: Old Ritualists, Old Orthodox

Old Believers or Old Ritualists (Russian: староверы, romanized: starovery or старообрядцы, staroobryadtsy) is the common term for numerous religious communities that maintain the old liturgical and ritual practices of the Russian Orthodox Church, as they were before the reforms of Patriarch Nikon of Moscow between 1653 and 1656. The old rite and its followers were anathematized in 1667, and Old Belief gradually emerged from the resulting schism.

The antecedents of the movement regarded the reform as heralding the End of Days, and the Russian church and state as servants of the Antichrist. Fleeing persecution by the government, they settled in remote areas or escaped to the neighboring countries. Their communities were marked by strict morals and religious devotion, including various taboos meant to separate them from the outer world. They rejected the Westernization measures of Peter the Great, preserving traditional Russian culture, like long beards for men.

Lacking a central organization, the main division within Old Belief is between the relatively conservative popovtsy, or "priestly", who were willing to employ renegade priests from the state church, maintaining the liturgy and sacraments; and the more radical bezpopovtsy, or "priestless", who rejected the validity of "Nikonite" ordination, and had to dispense with priests and all sacraments performed by them, appointing lay leaders instead. Various polemics produced numerous subdivisions, known as "accords". Old Belief covers a spectrum ranging from the established and hierarchic "priestly" Russian Orthodox Old-Rite Church, to the anarchistic "priestless" Fugitives.

From the mid-18th century, under Catherine the Great, Old Believers gained nearly complete tolerance, and large urban communities emerged, the members of which had a leading role in Russian economy and society. Persecution and discrimination were renewed under Alexander I, and especially Nicholas I, from 1820 onward. Total freedom of religion and equal rights were granted only after the Russian Revolution of 1905, followed by a brief golden age. In the beginning of the 20th century, demographers estimated the number of Old Believers to have been between 10 million and 20 million. The destruction wrought during the Stalin era decimated the communities, leaving few who adhered to their traditions, and a wave of refugees established new centers in the West. The movement is enjoying a renewal in the post-Soviet states, and in the dawn of the 21st century, there are over 1 million Old Believers who reside mostly in Russia, Latvia, Lithuania, Romania, Ukraine, Belarus, Estonia, and the United States.

== Belief and practice ==
=== Old Rite ===
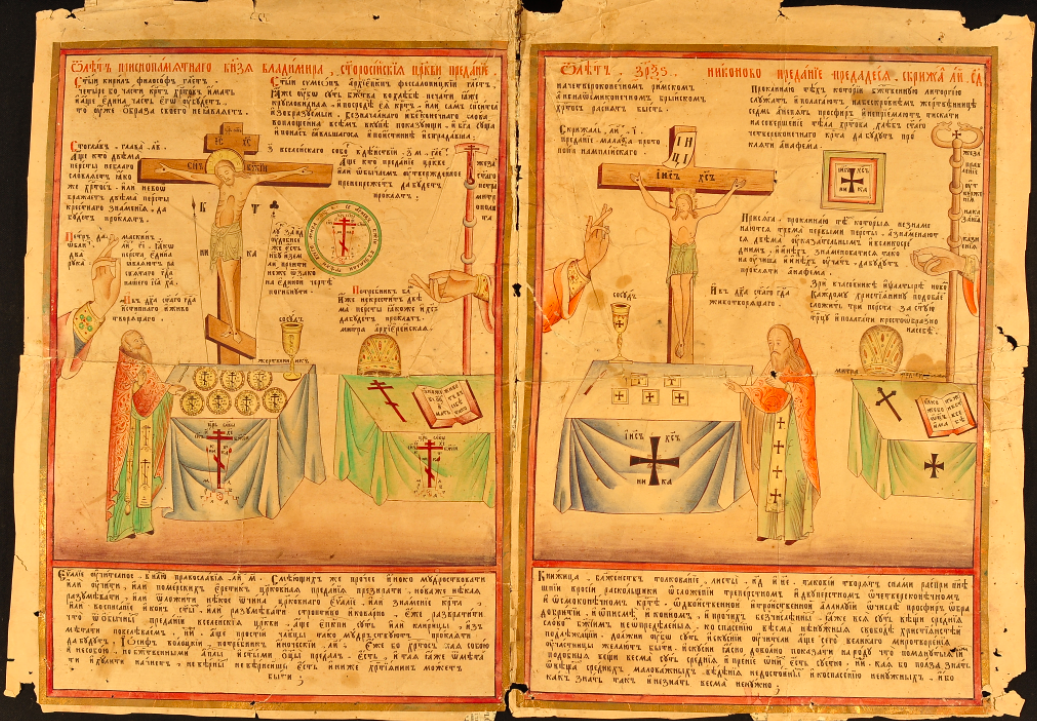
A 19th-century illustration comparing the traditional (left) and the reformed (right) rites. Note the manner of holding the fingers when crossing oneself, the shape of the cross and the number of Prosphora.

While Old Belief is highly diverse, all its branches are defined above all else by the rejection of the liturgical and ritual reforms enacted in the Russian Orthodox Church between 1653 and 1657, and by strict adherence to the Russian rite and traditions which preceded them. Instituted by Patriarch Nikon, the reforms were intended to eliminate all differences between the Russian use and that of the Greek Orthodox Churches: wherever a certain detail in local custom was found to diverge, it was corrected to resemble the parallel Greek one. The reform was not concerned with theology, and in this respect, there is no real difference between the Old Believers and the official Orthodox Church. It did touch upon numerous matters of form, totaling hundreds of pages in details.

Some of these changes are discernible and easily distinguish Old Believers from the "Nikonian" rite, as they term it. The best known, which became a symbol of contention, is the manner of crossing oneself: pre-reform Russian custom, retained by Old Believers, is to fold together the thumb, ring and little fingers, while holding the index and middle fingers upright, known as "crossing with two fingers"; the "new" rite is to fold the thumb, index and middle fingers together, in "three fingers". The priest (or the lay leader in the priestless communities) marks the sign of the cross like the congregants, with two fingers, while in the new rite the priest folds his fingers in a complex pattern symbolizing the initials of the name Jesus Christ. Old Believers recognize only baptism by triple full immersion, and eschew baptism by pouring, which is acceptable in the new rite; the symbol of the cross is always the eight-pointed Orthodox cross, not any other variant; the Alleluia after the psalmody is recited twice, not thrice; and during the Divine Liturgy, seven prosphora are served rather than five. The procession around the church is directed clockwise, not counter-clockwise. Old Believers perform numerous bows and prostrations, using a prayer mat called podruchik, mostly abandoned in the new rite.

Old Believers spell the name of Christ in Russian with a single I and not two, as Isus and not Iisus, and the name of the city Jerusalem as Ierosalim and not Ierusalim. The phrase "ages of ages" is rendered in the dative, veki vekom, and not in the genitive veki vekov, as in the new rite. In the Nicene Creed, the title "True", istinnago, precedes the words "Lord and Giver of Life", and the Kingdom "has no" (nest') rather than "shall have no (ne budet) end". Apart from those, there are countless liturgical and ritual differences, including the names of the saints and rulers mentioned during the Liturgy of Preparation, the wording of the Ektenia for the dead, and so forth.

Breaking with the official Church over the reform, the movement ignores all the innovations and decisions of Russian Orthodoxy since the mid-17th century. New saints canonized since, like Seraphim of Sarov, are not venerated by Old Believers, who have adopted new saints of their own, like Archpriest Avvakum. In the field of religious music, Old Believers retain the monophonic, unison Znamenny chant, which has its own distinct notation style, and do not employ the Part song imported to Russia from the Greek churches. In the field of icon painting, Old Believer artists carefully preserved the otherworldly style of the medieval Orthodox icon and eschewed Western-influenced realistic perspective or natural colours. Animalistic representations of the saints or certain styles of depicting Jesus, banned by the established church in 1722, continued to appear in the movement's icons. Old Believer clerical vestments do not include items of clothing that became fashionable since Nikon's time, like the Greek klobuk and kamilavka.

=== Traditionalism ===
The idealization and sanctification of the Russian past is an important pillar of Old Belief thought, buttressing their rejection of the reform. Old Muscovite culture was deeply religious and xenophobic, considering foreigners and foreign customs as barbarous and spiritually defiling. It was commonly believed that Russia was the sole bearer of authentic Christianity, after both Catholics and foreign Orthodox had fallen into heresy, Moscow being the Third and Last Rome. The 17th century schism marked the gradual opening of Russia to European influence, the secularization of society and acceptance of foreign customs, with the state dismissing the notion of "Third Rome". Old Believer polemics tend to portray the tsars, church and people of pre-schism Russia as living saintly lives of innocent devotion and simplicity, corrupted since and preserved only by themselves. The old rite, used by such illustrious figures, is therefore imbued with special holiness and nostalgia.

The movement rejected the westernization promoted since the time of Peter the Great. Old Believers cling to the Byzantine calendar, which he replaced by the Julian calendar. European clothing and hairstyles were frowned upon, and the old Russian garb was retained in marked contrast to urban society (peasants conserved the same style of dress until 1917). Old Believer men continued to wear untrimmed beards, embroidered shirts not tucked inside the trousers, and knee-long kaftan coats. Women kept the sleeveless sarafan dresses and the kokoshnik head covering, wearing their hair in a single braid before marriage and covering it afterwards. Though there is great regional divergence, the basics are the same. Even when modern clothing became more widespread among the adherents, traditional dress was obligatory at least during church services. Today, old garments are worn daily mostly in the rural and isolated settlements in Eastern Europe, and in the immigrant, highly traditional communities in the West.

All communities abjure men shaving their beards and the smoking of tobacco, two old Russian taboos which ceased to be observed widely during Peter's time. Many Old Believers also avoided potatoes, black tea, coffee and other foodstuffs imported in his reign, regarding them as "diabolical plants". Old Russian customs surrounding marriage, sex separation and other aspects of domestic life may be seen among rural Old Believers today. Suspicious of all new influences, the stricter sects of often avoided modern technology, and accommodated slowly to it. In the 1990s, an anthropologist who visited a community in Udmurtia noted that at first, it was not allowed to pray in a house that had electricity, later on electrical appliances had to be taken out and covered with cloth, and eventually the leader had a television set in his house. This traditionalism earned them both the reputation of primitive, backward obscurantists, and of authentic Russians preserving the essence of the nation's heritage.

=== Apocalypticism ===
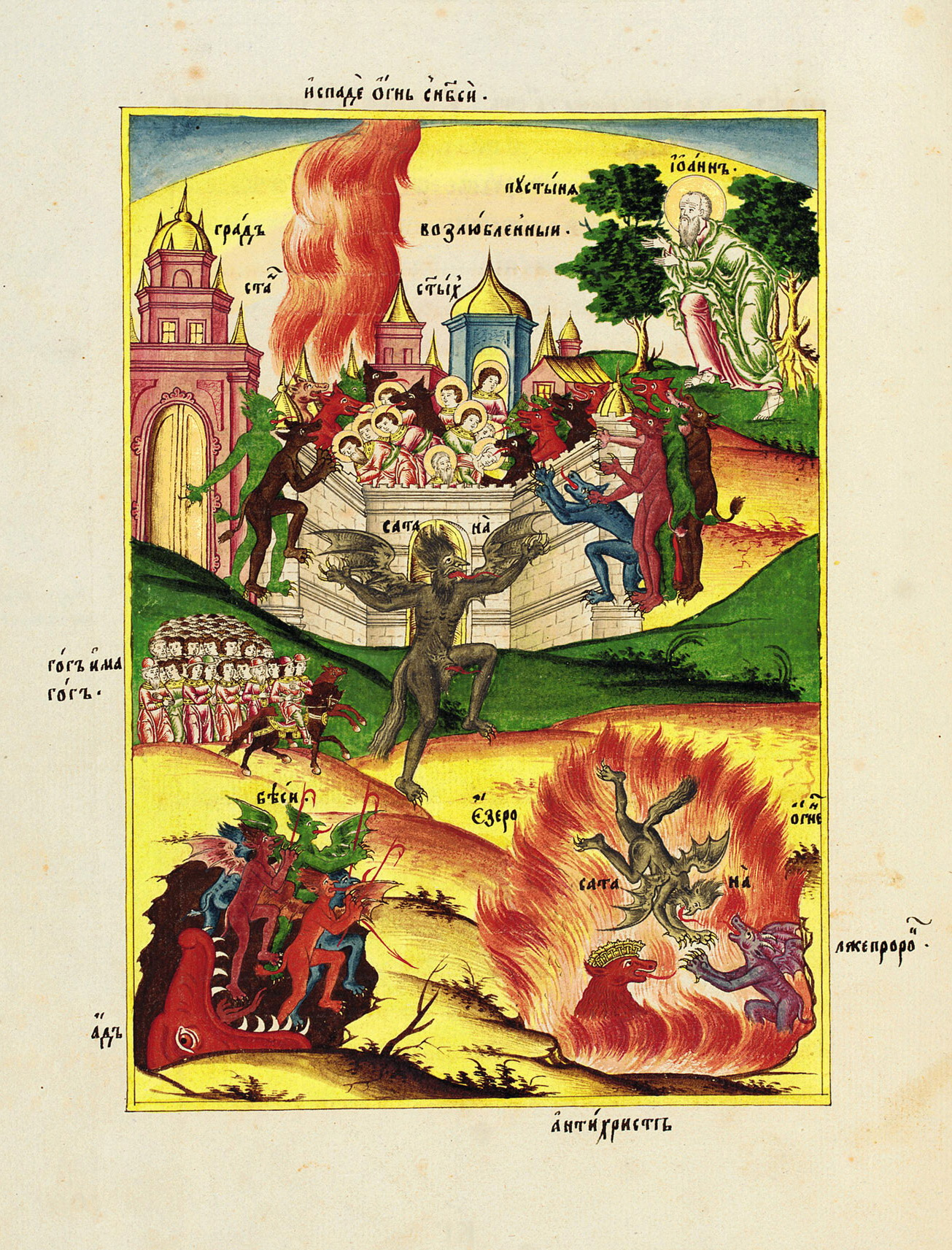
A leaflet from the Morozov Apocalypse, a Pomorian manuscript from circa 1820 commissioned by the prominent Morozov family, depicting a scene from Book of Revelation.

The 17th century opponents of Nikon's reform, considered as founding fathers by Old Believers, were convinced that the new ritual was Satan's machination, heralding the Last Judgment, and that they were living in the end times. Those accepting the "Nikonian" rite were deprived of true Christianity, and the Russian church and state, and the world at large, were ruled by Antichrist.

This eschatological current is deeply ingrained in Old Belief thought. There are two strains concerning the nature of the Antichrist: the "material" doctrine, more in line with conventional Christian theology, held him to be a specific person, who will appear at a determined moment and will fulfill the criteria set by scripture. The "spiritual" doctrine understood him to be an allegory for an evil presence permeating the world. These two concepts were not necessarily exclusive, and communities and thinkers could be flexible in applying them. The "spiritual" Antichrist is associated with the more radical sects, enabling them to justify extreme religious positions, explained as emergency measures for Armageddon, without a time limit. The "material" theory allowed the moderates to conduct themselves pragmatically in the present, as no person could be identified as Antichrist; but during the most zealous phases in the movement's history, the title was indeed applied to a specific individual, mostly Nikon, Tsar Alexis or Peter the Great.

The apocalyptic strain flowed in times of persecution and ebbed at times of tolerance but never perished. A willingness or eagerness to confront the corrupt world led to explosions of radicalism from time to time, most prominently to mass suicide, especially by self-immolation (quite often charismatic leaders murdered hesitant followers), conceived as martyrdom in the face of the Antichrist's dominion. A general distrust of the authorities permeates Old Belief, and the more radical sects forbade their members to serve in the army, carry official documents or even touch money, considered marked by the Antichrist's seal. In 1820, after half a century of official tolerance, a police search conducted in the respectable Old Believer merchants' quarter in Moscow, found a portrait of Tsar Alexander I with horns, a tail and the number 666 on his forehead. In the 1980s, an anthropologist visiting a small Old Believer settlement in Canada noted that residents were engaged in daily speculations concerning the identity of the Antichrist.

=== Piety ===
Old Believers understood themselves to be God's elect, chosen to preserve true Christianity in a fallen world. They separated from society, often living in secluded settlements, and practiced a regimen of strict morals and devout religiosity. Some radical sects adopted convoluted monastic-like codes, and promoted celibacy and asceticism. Old Believer services are long and involve meticulous preparation, and the many feasts and fasts of the liturgical calendar are carefully observed. Religious education and involvement were far more intense among Old Believers than in the average official Church parish: children were schooled to be proficient in Church Slavonic, making them able to read scripture and the prayer books, and the laity had a more active and developed role.

Old Believer communities were governed by severe sets of ethics, emphasizing moderation, abstinence, sobriety, hard work and mutual help. Secular entertainment and other worldly distractions were frowned upon if not forbidden. The relatively tight-knit community, even in the urban centers, and the experience of being a persecuted minority fostered a strong sense of internal solidarity, and of alienation from society. Community rules were enforced by the elders, and those failing to obey were subjected to penance, sanctions and finally excommunication. In the stricter sects, marriage to an outsider entailed excommunication, and outsiders wishing to join had to be re-baptized, as their first baptism was considered invalid. Those returning from sojourns in the outside world had to purify themselves by fasting and praying, before being fully re-admitted. Separate dishes were kept for the use of visiting "pagans".

Old Believers possessed a vast array of prohibitions, with many variations from sect to sect, which reinforced their separateness from ordinary Russians and other outsiders. Some were rooted in tradition or deduced from scripture, others appeared spontaneously. Adherents usually practiced strict hygiene and bathed often, and avoided vodka—in many rural communities, it was customary to display a full bottle of vodka at home, to signal it was left untouched (milder alcoholic beverages, like kvass and bragha, may be permitted). The stricter sects see liquids as particularly prone to defilement. In some, a drop from the baptismal font may require a chapel to be reconsecrated. They prohibit the eating of certain animals, and consider blood and bloodied meat as revolting and forbidden. These taboos ceased to be widely observed in Soviet times, and are maintained sparingly. In 1990s Udmurtia, in an otherwise flexible community, a person was excommunicated for watering a garden with a hose.

== Subdivisions ==
=== Accords ===
Disavowing the authority of the Russian Orthodox Church's hierarchy, Old Belief never possessed a centralized organization of its own. The movement was a loose network of disparate communities, which held to a certain sense of solidarity and common identity as a minority within a hostile environment, but cooperated only sporadically, and had little contact with each other.

The basic unit within Old Belief is known as the "accord", soglasie, referring to any number of communities which recognize the same spiritual authority and accept its decrees. The unique identities, histories and practices of many accords complicate any description of Old Belief as a movement, leading some historians to concentrate on separate treatments for each. Some accords had hundreds of thousands of members across all Russia, while others were confined to a single village. The lack of hierarchy, and the extreme seriousness with which Old Believers handled religious polemics, led to countless internal rifts, creating new subdivisions, or to the emergence of moderate and radical wings within the same accord, which adopted differing practices while maintaining strenuous relations. Many accords disappeared altogether, especially during the Stalin era, and others barely survive: of 30 that existed in the early 20th century, only 10 were still extant in the Soviet Union by the 1960s. Some consolidated into officially registered churches, which operate at the present. The chief division within Old Belief, hearkening to the dawn of the movement, is between the popovtsy, "priestly", who employ priests; and the bezpopovtsy, "priestless", who do not.

The division of priestly and priestless was not necessarily definitive. The Chasovennye (Chapelers), the largest accord in Siberia and the Urals, were originally priestly, but failed to recruit clerics for a prolonged time during the early 19th century. Faced with no choice, they began conducting services like the priestless, though they do not consider themselves as such. The Luzhkovites, a priestly sect that was adamant in its isolationism and hostility to government and society (refusing to register births and carry documents), did principally adopt a priestless orientation. Old Believer communities in the West emerged from a mixture of refugees that had lost their pre-Soviet affiliations, and were neither popovtsy nor bezpopovtsy in any strict sense. Among the Old Believers in Oregon and Alaska in the 1980s, many of the priestless' leaders decided to join a priestly denomination and to be ordained, leading to a local schism when some of their followers formed new communities.

=== Priestly ===
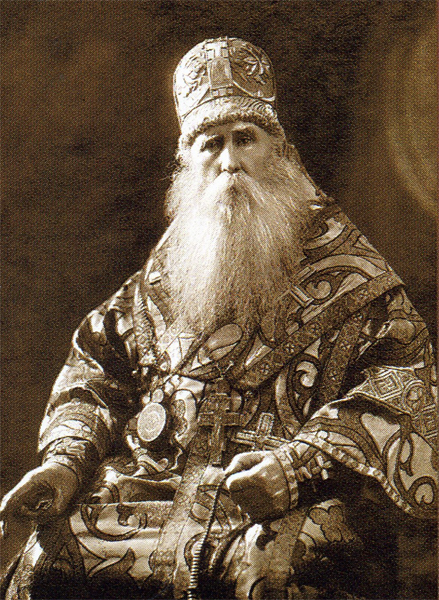
Metropolitan Meletius of the Russian Old-Rite Church, 1929.

The priestly (popovtsy) were generally the more conservative and moderate Old Believers. While regarding Nikon's reforms as a grave heresy, they did not believe the official church lost all divine grace or that its sacraments were null and void. No bishops supported their cause – priestly lore, seeking legitimacy, claimed that their movement was originally founded by Bishop Paul of Kolomna, an obscure figure who was supposedly executed by Nikon, and aggrandized in Old Believer hagiography. Lacking the means to ordain new priests, the popovtsy were content to accept unemployed or banished clerics from the official church, on condition that they abjure the reforms, undergo some form of "correction", mostly chrismation, and adopt the old rite. The priestly were thus able to maintain the full liturgy and much of the structure of pre-Schism church life. They were careful in applying the Antichrist doctrine to the present, and were seen by the authorities as less threatening. Their communities were relatively hierarchic, though the laity was nonetheless assertive and involved, often treating the "runaway" priests as mere employees.

Historical priestly accords include the Onufrites, who accepted some controversial letters written by Avvakum, containing unconventional theological statements, as legitimate; the Deaconites, who did not require their "runaway" priests to be chrismated (as preparing chrism without episcopal consecration is contrary to church canons), and accepted the four-pointed cross as legitimate, therefore swinging the thurible once horizontally and once vertically during services, and not twice horizontally as other sects; and the Sophontites, who chrismated priests, recognized only the eight-pointed cross, censing accordingly, and rejected Avvakum's controversial writings.

Since the mid-19th century, the priestly succeeded in recruiting bishops of their own, forming two separate Old Believer established hierarchies: the Belokrinitskaya Hierarchy in 1846, and the Novozybkov Hierarchy in 1923. Another settlement for some of the priestly was provided in the form of edinoverie, "uniate faith": since 1800, the state church allowed Old Believers to rejoin it while keeping their rites, although with various conditions. The edinoverie, that served mainly as a tool of the state to control Old Believers, never consisted of more than a small minority of them.

=== Priestless ===
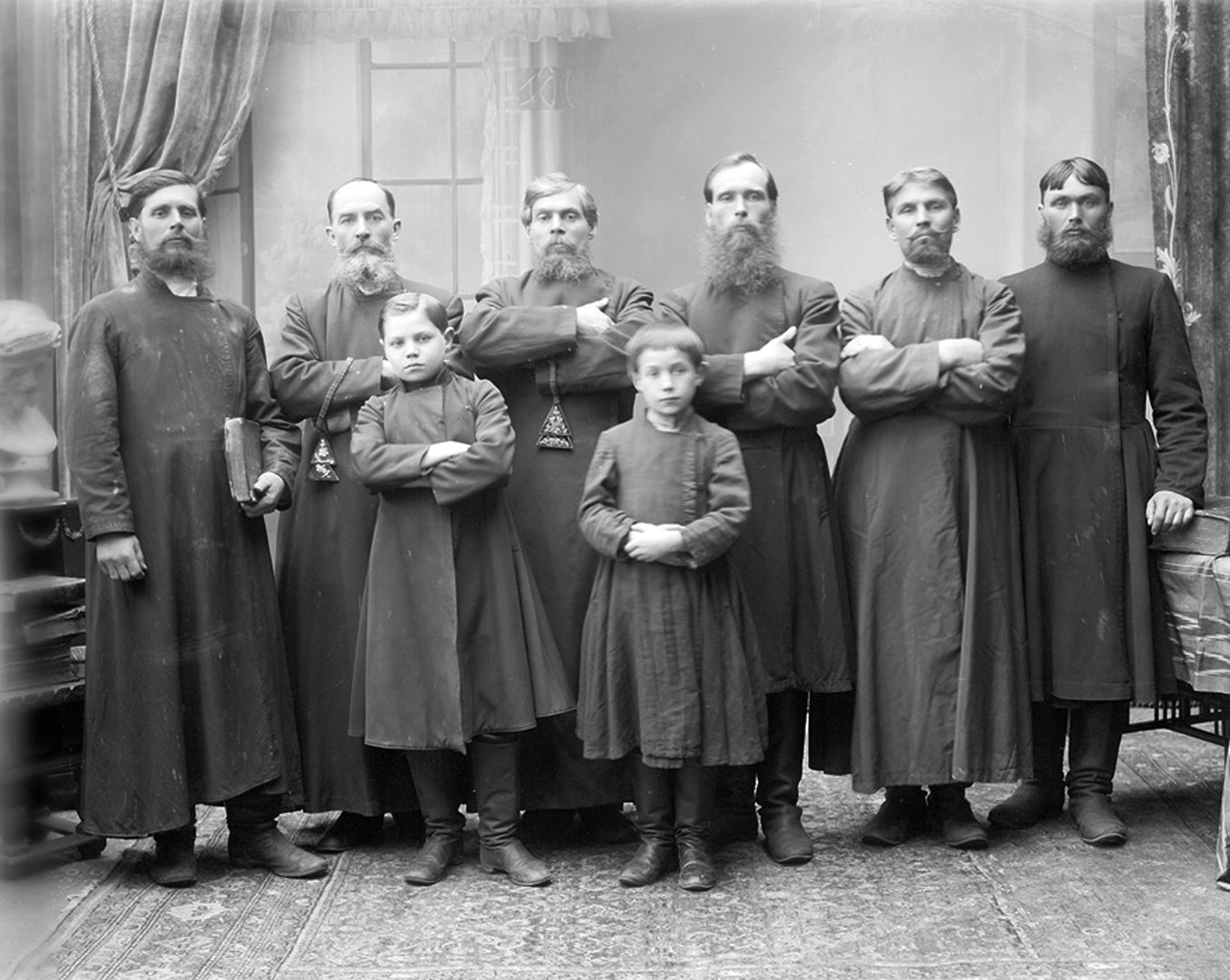
Members of the Pomorian accord, 19th century.

The priestless, or bezpopovtsy, were the radical wing of Old Belief. Having a stark and grim view of the world after the schism, they regarded the official church as hopelessly corrupted by the Antichrist, losing any access to divine grace. Only those bishops and priests that were ordained prior to the reform, according to the old rite, were legitimate. Condemned to live without a priesthood, the priestless had to forgo five of the seven commonly recognized sacraments, remaining only with Baptism and Penance, that the canons allowed the laity to conduct. Marriage and even the Eucharist were thus considered by the priestless as some of the "Old Things Passed Away" in the End Times; polemics about marriage, celibacy and sex caused much uproar in following generations. The priestly never in principle endorsed the loss of the sacraments and the priesthood, yearning for their restoration. Leadership was granted to lay leaders, known as nastavnik or nastoyatel. The priestless were especially prone to internal division and to radical religious creativity, and the role of the laity was exceptionally developed. Embracing the "spiritual" Antichrist doctrine, they were more hostile to the authorities and more distrustful of the outside world, re-baptizing converts who wished to join, and adopting harsh taboos concerning purity.

The major accords among the priestless included the Pomorians and the Theodosians. Both originated as monastic communities with strict codes which combined intense spirituality, hard labour and communal ownership of all property under abbot-like leaders. They preached isolation from the world of the Antichrist, distrust of the authorities, and celibacy, disagreeing originally on some finer points regarding couples who were married before joining. An ever-growing laity moderated their stances, allowing for non-sacramental marriage, family life and private property in most non-monastic communities.

There were numerous other smaller priestless accords, some barely documented. The Philipian sect broke with the Pomorians as they became too lenient for their taste, rigidly preserving the anti-societal attitudes of the priestless, endorsing self-immolation, refusing to pray for the Emperor, and condemning European clothing. The Spasovites argued that Baptism and Confession, like the other sacraments, were bereft of grace under the Antichrist, and only God's mercy could provide salvation. They split into several offshoots based on their exact practices following that conclusion: the Self-Baptizers insisted that all members perform non-sacramental baptism for themselves, and the Unbaptized avoided the ceremony altogether, in any form. The Beguny or Stranniki (Fugitives, Runaways) were the most radical priestless in their estrangement from society: a minority of fully initiated Fugitives lived as itinerant hermits, not touching money or possessing official documents, supported by lay believers. Rather than untenable celibacy or non-sacramental marriage, they allowed loose sexual morals, performing deathbed baptism that absolved of all sins.

The sect of the Melchizedekites permitted its members to perform lay Eucharist, claiming that Melchizedek's offering of bread and wine to Abraham demonstrated that it was permitted. The sredniki ("Wednesday-ers") claimed that Wednesday was the correct and rightful Sunday, due to an error in the calendar supposedly made during Peter the Great's reign, observing the Lord's Day and other festivals on Wednesday. The vozdykhantsi ("Sighers") sighed loudly and frequently during prayer meetings, to invoke the Holy Spirit.

=== Present-day ===
At the early 21st century, the largest Old Believer organization is the priestly Russian Orthodox Old-Rite Church (ROORC), which claims a million parishioners. It has 200 parishes in Russia and a few more abroad, in Kazakhstan, Kyrgyzstan, Moldova and Belarus, and two recent missionary endeavors in Uganda and Pakistan. Established in the 1850, when bishops of the Belokrinitskaya Hierarchy took posts in Russia, its headquarters is the Cathedral of the Intercession in Rogozhskoye Cemetery, Moscow, and its primate since 2005 is Metropolitan Cornelius Titov.

In 2022, following the Russian invasion of Ukraine, the Ukrainian diocese of the ROORC seceded and requested autocephaly, forming the Ukrainian Orthodox Old-Rite Church, which has 54 parishes and is headed by Archbishop Nikodim. Sharing the same hierarchy, the Lipovan Orthodox Old-Rite Church in Romania, headquartered in Brăila with Metropolitan Leontie as its primate, claims 35,000 members in 49 parishes.

The second branch of priestly Old Belief is the Russian Old-Orthodox Church, the separate hierarchy of which was formed in 1923, when Bishop Nikola (who was a member of the regime-sponsored opposition to Patriarch Tikhon) seceded from the Russian Orthodox Church. It had 100 registered parishes in Russia in 2018. The primate is Patriarch Alexander.

The edinoverie was revived by the Russian Orthodox Church (ROC) in 2000. As of 2021, there were 40 Old Believer parishes within the ROC. The Chair of the ROC commission for Old Believer parishes is Metropolitan Anthony.

The largest and oldest priestless denomination is the Pomorian Old-Orthodox Church (POOC), formally established in 1909, as a direct continuation of the old Pomorian accord which arose in the 1690s. Claiming 400,000 members, the POOC comprises seven national councils, with 200 parishes in Russia (less than half formally registered), 60 in Latvia, 27 in Lithuania, 15 in Estonia, 35 in Ukraine, 19 in Belarus and 4 in Poland. There are more in Kazakhstan, Kyrgyzstan, the United States, Brazil, Argentina, Sweden and Finland. The chair of the united international council of the POOC since 2022 is Grigory Boyarov, the former nastavnik of the Pomorians in Vilnius.

The small Old-Pomorian Old-Orthodox Church of Fedoseyan Confession, which united several established Theodosian communities, was formally registered in 2014. It had just 8 parishes in 2018, and is chaired by Konstantin Kozhev. Apart from that, there were scattered small communities of a few other priestless accords which surfaced in Russia in the 1990s, including the Philipians, the Spasovites and the Fugitives.

== Distribution ==
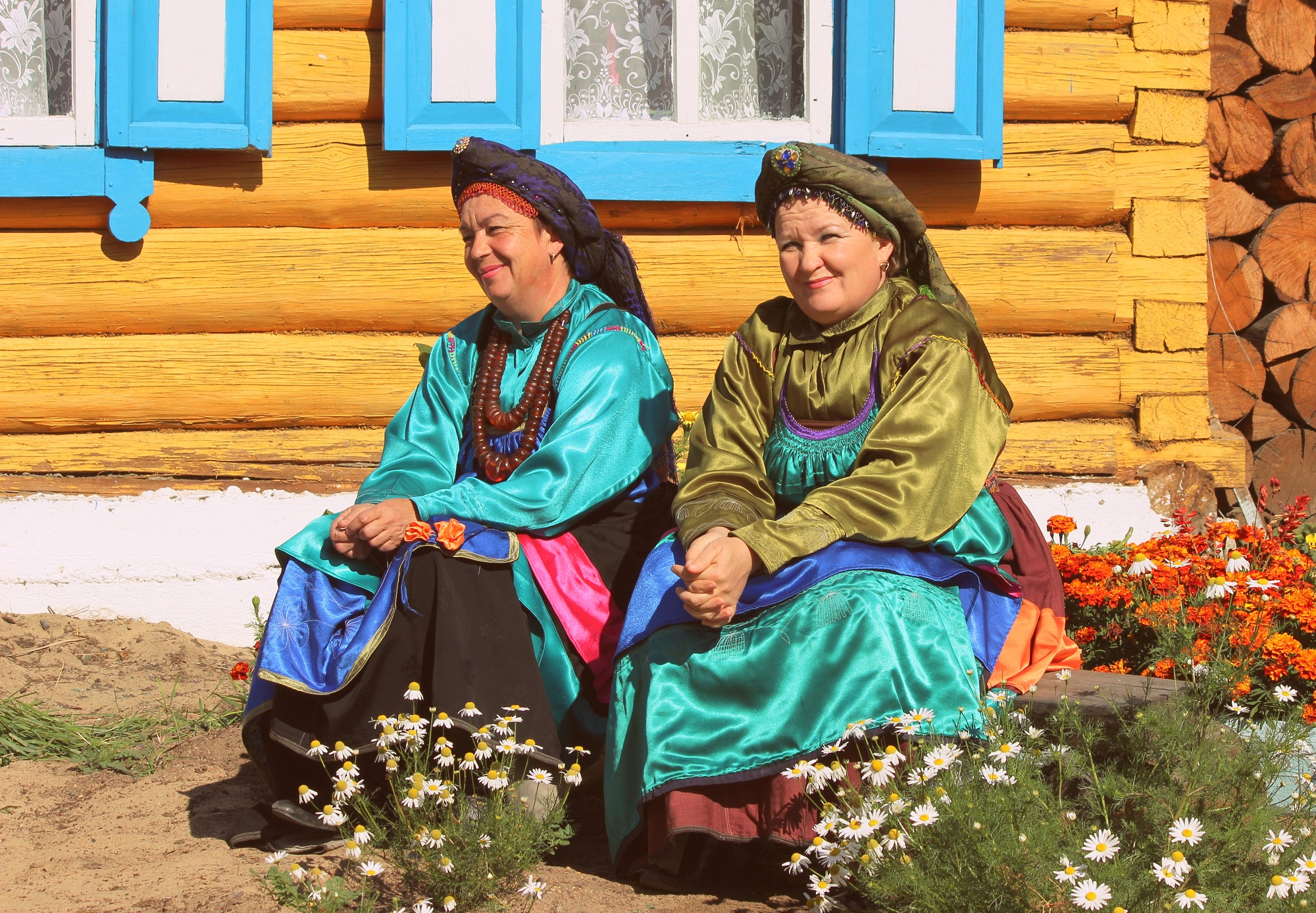
Old Believer women in Tarbagatay, Buryatia.

Old Believer communities often appeared in remote or inaccessible areas of Russia, as far as possible from the reach of the church and secular authorities, and from an early stage they tended to flee abroad. The original great centres were in the Kerzhenets basin near Nizhny Novgorod, the cities of Starodub on the Polish-Lithuanian border and Vetka just beyond it, the Don Cossacks' lands, and the harsh and frozen northern province of Karelia.

Flights from persecution, organized expulsions or government concessions, granting relative freedom in areas the tsars were keen to develop, led the Old Believers even farther. New concentrations arose in the industrial hubs of the Urals, Siberia and in the Samara and Saratov regions, and outside of Russia, in the modern-day Baltic states and Romania. Since the latter half of the 18th century, a time of tolerance for Old Believers, large urban communities emerged in all major cities of the Russian Empire. In Moscow, tens of thousands of priestly congregants were concentrated around the Rogozhskoye Cemetery compound, which virtually became the national headquarters of their movement, and an equally large priestless hub arose in the form of the Theodosian-led Preobrazhenskoye Cemetery. The Guslitsa region near Moscow was densely populated by priestly believers. The Grebenstchikov House of Prayer, Riga in Latvia is the largest continuously operating Old Rite chapel in the world.

In the 1897 Russian Empire census, the regions with the highest concentration of Old Believers were the Bogorodsky Uyezd (Guslitsa) of Moscow, Nizhny Novgorod, the Perm in the Urals, Saratov and the Samara governorates and the Don Host Oblast in the south, the Pskov and Novgorod in northern Russia, the northern Vitebsk area (Daugavpils county, Ludza county and Rēzekne county) in modern-day Latvia, and the Amur and Transbaikal in Siberia.

Some Old Believer communities, especially among non-Russian people, developed distinct ethnic features, with their own unique folklore, culture and traditions. The Lipovans of Romania and Moldova, whose ancestors fled Russia in the mid-18th century and settled in the Danube Delta, are a recognized national minority. Several ethnic groups from among the veteran settlers of Siberia, including the Kerzhaks, the Kamenschiks of the Altai Mountains, and the Semeiskie of Transbaikal, are all descended from Old Believers who either escaped or were expelled to the Russian Far East. The Nekrasov Cossacks, an Old Rite community of Don Cossacks, fled Russia and settled first in Bulgaria and then in Turkey, maintaining the traditions of their people. They were repatriated to Russia or immigrated to the West in the 20th century. During the Soviet period, a wave of immigrants escaping from Siberia and the Urals moved to Northern and Southern America and to Australia, forming highly traditional settlements in the West.

There are no reliable statistics concerning Old Believer population. Numbers, derived from Old Believer leaders' estimates, surveys and censuses, may vary greatly, and there are far less regular churchgoers than total members, who maintain some ties to the community. The Metropolinate of the ROORC claimed in 2018 that there are 2 million Old Believers of all accords worldwide. Estimates made in the 2010s cite 55,000 Old Believers in Latvia, 45,000 in Lithuania, and 15,000 (but only 3,000 regularly attending services) in Estonia, located mostly in and around of town Mustvee. In Romania, the local leadership stated it had some 35,000 members. There are tens of thousands of Old Believers in Ukraine and Belarus. In Armenia, Georgia, Azerbaijan, Kazakhstan and Kyrgyzstan there several thousands in numerous small settlements. In Poland and Bulgaria there are several hundreds each. In Canada there are several small settlements in Alberta, and in the United States, Old Believers reside mainly in Oregon (one estimate was that there were more than 10,000 around Woodburn), Alaska and in Erie, Pennsylvania. Old Believers also have a presence in South America; some 3,000 Old Believers reside in Brazil, Bolivia, Uruguay and Argentina. Small communities are also present in Sydney, Australia, and in South Island, New Zealand.

In Russia, a 2012 survey determined that there were about 400,000 self-professed Old Believers, with the highest concentrations being in the Smolensk Oblast, Perm Krai, Altai, Mari El, Komi Republic, Udmurtia and Mordovia, as well as the central Leningrad and Moscow districts. In 2017, the vice-chair of the Pomorian Church deduced that based on the average size of communities and the total number of parishes in Russia (about 800), a reasonable estimate concerning the number of Old Believers who maintain some ties to the faith in the country would be between 800,000 and 1,300,000.

== History ==
=== Schism ===
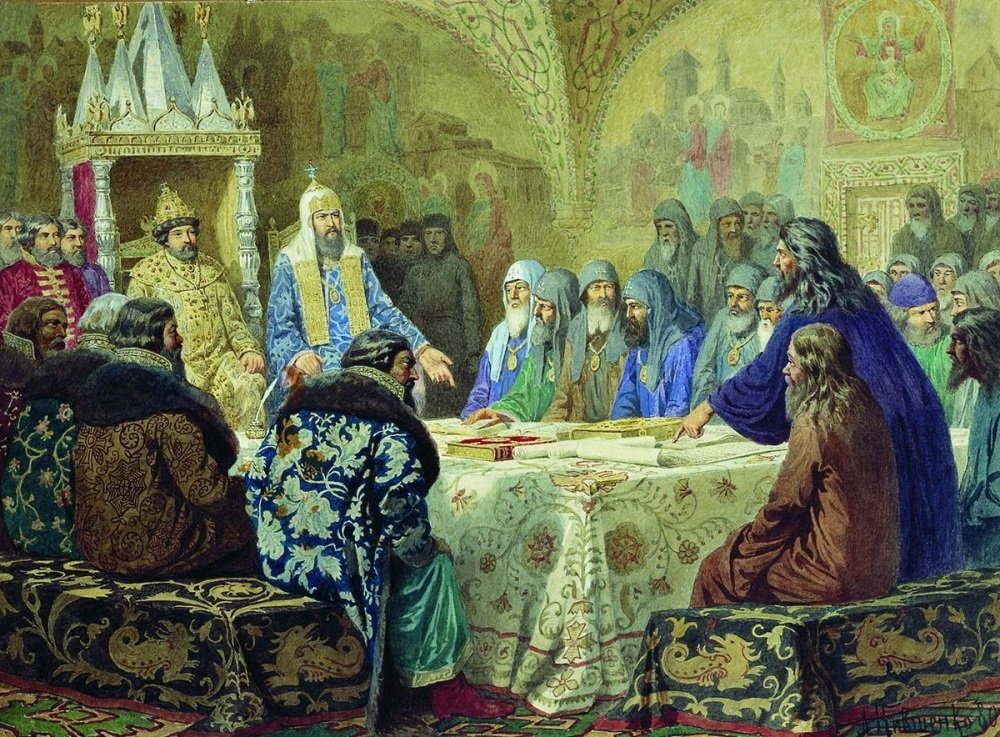
Patriarch Nikon and Tsar Alexis ordering the revision of liturgy. A painting by Aleksey Kivshenko.

Since the 1453 Fall of Constantinople—perceived as divine punishment for the Byzantine church's reunion with the Catholic Pope in 1439—the Russians deemed all foreign Orthodox as contaminated by heresy and themselves as the sole bearers of true Christianity. In 1551, the Stoglav Synod standardized and enshrined what its members deemed as the authentic Russian practices, like crossing oneself with two fingers or reciting a double Alleluia, and condemning the customs of three fingers and a triple Alleluia as foreign and therefore heretical.

With the end of the turbulent Time of Troubles in 1612, mass printing truly took root in Russia, motivating the church to produce standard service books—but also drawing heightened attention to the immense variance between the liturgical manuscripts, copied by oft semi-literate scribes for centuries, a problem acknowledged since before the Stoglav. Learned churchmen were assigned with identifying the original recensions of the texts. Woefully aware of the intellectual backwardness of their land when compared to the Greek or Ruthenian Orthodox scholars, in the 1640s they allowed the printing of some "western" works produced in Ukraine. Among them were apocalyptic miscellanies, containing texts written in response to the 1596 Union of Brest, under which most Ruthenian Orthodox bishops accepted the supremacy of the Pope. The union was interpreted by the authors as the Great Apostasy, heralding the End of Days which was to come in the symbolic date of 1666. As these works proved extremely popular, an apocalyptic fever gripped Muscovy. A radical sect headed by Elder Kapiton preached strict fasting habits, if not self-starvation, in preparation for the Eschaton.

Also in the 1640s, a party advocating religious reform arose within the church. Posthumously named the "Zealots of Piety", they deplored the ignorant and lax parish priesthood and the wanton and quasi-paganic folkways of the common people, demanding educated clerics who would promote Christian piety and morals. They sharply differentiated between the idyllic church of the true believers, composed of their followers, and the nominal church in reality. While the "Zealots" enjoyed support from the court, they were deeply unpopular. Those who served as secular priests, like Avvakum, and attempted to ban drinking, pagan festivals and fornication, were often lynched by crowds.

The young and devout Tsar Alexis, crowned in 1645, harbored an ambition of spreading Russian dominion over all the Orthodox in the world. Religious unity with them became desirable, after two centuries of relative isolationism. Alexis and his courtiers admired the intellectual prowess and ritual splendour of the Greek church, inviting Greek and Ruthenian scholars to Moscow. In 1652, Alexis appointed his confidant Nikon, a "Zealot", to serve as patriarch. Obeying the tsar's wish, Nikon immediately began to "correct" Russian ritual to resemble the Greek. He ordered foreign scholars to rewrite the prayer books "according to the ancient manuscripts"—in fact they mainly used a 1602 edition of the Euchologion printed in Venice; neither Greeks nor Russians had a concept of historical development in the liturgy—and introduced various other amendments. He also proved authoritarian and capricious, alienating most of the "Zealots" to the point of bitter hatred. In 1658, his relationship with Alexis deteriorated, and he withdrew to a monastery, not performing the functions of his office but refusing to appoint an heir.

At first, the reforms apparently drew little opposition: only prominent Zealot Ivan Neronov is conclusively recorded as voicing serious resistance in the early years. But around 1660, a circle of high-ranking churchmen, led by Archbishop Alexander of Vyatka, formed in rejection of the new rite. Their motives are not entirely clear, and it seems that most turned against the reform only after either quarrelling with Nikon or losing their lucrative positions in the 1660 purge of Nikon's supporters. Archimandrite Spiridon served as their chief scholar and theologian, and he and his associates produced a prolific set of writings. Apart from thoroughly critiquing the amendments and arguing for the old rite, citing also the Stoglav council and noting that if Muscovite custom was erroneous then all the righteous saints of the past were condemned, they formulated a radical theology in support of their cause. Combining the Zealots' notion of a true church of the elect, the apocalypticism of the Ukrainian miscellanies, and the sanctification of Muscovite tradition, they argued that Nikon's reform constituted the Great Apostasy before the Day of Judgment in 1666. The elect to be saved were those who would have rejected the Antichrist (whom they speculated might be Nikon) by remaining loyal to true Christianity, that is the old rite. The anti-reform circle gained considerable influence among the church hierarchy and the Moscow nobility.

In 1666, the exasperated tsar convened a general synod in Moscow to resolve the Nikon crisis and the controversy surrounding the new rite. At first, Alexis and his councilors sought consensus. The first sitting of Russian clerics, after deposing Nikon, voted to accept the "corrected" ritual without any reference to the traditional one. The intransigence of the anti-reformers angered Alexis. The second sitting, attended by foreign Greek hierarchs from the East, anathemized the old rite and its followers, declaring Russian custom (or at the very least those who followed it in rejection of the authority of the church) as heretical. The members of the opposition, facing the sovereign's wrath, buckled. Alexander, Neronov, Nikita Dobrynin, the late Spiridon's brother Efrem and most of their circle accepted the resolutions, denounced their former views and asked for forgiveness. Only four remained steadfast: Avvakum, Fyodor Ivanov, Epifany and Lazar. The latter two's tongues and fingers on the left hand were cut (Fyodor underwent the same punishment in 1670), and they were all exiled to Pustozersk, a penal colony in the Arctic Circle.

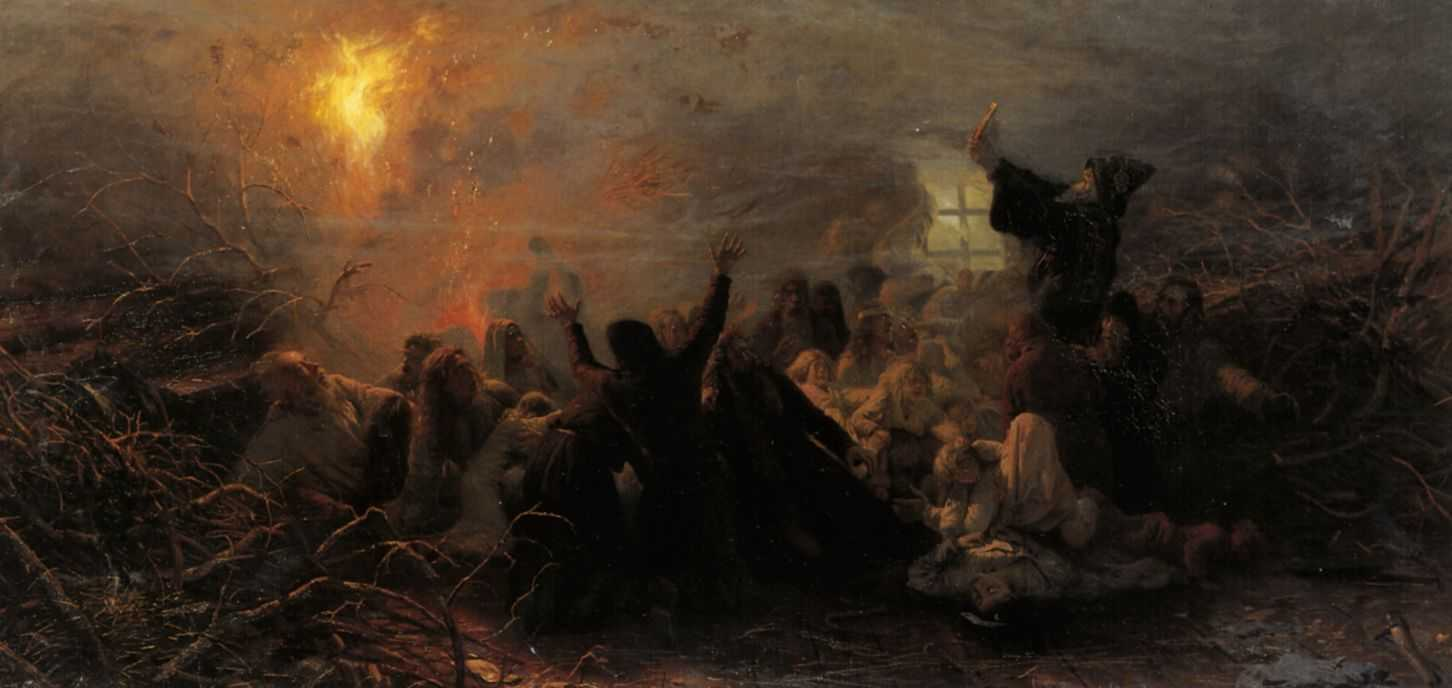
"Self-immolators" by Grigoriy Myasoyedov.

The church and the state embarked upon a campaign to enforce the synod's resolutions. In fact, the authority of the ecclesiastical hierarchy, little sensed in many areas, was now extended there for the first time, clashing with local customs and popular religion. The church dispersed unauthorized monastic communities, forced the oft hereditary parish priests to be formally ordained, and banished local charismatic holy men and women. This was but a part of the rise of a centralized bureaucracy in Russia, eliminating various autonomies and traditional arrangements; in 1649, the peasantry was virtually enserfed under a new code of law, the Sobornoye Ulozheniye. As the people proved recalcitrant, the church believed that it faced a coordinated opposition movement, which it termed "the Schism" or raskol in Russian, and set out to suppress it, fueling tensions even further. Church authorities conflated various "schismatic" behaviours (including such trivial phenomena as people who barely attended church and were oblivious of the amendments) with principled rejection of the new liturgy.

Religious concerns were sometimes intertwined, though not identical, with social ones: in 1670, malcontent Stenka Razin led the greatest revolt in the history of the nation until then. Deposed priests and monks, embittered by their travails, roamed the land, joining marauding bands of peasants fleeing enserfment and other destitutes, and served as their chaplains and ideologues of sorts—rejecting not the reform alone, but church authority in general. The "Schism" gave rise not only to what would become Old Belief, but also to the Khlysty and other radical sectarians. The anger and despair, and the very tangible fear of torture and execution, inflamed the apocalyptic fervour so common since the 1640s, leading to mass suicide. In the generation after 1667, perhaps 20,000 died by self-immolation, sometimes thousands at a time, as government troops caught up with local nonconformists, rebels and bandits. Many women and children were coerced to partake at the conflagrations, while the leaders responsible for their murder sometimes escaped.

The doctrine formulated by Spiridon's circle was preserved, due to the protection of several powerful Moscow noblewomen, led by boyarina Feodosia Morozova, an admirer of Avvakum. She sponsored a network of scholars, priests, monks and nuns who escaped state institutions. Led by the learned monk Avraami, scribes copied and edited the anti-reform polemics for the future. In Pustozersk, Avvakum and his fellow prisoners spent their incarceration in extensive debates about the proper conduct at the End of Days. Among other topics, they speculated about the nature of the Antichrist, whom some believed to be a spiritual presence and others a corporeal person. Morozova used her contacts to smuggle their writings out of jail, and these became authoritative sources for anti-reform activists. Avraami recalculated the date of the Eschaton, concluding that it will occur no later than in 1691. Other prominent members of the Moscow circle were nun Elena Khruscheva, who settled in Kaluga, and Abbot Dossifei, who traveled from northern Karelia to the Don Cossacks in the south. Avraami was burnt at the stake in 1672; Morozova, after having lost her influence at court, was starved to death in 1675.

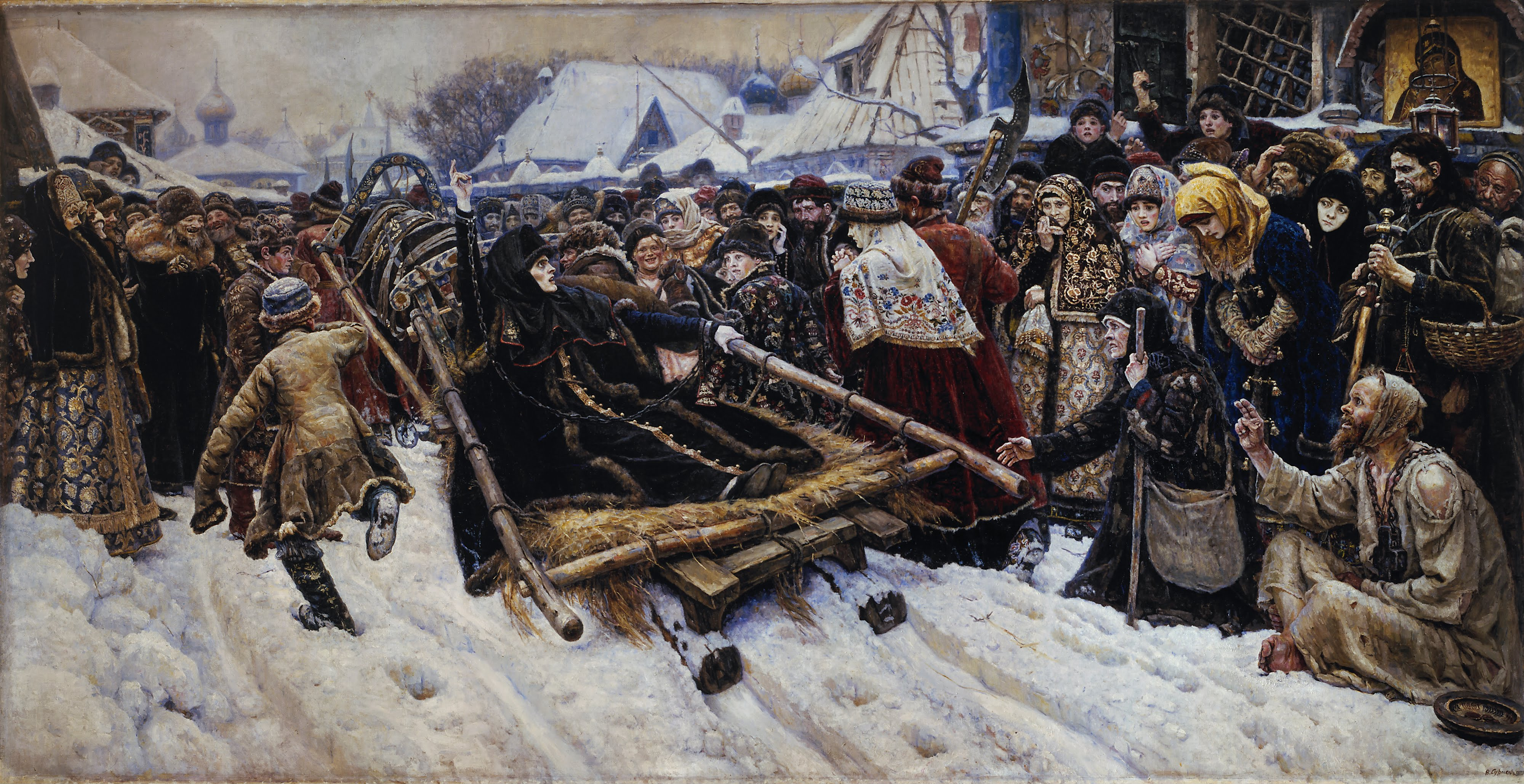
Boyaryna Morozova by Vasily Surikov. The Boyarina is holding two fingers when making the sign of the cross.

Another center of resistance was the northern Solovetsky Monastery, where rejection of the new rite was connected with insistence on the traditional autonomy of the abbey. After formally rejecting the decisions of the 1667 council and the abbot appointed by the Tsar (most preferred Nikanor, an associate of Alexander) the community was besieged. The defenders underwent considerable radicalization. They ceased praying for the ruler, and as priests became scarce, lay members conducted Penance and other rites by themselves, justifying their actions by the belief that the state church was devoid of grace and ruled by the Antichrist. In 1676, the walls were breached. Monks who escaped the massacre wandered the harsh northern regions of Russia, preaching unremittent hostility to the authorities.

On 14 April 1682, after Avvakum sent a strident letter to Tsar Feodor, the four Pustozersk prisoners were burnt at the stake. In June, following Feodor's death, the musketeers in Moscow rose in revolt, and anti-reform elements headed by Nikita Dobrynin emerged from the underground hoping to take advantage of the upheaval. Regent Sophia was forced to allow them an open debate with Patriarch Joachim. The Regent turned the mutineers to her side. Dobrynin was captured and executed, impressing upon the government an indelible connection between religious and political dissent. Sophia inaugurated the most brutal persecution of nonconformists, ordering the execution of anyone preaching sedition. Between 1686 and 1688, a Don Cossack colonel named Lavrenteev led a local revolt, with anti-reformers serving as his priests.

=== Formation of Old Belief ===
Apart from suicide, revolt or banditry, another path open to the dissenters was flight to the remotest regions of Russia, where the authorities were easier to avoid. Most importantly, the educated and pious keen on preserving the pre-Nikonite rite established monastic communities in these areas, allowing them to practice the ideals of saintly life.

In the 1670s and 1680s, a cluster of sketes and hermitages appeared around Starodub on the Polish border, and in the nearby island of Vetka. The recluses were members of Moscow's religious elite, often linked with Morozova's circle, and brought with them pre-reform artifacts and prayer books. The first dissenting priest to have settled near Starodub was Kuzma of Moscow, who is chronicled as bringing several dozens of his followers and fostering close relations with local Cossack colonels. Another concentration of sketes emerged in Kerzhenets, in the forested regions near Nizhny Novgorod. Its founding members may have been disciples of Neronov, who served as a parish priest in the area and gathered a small crowd who accepted the "Zealots"' preaching. A third cluster, consisting almost solely of hermitages, appeared in the north, on the White Sea coast (known as Pomor). The occupants were tonsured monks who survived the Solovetsky siege, like Korniliy and Pafnuti, and disciples they gathered. The hermits lived alone, but sometimes left their huts to lead bandit raids against the authorities. In one famous attack that took place in Pudozh, the raiders targeted the church, destroying any "Nikonite" item from prayer books to icons, and then reconsecrated the building and re-baptized the locals according to the old rite.

In 1689, Peter the Great deposed his sister, Regent Sophia, and began solidifying his reign. The young Tsar was imbued with a European spirit, and scorned the Russian people, whom he considered as backward and superstitious, in dire need of modernization. The persecution of "schismatics" seemed preposterous to him, and he was content to let them be, without amending the brutal laws enacted by his father Tsar Alexis and siblings.

In the 1690s, the final dates that the dissenters envisioned for the Last Judgement passed. As they grasped that the world did not end, their apocalyptic zeal receded. Mass self-immolations nearly ceased, and many of the advocates of self-inflicted martyrdom already perished by their own hand, leaving the field to their opponents. In 1691, the very year that Avraami believed would herald the End Times, the dissenter monk Efrosin wrote a treatise against suicide, arguing that it would leave none to preserve the true faith in a world which the Antichrist would rule for an undeterminable period. A new generation of young people, born to a reality in which the Nikonite reform was a long-established norm and not a radical innovation, reached maturity within the "schismatic" communities. They had to plan for the future – as the very future itself now seemed quite certain to come.

The most pressing issue which faced the dissenters was the aging and dying of their priests, ordained according to the old rite before the 1650s. As no living bishop joined their cause, new priests could not be consecrated. The nonconformists therefore faced the danger of losing the sacraments that could be performed solely by clerics, and much of religious life.

The southern communities, rather conservative in character, could not countenance this possibility. The elderly Abbot Dossifei, who fled as far southward as the Agrakhan Peninsula, is chronicled in dissenter literature as having accepted Joasaph, ordained by a bishop of the established church but supposedly according to the old rite, as a legitimate priest. It is noted that this act was controversial. Joasaph, with many other nonconformists escaping the authorities, crossed the Polish border and settled in Vetka. Some hardliners refused him at first, but upon the death of Kuzma and others, the large community entreated him to serve them.

After that, state-ordained priests who sought employment with the dissenters, willing to minister according to the pre-Nikonite customs, were gradually received in Vetka, having to undergo re-baptism at first, then being chrismated only. "Renegade" priests were also received in Kerzhenets. These were the beginnings of the priestly (popovtsy) movement, which was also known as the "runaway priests'" movement (beglopopovtsy). The details of the "correction" the new clerics were to undergo caused controversy from the beginning. As preparing chrism without the approval of a bishop was contrary to canon law, the followers of Deacon Alexander in Kerzhenets were content to have the "runaways" merely abjure the reforms. They were countered by Hieromonk Feodosii, who brewed oil by himself, claiming it was permitted by Bishop Paul of Kolomna—who was considered a proto-martyer to the dissenters, as he was supposedly executed by Nikon in 1656. Another solution was diluting true chrism, prepared years before and salvaged, with common oil. The question of chrismation and other controversies led to the formation of several subgroups, or "accords" as they would become known, in Kerzhenets: the Deaconites, the Sophontites and the Onufrites.

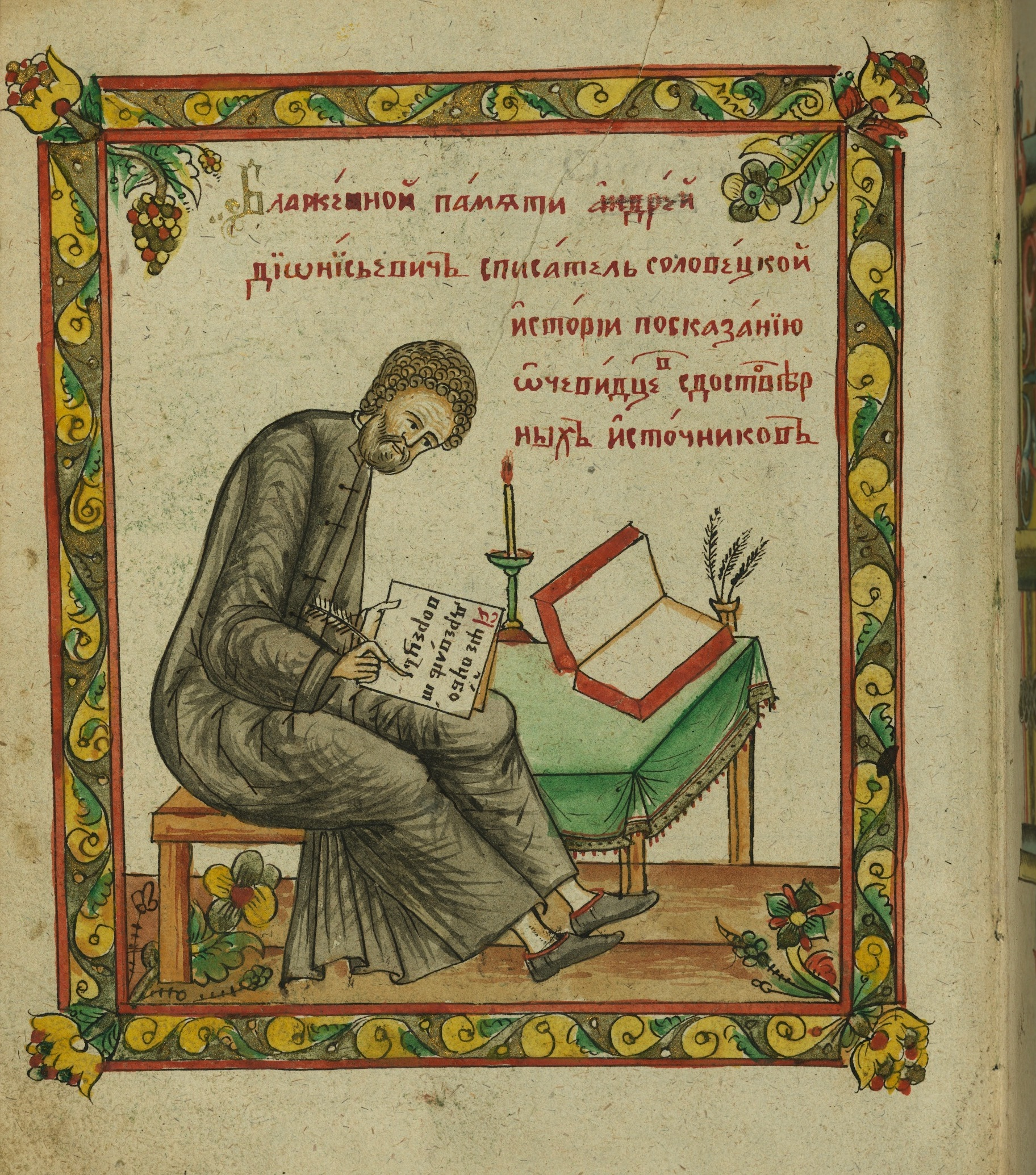
Andrei Denisov in the Scriptorium, a print from c. 1800.

In the north, the gradual dying of legitimate pre-schism priests elicited a different response. In the thinly populated lands between Novgorod, Pskov and Pomor, clerics were historically quite scarce, and people were accustomed to having little contact with the church. A sense of highly developed personal and communal autonomy permeated northern culture. in 1692 and 1694, the leaders of northern dissenters held two councils in Novgorod. They adopted the doctrine of the "spiritual" Antichrist, asserting that an evil presence corrupted the world, and that the official church had fallen away from God and was devoid of grace. Its sacraments were meaningless: those raised in the church and wishing to join their communities had to be re-baptized, and the ordination according to the new rite had no validity, closing any possibility of recruiting new priests from its ranks. The attendants of the Novgorod councils hoped for the future restoration of the priesthood and the sacraments, but had to conduct their communities without them, forming the basis of the "priestless" or bezpopovtsy. Upon the death of the ordained or tonsured elderly founders, leadership was to be handed over to laymen. Baptism and Penance could still be performed by them, but Eucharist, Matrimony and the others were lost for now. The stern leaders, who admired the legacy of the Solovetsky Monastery, adopted a strict code of celibacy, communal spiritual life, collective ownership of property, hard work and self-denial.

A local young man named Andrei Denisov, who became a recluse in 1691, encouraged the hermits in Pomor to gather in communal celebration of the feasts. In 1694, Elder Korniliy sanctioned the establishment of a male communal retreat on the bank of the Vyg river. Soon after, a convent opened on the bank of the nearby Leksa river. The Vyg community, numbering about forty people, became the spiritual center of the northern priestless movement. Elder Pafnutii, legitimizing Vyg's vision of being the heir of Solovetsky, served as the ceremonial figurehead, while the actual leader was the 42-year-old Daniil Vikulich.

In 1702, Peter and his entourage passed near Vyg. The monks filled the buildings with tar and straw and prepared to burn themselves, but suicide was averted. The Tsar was recruiting the local population to the metallurgical plants and mines he established on the North Sea coast. The residents of Vyg chose to enlist without protest or revolt, and received the governor's protection in return. It was the first time that a dissenter community dealt with the state in a pragmatic manner, eliciting consternation among the monks who believed that the monarchy was in thrall to the Antichrist.

During the same year, the hardliner Vikulich, who approved of self-immolation, was replaced by the 28-year-old and pragmatic Andrei Denisov. Supported by his brother Semen, Denisov proved both an administrator and a prolific homme de lettres, producing some 120 works by himself only. The Denisov brothers wrote spiritual guides, community rules, ethical works, polemics against the reformed church, and also the hagiographical history of their movement. Semen, in his widely received "Russian Vineyard" (Vingorad rossi'ski), compiled a narrative that presented the various opponents of Nikon as determined martyrs who opposed the reform from the very beginning. He ignored many of the early leaders who recanted in the 1667 synod, while embellishing the details concerning others, like Loggin of Murom, who were reputed to have died for the cause, although no historical evidence supports these claims. The Denisovs organized their haphazard community into the nucleus of a fully functioning counter-society, complete with institutions, historical consciousness and religious norms, standing against the larger Russian society.

A substantial urban community of the priestless, headed by Feodosii Vasil'ev, operated in Novgorod. Feodosii was at first aligned with the leadership of Vyg, but a dispute soon emerged. The decisions of the 1694 council mandated that married couples who joined the movement must divorce, but Vasil'ev believed this to be too strict. He advised that the "already-married" (starozheny) couples should remain wed, although he still espoused celibacy, and expected them to "live as brothers and sisters". In 1703 he left the retreat, and his community became an independent accord, the Theodosians; the followers of Vyg became the Pomorian accord.

The monastic dissenter communities, both priestly and priestless, were elitist and relatively small, consisting mostly of deeply religious and educated members. They became a mass movement only during the later reign of Peter. The Great Northern War and the ruler's other projects burdened the people with unprecedented high taxes and conscription levies. His European manners were strange and alienated many, more so when he crudely forced them upon the populace, ordering men to shave their beards and wear "German" clothes. Even among the clerics of the state church, he was widely believed to be the Antichrist. Many thousands of serfs and commoners escaping conscription and taxation fled to the edges of the empire. They often made contact with the dissenters, whose retreats were the most suitable for taking shelter.

After two decades of internal consolidation, the residents of the Vetka, Starodub, Kerzhenets and Vyg sketes were ready to propagate their traditionalist religion. The runaways, detached from their homes and communities, isolated, often deeply shocked by their travails and hostile to the established order, were just as ready to absorb it. They were placed under strict discipline, and made to attend schools administered by the monks, where they were diligently catechized, learning church Slavonic, scripture, the liturgy, Christian morals, as well as the anti-reform polemics and the apocalyptic miscellanies that became cornerstones of dissenter literature. Drunkards and troublemakers faced the threat of expulsion to the wilderness. The works of Spiridon, Avraami and others were copied en masse to serve the growing need; the number of such manuscripts from these years is vastly greater than before. The high religious culture of the intellectual centers was also imparted to the masses in simpler and more accessible forms: the martyrs of the schism, like Boyarina Morozova, became the focus of popular saints' cults, as the common people could empathize with their struggle against the state and imported foreign culture. Missionaries were dispatched from Vyg and Vetka to remote villages, far from the official church's attention, often hostile to the central government, and willing to receive educated and charismatic ministers.

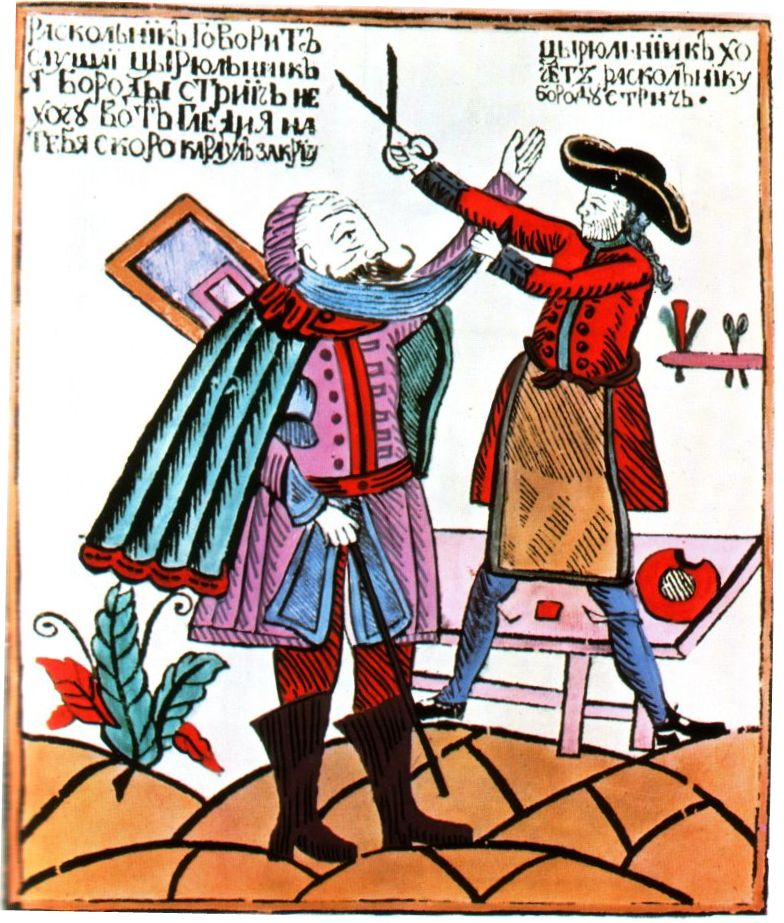
"A barber cutting the beard of a schismatic (raskolnik)", an 18th-century lubok.

From the 1720s, emissaries of the state church operating in the borderlands were aghast as they encountered peasants and artisans who were more learned than themselves, and who presented them with erudite arguments against the reformed liturgy. The monastic communities became centers of authority for much larger lay populations scattered across the country, supplying pre-reform prayer books and icons, teachers and ministers, moral guidance and religious instruction. The dissenters, who preferred to pay the high "beard tax" imposed by Peter and clung to the old garments, became a rallying point for many who detested the new Europeanized society. A century after the appearance of the "Zealots", their vision of turning the Russian villagers into pious Christians was finally fulfilled. At that time, both priestly and priestless began to apply unto themselves a common name, derived from a term sporadically used in the writings of Schism-era authors like Avvakum, but never before adopted collectively: Old Believers (starovery).

The emperor did not remain indifferent to the "Schismatics". His advisor Pitirim, a former dissenter who converted to state Orthodoxy, revealed to Peter the extent of hostility towards the state in their circles. The political and the religious could not be separated. From 1715, Peter enacted several laws aimed at isolating and eventually uprooting the Old Believers. He imposed on them a double poll tax and a copper medallion as a distinguishing badge. Baptism and matrimony were to be performed only in the official church, and the parents of baptized infants had to swear to raise them in the state religion. Priests who were bribed to forge attendance records, a common practice, were to be severely punished. Peter's edicts were only partially enforced, and most often, Old Believers throughout the empire continued to survive and avoid punishments as "semi-Schismatics" (poluraskolniki), a term coined by the state church to designate those publicly conforming to the minimal demands of official Orthodoxy. In reality, most ordinary Russians were not ardent followers of any of the sides of the Schism: studies of popular practice demonstrate a great degree of fluidity and blurring between both.

Pitirim, appointed bishop of Nizhny Novgorod, proved a zealous and effective enemy of the Old Believers, whom he estimated to have numbered roughly a half of his parishioners. He conducted public debates with their leaders and harassed the sketes at Kerzhenets, in which some 3,500 recluses resided. All but two were eventually dispersed. Pitirim claimed to have converted over 100,000 back to official Orthodoxy. Yet most of the Old Believers in the diocese once again chose flight to the Russian periphery, leaving their homes for the Urals and western Siberia, where they were relatively free to practice.

In 1719, the learned Deaconite Lisenin was preparing a detailed polemic in response to Pitirim's aggressive missionary campaign. In an act of priestly-priestless solidarity, he asked for help from Andrei Denisov, the foremost Old Believer scholar, in Vyg. Denisov edited and compiled the "Response of the Deaconites" (diakonov'e otvety), a list of answers to 130 questions posed by Pitirim. In 1723, the official church's emissary in Pomor, Neofit, began applying similar pressures. On 23 June, Denisov sent Neofit his conclusive treatise, the "Response of the Pomorians" (pomors'kie otvety), a list of 106 answers. The book was not particularly original, except in one point: it transformed the doctrine of "Third Rome", still sacred to the Old Believers but no longer to the state, and turned its focus from the monarchy and the sovereign to the common people and the saints, appropriating it for the movement's needs. Pomors'kie otvety distilled the faith and arguments of Old Believers of all shades, and was so formidable a rebuttal that it took the state church 20 years to author a response. It became canonical both among priestless and priestly.

=== Tolerance ===
In spite of unrelenting government persecution, the Old Believers steadily underwent routinization, drifting further and further from their anti-societal and anti-establishment origins. In a typical pattern common to religious revival movements undergoing institutionalization, the role of women in priestless communities was curtailed. The Leksa convent, at first enjoying great independence and run by its mother-superior, and attracting peasant women who refused to marry or sought divorce, was placed under tighter control by the male leaders in Vyg. If the early recensions of the hagiographies of Boyarina Morozova emphasized her courage and willingness to confront authority, manuscripts produced in the first quarter of the 18th century made her a more obedient and gentle figure.

In 1722, Peter ordered the army to swear fealty to his yet undetermined heir, after passing a decree that the emperor had a right to nominate any successor he chose. Dissenter monks in Tara, Siberia, convinced the local cossack regiment that the anonymous heir must be the Antichrist, whose name was secret, and they revolted. Loyal units massacred hundreds; some of the captured participants were drawn and quartered, some monks committed self-immolation and others blew themselves up with gunpowder. A year later, a council of the priestly leaders in Siberia decreed that their followers must honor the authorities and avoid any acts of disobedience.

In his "Response of the Pomorians", Andrei Denisov drew a fine line between nominal loyalty to the sovereign and his own religious convictions, heaping platitudes upon the monarchy, but never clearly stating that the emperor belonged to the true faith. The pragmatic Denisov attempted several times to convince the Vyg community to include prayers for the ruler in its liturgy, but they held to the legacy of Solovetsky, where the monks refused to pray for Tsar Alexis during the Schism, and refused.

In 1736, a former Old Believer apprehended by the police divulged that detail, and the authorities could no longer silently ignore the remote retreat, which was economically beneficial and bribed many officials. An armed delegation arrived in Vyg, frightening the locals and conducting searches and inquiries. The hardline elements, led by one named Philip, nearly convinced all monks and nuns to commit self-immolation, and in one building, twenty did burn themselves. In the face of immediate danger, Denisov carried the day, and a supplication for the emperor was added to their liturgy. Philip's followers were enraged, and seceded to form the Philipian accord, which garnered much popularity among Old Believers due to its uncompromising positions (in the early 20th century, there were more Philipians than Pomorians in the North Sea coastal region). Philip did finally burn himself, with fifty followers, in 1742, when troops approached his hideout.

Empress Elizabeth, who ascended the throne in 1741, was remarkably indifferent to the "schismatics", in contrast to the policy her father and predecessors pursued since 1715. The persecution of religious nonconformists gradually ceased. This very toleration confronted the Old Believers with dire questions concerning their place in the world, which their faith taught was ruled by the Antichrist. In the 1750s, a wave of mass self-immolations took place across Russia, from Siberia to Pomor. Though causing much fewer deaths than in the 1670s, they still shocked and terrified the government. The renunciation of the world, which was to be even more strictly pursued in a world that no longer persecuted the Old Believers, led a former soldier turned Philipian ascetic named Euthymius to establish the sect known as the "Fugitives" or "Runaways" (beguny), as he considered even the Philipians to be hypocrites who were too comfortable with the existing order. In the Russian tradition of wandering and Foolishness in Christ, the Fugitives refused to touch money or official documents, which they believed were marked by the Seal of the Antichrist, and lived as itinerant monks, supported by lay members who fed, clothed and provided for them.

Peter III was repulsed by the self-immolations. In 1761, his advisors found a solution: in any case in which suicide threats were raised, all those arrested were to be released immediately, and all involved were to be assured that no harm would come to them. Old Believer radicals could no longer claim that their deaths were acts of involuntary martyrdom in the face of persecution. Suicide incidents gradually declined, becoming very rare by the turn of the century, though they did not completely disappear.

Catherine the Great, crowned empress in 1762, maintained and expanded Peter III's policy of tolerance. Most secular ordinances discriminating against Old Believers were repealed: they were allowed to hold some public offices and to testify at court, the double tax was abolished, and even the pejorative term "schismatics" (raskolniki) was removed from official usage. The state church theologians, far removed from the ancient Orthodox identification of dogma with the minutiae of ritual that motivated both the anti-reformers and Nikon a century before, noted that there was no principled difference between their faith and that of the Old Believers, but only discrepancies of practice. Enlightened religious thinkers, most notably Platon Levshin, taking their cue from the government, concluded that both the church and the Old Believers were "of the same faith" (edinovery). As ritual was the dividing line, the "schismatic" label was replaced by the neutral and relatively inclusive "Old Ritualists" (staro'obryadtsy), which is the most common term in Russian for members of the movement ever since.

Many conforming dissenters, who attended state church services, began to practice their faith openly. The government invited those who fled abroad to return, and tens of thousands accepted. The number of officially registered Old Believers (actual numbers were much higher) doubled from 43,000 to 84,000 between 1764 and 1801. Catherine intended to utilize the returning dissenters as colonists in the frontier regions, bolstering ethnic Russian presence. They were only allowed to settle in the Belgorod, Saratov, Samara, Omsk and Tobolsk governorates. The empress was determined to bring the dissenters back to her realm by any means: in 1764, her army crossed the border into Poland and expelled the 20,000 inhabitants of Vetka, the greatest center of the priestly Old Believers, bringing it to an end. Many of them found a new home on the bank of the Bolshoy Irgiz river, between Samara and Saratov, where they received various privileges and exemptions from the state. A new concentration of sketes and hermitages rose in Irgiz, numbering close to 4,000 monks by 1828, becoming the new spiritual center of the priestly.

Old Belief became more urban with the softening of government attitudes. A large community appeared in Yekaterinburg, providing a hub connecting the Ural and Siberian dissenters. Rural Old Believers, often serfs who bought their freedom, moved to Moscow, Saint Petersburg and the other great cities of the empire, joining the merchants who already adhered to the Old Rite. But the main source of demographic growth was the abundance of former serfs, apprentices and other aspiring people of humble origins who found in Old Belief a stable community and a source of spiritual comfort in the urban environment. An ethos of industriousness, teetotalism and frugality propelled the poor and uneducated newcomers to prosperity, as they became artisans, merchants and workshop owners.

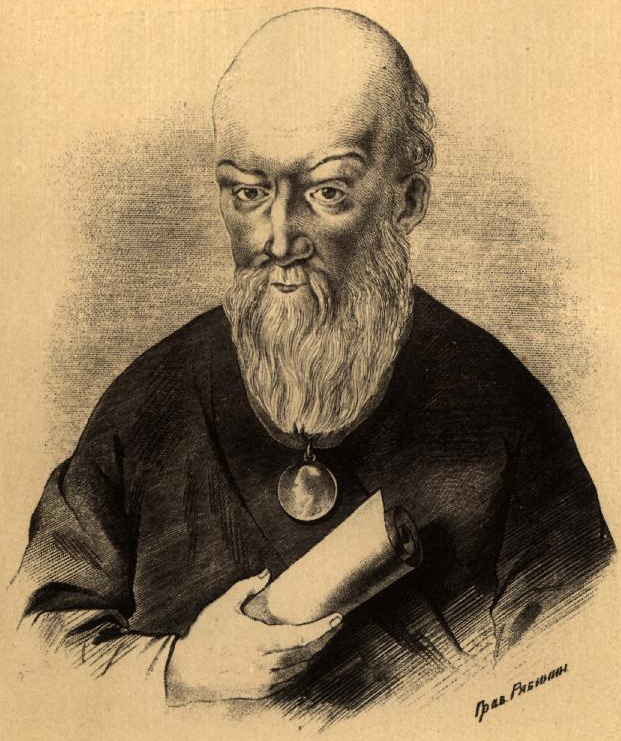
Il'ya Kovylin, the leader of the Moscow Theodosians from 1770 to 1809.

In 1771, a plague rampaged through Moscow, stirring a sense of religious hysteria. The government allowed the Old Believers to establish quarantine hospitals and cemeteries to help the populace. The Theodosian community, led by Il'ya Kovylin, formed the Preobrazhenskoye Cemetery, a compound which apart from its stated goals soon became the headquarters of the priestless in Moscow, housing monastic communities belonging to several accords, chapels and other institutions. The priestly in Moscow established the Rogozhskoye Cemetery, which housed five convents, two male monastic communities, several schools and three churches.

The urbanization, economic prosperity and tolerance led to a wave of liberalization among the priestless. A younger generation of mostly urban Pomorian thinkers claimed that the weakening of official Orthodoxy by the empress created a sufficient barrier between the heretical Nikonite church and the state, which could now be treated in a more neutral fashion, and command unhesitant loyalty. They delegated the apocalyptic aspect to a minor role within their worldview, turning it into a remote and obscure matter and allegorizing it: The nastavnik (minister) of the Moscow Pomorians, Vasilii Emel'ianov, claimed that the faith of the Old Believers had "nothing" to do with the Antichrist doctrine. Pavel Liubopytnyi, perhaps the most systematic liberal Pomorian thinker, imbibing the rationalist spirit of the age, argued that reason and worldly knowledge were God-given and should be applied in theology, and (echoing the perception of the official church and monarchy) that Old Believers clung to superstition due to their lack of education.

Urban Old Believers tended more and more to adopt the European dress of polite society, abandoning their traditional peasant-like garb, which functioned as a social marker and a symbol of defiance towards the Europeanized, un-Russian imperial order of things. The conservative Theodosian leaders, who were still loyal to the cause of social radicalism and bitterly rejected praying for the emperor, were powerless to stem the tide, as punishment and even temporary excommunication had their limits. The severe laws governing purity were greatly relaxed, in practice if not officially. Even penance, which was formerly a public act involving the community in the Russian medieval tradition, became a private and less rigorous procedure, and charity replaced prostrations and fasting. Social and religious radicalism in the mainstream (as much as this term could be applied) priestless accords receded also because the Philipians and Fugitives drew all the genuine fanatics.

The new circumstances drastically influenced the population reproduction profile of Old Belief communities. In the rural and monastic setting, the celibate sects were never short of runaway serfs and other discontents who fled conventional village life, and had a steady stream of people who were baptized in them, defied the ban on marriage (becoming "newly-wed" or novozheny) and were excommunicated, and then returned at old age. The children of such couples, who were deemed illegitimate and refused baptism as children, joined as adults, undergoing a technical conversion. Scandals involving relations between ostensibly-celibate men and women within the communities were rife, and ordinances banning leaders from hiring female servants were enacted repeatedly. These patterns could not be maintained in the cities, and more and more members openly defied the formal rules by marrying (via a folk or church ceremony) and raising a family, incurring penance and excommunication in a scale that threatened to destroy any semblance of communal authority.

In 1762, a former Theodosian turned Pomorian, Ivan Alexeev, authored a treatise, "The Mystery of Matrimony", advocating that the Pomorians should recognize marriage. He argued that the sanctity of the union derived not from the church or the priest, but "from the heart" and from mutual love, parental assent and communal recognition; it was not a sacrament. He regarded celibacy not as an obligation, but as a vocation, and its universal application as burdensome and prone to cause sin and aberrance. Alexeev was joined by Liubopytnyi and other liberal thinkers, launching a polemic that divided Pomorian ranks for an entire generation between "marriage advocates" (brachniki) and "anti-marriage advocates" (bezbrachniki). Vasilii Emel'ianov in Moscow bowed to public pressure, and conducted weddings in the community's Pokrov Chapel. The Vyg fathers excommunicated him and issued a renewed ban on marriage. Emel'ianov was supported by virtually all the urban Pomorian centres, while the rural communities and the traditionalists of St. Petersburg supported Vyg. The economic importance of the city dwellers proved decisive: Vyg was dependent on their financial support, just as the priestly Irgiz sketes were dependent on the urban Rogozhskoye. In 1798, the monastics accepted defeat, sanctioning the rite performed in Moscow, and the intra-Pomorian schism was healed. Even intermarriage with the state Orthodox was grudgingly countenanced. The bezbrachniki among the Pomorians were gradually sidelined, joining the Philipians or Theodosians during the following decades.

The Theodosians were likewise embroiled in the marriage controversy, as many of their members defected to the Pomorians. The accord had a strict tradition of being averse to any form of procreation and considering it defiling—midwives present at a birth were to undergo a lengthy purification involving 1000 prostrations. Kovylin firmly stood against performing non-sacramental marriage, but accommodated the pressures by greatly relaxing (or acknowledging community realities post factum) the sanctions placed upon family life. Couples who were married before conversion who gave birth to a third child were no longer permanently excommunicated, nor were those baptized as Theodosians who married. The children of the latter were accepted, rather than having to convert as adults. Technically, community-appointed godfathers were to raise the children of the novozheny, and the "newly-wedded" were to be separated from the rest of the community, but these obligations were formally met by having members of the same family eating together from different sets of dishes.

In 1776, presses in the Polish-Lithuanian Commonwealth (in Vilnius, Mogilev and other cities) began printing Old Believer books on a considerable scale, after a century of manual copying. Over 50 titles were out on the market within 5 years. Before that, only three service books were printed in small editions, starting in 1701. In 1785, in Klintsy near Starodub, the first Old Believer press in Russia began running. They were declared illegal by 1787, though it did not hamper their work to any serious degree. Old Believer books continued to be printed in Russia until the mid-1820s, and then again from the 1860s.

In 1781, priestly Old Believer Nikodim of Starodub concluded a prolonged journey during which he failed to recruit foreign Orthodox clerics for his sect. In September 1783, encouraged by the climate of official tolerance, he approached Prince Potemkin with a petition requesting that the government allocate priests to his fellow believers, and in exchange they would come under the control of the state church. Metropolitan Platon Levshin's assertion that the Old Believers were of the same faith and merely of a different rite was already well established among the ecclesiastical hierarchy, and they were willing to entertain the idea. The Old Believers and the state had very different goals in mind: the former envisioned a broad autonomy, the abolition of the 1667 anathemas, and an old-rite bishop of their own, while the latter mainly sought a control mechanism over the troublesome sect. Levshin formulated a list of 16 principles for re-admitting Old Belief communities, allowing them to keep their own rite, which he described as possessing "some sinfulness" albeit not deviating in dogma, without granting any legitimacy to it beyond their own parishes. He sought to ensure that the followers of the state church would be separated from the new converts, and would not be able to receive the sacraments from their priests, thus preventing any prospect of hemorrhaging. On 27 October 1800, Emperor Paul formally approved Levshin's sixteen articles, establishing the edinoverie, "of the same faith" or "uniate faith", within the Russian Orthodox Church as a framework for integrating old rite parishes. The edinoverie received little enthusiasm from its prospective converts: only 10 parishes joined it within the next twenty-five years.

=== The long 19th century ===
Following the Napoleonic Wars, reactionary tendencies set in in Europe, and particularly in Russia. The limited liberalism and enlightenment were swept away in favour of centralized autocracy. In 1816, a quarrel within the Moscow Theodosian community led one of the parties to appeal to the government, alerting it to the radical nature of the sect's teachings, especially to its opposition to child bearing. In 1820, Alexander I formed the Secret Committee for Schismatic Affairs, an extrajudicial body that was to deal with all matters related to Old Believers, as a massive government crackdown was undertaken.

The government classified the accords into three categories: the "most harmful" priestless of "democratic spirit" who did not pray for the Emperor and opposed marriage; the "harmful" priestless who prayed and married; and the "less harmful" priestly. None of them was to enjoy tolerance. While priestly clerics were permitted to lead services, they were punished if they performed weddings, which were to be undertaken only in the official church. Old Believer marriages were often dissolved, with converts to state Orthodoxy favoured in cases of litigation. The state allowed the priests to remain instated in the hope of pressuring the priestless to convert to the moderate sects, which in turn were to be assimilated into the edinoverie. Government coercion elicited mixed results: the uniate faith grew considerably, but remained a definite minority. No more than 350,000 Old Believers converted to it during the entire century.

Nicholas I, the autocratic successor of Alexander, was not motivated so much by religious concerns, but mainly regarded the Old Believers (as well as any dissident element in his empire) as not fitting in the strictly regimented Russian society. Thus, urban Old Believers, who were well adjusted, were mostly left alone on the individual level, and the Don Cossacks of the old rite were spared because of their military importance. But the almhouses and orphanages that served as an important source of new members were barred from raising foundlings beyond the age of three, and these were to be sent to state homes until the age of fifteen, when they were dispatched to the military. Merchants who did not convert to the edinoverie were not allowed to stay in Moscow.

In 1829, the local governor began a systematic campaign against the great priestly monastic center in Irgiz. All sketes were either to join the edinoverie or be dispersed. Hundreds of the recluses were arrested and sent to forced labour in Siberia, and by 1841 the governor met his objectives. In Vyg, the authorities launched a parallel action from 1836, checking the papers of all residents, bringing Orthodox villagers to dilute the Old Believer population and even having midwives check the virginity of the nuns in Leksa. By 1855, Vyg was virtually no more. Thus came the end of the great spiritual centres of Old Belief: while the monastic life still attracted many, the leadership was now concentrated in the hands of the wealthy urban elites. Some 250 Old Belief chapels were shut down across the nation. The Rogozhskoye and Preobrazhenskoye compounds suffered harassment and confiscations.

The repressions pushed the priestly leaders to a concerted effort to find a bishop of their own, who could secure a priesthood not dependent on imperial graces. Two monks, Pavel and Alympii, were sent on a journey throughout the Orthodox world. In 1847, they located a suitable candidate, the deposed Metropolitan Ambrose of Sarajevo, who agreed to help. He settled in Belokrynytsa, a village in Austria-Hungary with a sizeable Old Believer community, and began to ordain bishops and priests according to the old rite. The Ambrosian priests who crossed the border into Russia were not universally accepted, and many of the priestly doubted the Orthodoxy of the ordaining bishop, claiming that he was not duly baptized via triple immersion. The Rogozhskoye leaders lent their full support to the "Austrian" hierarchy, as it became known, swaying most. On 19 June 1850, Bishop Sophronius secretly celebrated the divine liturgy in Rogozhskoye, boosting the morale of those present.

In the wake of the liberal Revolutions of 1848, the imperial authorities were greatly troubled by the reports of a foreign-based church competing with the official Orthodox Church, and intensified their persecution. Inflated reports from local governors claimed that some 1,000,000 "schismatics" converted to edinoverie, while the initial estimate was that were only some 750,000 in all Russia. The befuddled Ministry of the Interior and other departments conducted an extensive study of Old Believer demographics in 1852–53, and alarmingly reported that there were over 10,000,000.

The persecution inflamed apocalyptic feelings among the priestly Old Believers, who were usually moderate on this matter. In 1862, several "Austrian" bishops authored a circular letter, announcing to their congregants that the state church worshipped the same God and Jesus as they (contradicting the growing claim that the double-lettered Iisus in the official creed was not the Isus of the Old Believers, but in fact the Antichrist). The circular letter caused much anger and protest among the laity, causing a rift between the "Circularists" (okruzhniki) who accepted it and the "non-Circularists" (neokruzhniki) who denounced it. Though the bishops withdrew the epistle from circulation, it was too late. In 1863, the non-Circularists elected their own Metropolitan, Anthony, founding a separate church.

Around mid-century, Russia underwent a belated capitalist surge, forming commercial banks, massive industry and other features of a modern economy. The thrifty ethos that made the patriarchs of urban Old Belief communities into merchants, turned their sons and grandsons into venture capitalists. The number of Old Believers in Russia's burgeoning new economic elite far exceeded their relative proportion within the population. The Morozov family, whose founding patriarch was an emancipated serf, became the fifth richest in the nation by the early 20th century, owning factories, banks and textile plants. Other prominent business families included the Ryabushinskis, the Soldatyonkovs and the Guchkovs. The latter's founder, former serf Fyodor Guchkov of the Theodosians, conducted himself as a holy fool and wore peasants' clothes, as befitting a conservative member of his accord. His grandson Alexander Guchkov was a leading politician. As the Old Believer capitalists were social climbers, having nothing to do with the traditional aristocracy, they did not share the conservative worldview of the Russian elite. They promoted and financed progressive causes, like liberal political parties and anti-establishment press, and many were patrons of the arts. Some of the more notable were Pavel Ryabushinsky, founder of the Progressive Party, and Savva Morozov, who funded the Russian Social Democratic Labour Party.

During the 1860s, under the emancipatory reign of Alexander II, government persecution eased somewhat. Old Believers were allowed a civil marriage, ending the threat to the legal status of families and heirs. Russian public opinion and a literary scene emerged from beneath the heavy-handed autocracy, perceiving the Old Believers very differently from their traditional depiction as primitive fanatics. Radicals and populists who objected to the rule of the emperor, saw them as an ancient model of grassroots democracy and communal autonomy, which resisted the encroachment of the authoritarian state. This view was formulated by historian Afanasy Shchapov, who dismissed the religious causes of the 17th century Schism, regarding it as a social protest against the power of the state. From the other side of the political aisle, reactionaries and nationalists also embraced the Old Believers. For intellectuals like Fyodor Dostoevsky, who believed in Russia's unique destiny and "soul" and despised the West, the dissenters represented a rejection of foreign influence in favour of an authentic Russian identity.

As socialism, anarchism and liberalism boiled within the empire in the 1890s, Nicholas II and his advisors considered granting the Old Believers and other Christian sectarians full religious freedom, seeing them as a conservative element that if placated could be harnessed in the service of autocracy. The arch-reactionary Konstantin Pobedonostsev blocked all such motions, regarding any dilution in the privilege of state Orthodoxy as a slippery slope. In 1905, a revolution erupted, threatening the very survival of the monarchy. Nicholas was left with little choice. On 17 April, Easter, he issued the decree "On the Strengthening of Religious Toleration". For the first time, Old Believers received complete equality: they were free to elect their own clergy, establish monasteries and churches, to unseal the chapels closed down in the time of persecution, and to publish and print religious literature. Proselytization by the state church was to be curtailed, and its adherents were now free to convert to Old Belief.

The 1905 decree led a short golden age for the movement. In 1906, a delegation of 120 Old Believer leaders of all accords met with the emperor in his Tsarskoye Selo residence. In the same year, most of the non-Circularists made peace with the Rogozhskoye priestly leadership, and the intra-"Austrian" schism was largely healed (though some bishops remained separate until the 1940s). The Pomorians, now registered as an official church organization, held their first all-Russian convocation in 1909. Old Believer intellectuals and entrepreneurs openly participated in the great debates of Russian public life; poet Nikolai Klyuev achieved fame, often alluding to his religious convictions. Ecclesiastical historians, no longer restrained by the favouritism shown before to official Orthodoxy, published new studies on the history of the Schism, vindicating many of the claims made by the anti-reformers against the Nikonite liturgy in the 17th century. Most prominently, Nikolay Kapterev, a professor at the Moscow Theological Seminary, demonstrated that the revised liturgy was based on then quite recent prayer books. The government's hope of enlisting the dissenters to support it was fulfilled somewhat, as intellectuals like Ivan Kirilov took conservative positions and argued for a reconciliation with the state church which no longer persecuted them, and for a joined combat for the soul of Russia against materialism and atheism. In 1917, the Great Synod of the Russian Orthodox Church discussed the revocation of the 1667 anathemas, but it was not carried through.

=== 1917–present ===
With the downfall of the monarchy, and the subsequent defeat of the "Whites" in the aftermath of the 1917 October Revolution, the Old Believers at first enjoyed a rather sympathetic attitude from the new Bolshevik government. The Communists, deriving their views from the radical discourse of the 19th century, regarded the dissenters as a popular democratic force hostile to the old order, and an ally against the now-disestablished Russian Orthodox Church. In the immediate years after the foundation of the Soviet Union, the authorities tended to support the Old Believers in any conflict they had with the ROC.

Since before the revolution, the priestly Old Believers who did not accept the Belokrinitsian hierarchy organized themselves into a united accord, and conducted negotiations to find a bishop of their own. In 1923, they located Bishop Nikola Pozdnev, who was a member of the Renovationists, an ROC reform movement in opposition to the Patriarch of Moscow, and on the verge of official defrocking. After confirming that he was baptized by triple immersion, the main point of contention that led their predecessors to reject Ambrose in the 1850s, the bishop underwent chrismation. Several other bishops of the ROC also joined. The accord's lay leaders declared that they considered the pre-Schism hierarchy restored. Thus, the Russian Old-Orthodox Church was established, and virtually all the priestly Old Believers possessed their own independent churches.

The government's goodwill evaporated around 1928, as the state sought to forcibly modernize the rural regions, which it regarded as backward and superstitious, applying a policy of collectivization. The industriousness of many Old Believers led them to be classified as kulaks, wealthy peasants whom the Bolsheviks wished to dispossess and "destroy as a class". Fully-fledged state atheism was also introduced.

The NKVD, the League of Militant Atheists and other party and state organs mobilized a campaign to root out the Old Believers. The Bolsheviks particularly targeted taboos concerning outward appearance that had to be observed publicly even when all other aspects of religious life went underground. In schools, youth groups, and workplaces men wearing beards and women wearing their hair long and braiding it were subject to systematic abuse, ridicule, and sanctions. Men did not dare to not shave lest their promotion be jeopardized and schoolgirls had their hair forcibly cut, supposedly to prevent lice. Party activists broke into homes, burning icons or cleaving them with axes. Priests, hermits, community elders, women considered possessed by spirits and other figures responsible for the transmission of religious identity and teaching were arrested, charged for shirking work, and sent to prison or work camps. By 1940, as many as 90% of all Old Believer houses of worship in several regions were shut down, and all but one of the 40 bishops of the Belokrinitsian Church were incarcerated. Some surviving monks from the dispersed retreats in the Urals secretly fled to the extremely remote Dubchess tributary of the Yenisei river in Siberia, forming a new abbey (they were only spotted from the air in 1951 and forcibly disbanded and arrested). The Lykov family of Old Believers fled their village to the Siberian taiga, spending the next fifty years in solitary existence in the wilderness. The large communities in the independent Baltic states enjoyed prosperity during the interbellum, but their occupation under the Molotov–Ribbentrop Pact brought the same Soviet conditions and persecution.

The immense social dislocation that took place during the collectivization, industrialization, mass famine, the Great Purge and World War II inflicted untold destruction upon the Old Believers. The easing of religious persecution by Stalin in 1941 was reversed by Khrushchev in 1958. Few of the numerous pre-revolutionary accords survived in the postwar Soviet Union, and those that were sufficiently large to merit government attention declared allegiance to the system and operated under its constraints. With few clerics or ministers, the preservation of communal traditions was entrusted to the elderly, who relied almost solely on their memory. They were relatively free to observe the rites and the old taboos without incurring sanctions, while their children and grandchildren sporadically participated in life cycle events like baptism and matrimony, and lived as ordinary Soviet citizens in all other respects. Soviet experts estimated that some million people partook in Old Believer religious life during the 1960s. Very few defied the new Antichrist as their predecessors did under the tsars: some recluses hid in the wilderness in the Komi ASSR, eluding the authorities for decades until dying naturally; an offshoot of the Fugitives pursued a radical rejection of the Soviet order not in the wild, but in the cities, where non-initiated benefactors hid them in their homes and provided for them. A few activists, like Ivan Zavoloko of Riga who spent 17 years in the Gulag, devoted themselves to preserving the heritage of the Old Believers.

Stalinist persecution led to a renewed flight in the early 1930s, this time outside the Soviet Union and into China. Several thousands of Old Believers who escaped the Urals and Soviet Central Asia settled in Xinjiang, and a larger community, originating in Eastern Siberia, formed in Harbin. The establishment of Communist rule in China after 1949 led them to seek a new refuge. International Christian organizations helped the Xinjiang and Harbin communities to evacuate to Hong Kong, from which they immigrated in small groups in the late 1950s, arriving in Brazil, Bolivia, Australia, the United States and Canada and forming small settlements. As the diminishing Old Believers community in Turkey faced the threat of inbreeding, most repatriated to the Soviet Union, but some joined their coreligionists in the West. The new centres formed by the Chinese evacuees, although not very significant demographically (they number few tens of thousands at most), preserved relatively much of the traditions of Old Belief, free from the drastic secularization in the USSR.

In 1971, the Russian Orthodox Church proclaimed the lifting of the anathemas placed upon the old rite in 1667. In 1974, at the behest of Aleksandr Solzhenitsyn, the Russian Orthodox Church Outside of Russia followed suit. Since the time of glasnost and the fall of the Soviet Union in 1991, the Old Believers are undergoing spiritual and cultural revival in Russia, the Baltic States and the other post-Soviet nations. In 2013, the liturgy according to the Old Rite was observed in the Uspenskiy Cathedral for the first time in 350 years. In 2020, Avvakum's 400th anniversary was officially commemorated in Russia.

== Bibliography ==
- Bushnell, John (2017). Russian Peasant Women Who Refused to Marry: Spasovite Old Believers in the 18th–19th Centuries. Indiana University Press. ISBN 9780253030139.
- Crummey, Robert O. (1970). The Old Believers & The World Of Antichrist: The Vyg Community & The Russian State, 1694-1855. University of Wisconsin Press. ISBN 9780299055608.
- Crummey, Robert O. (2006). "The Orthodox Church and the Schism". The Cambridge History of Russia: Part III - Russia Under the First Romanovs (1613–1689). Cambridge University Press. pp. 618–639. doi:10.1017/CHOL9780521812276.028. ISBN 978-1-139-05410-2.
- Crummey, Robert O. (2011). Old Believers in a Changing World. Northern Illinois University Press. ISBN 9780875806501.
- De Simone, Peter T. (2018). The Old Believers in Imperial Russia: Oppression, Opportunism and Religious Identity in Tsarist Moscow. I.B. Tauris. ISBN 9781838609535.
- Lane, Christel (1978). Christian Religion in the Soviet Union: a Sociological Study. SUNY Press. ISBN 9780873953276.
- Meyendorff, Paul (1991). Russia, Ritual, and Reform: The Liturgical Reforms of Nikon in the 17th Century. St Vladimir's Seminary Press. ISBN 9780881410907.
- Michels, Georg (1999). At War with the Church: Religious Dissent in Seventeenth-Century Russia. Stanford University Press. ISBN 9780804733588.
- Michels, Georg (2015). "From Persecuted Minority to Confessional Church: Some Thoughts on the Near Extinction and Ultimate Survival of Old Belief (1650s–1730s)". Canadian-American Slavic Studies. 49. Brill: 322–337. doi:10.1163/22102396-04902013.
- Paert, Irina (2003). Old Believers: Religious Dissent and Gender in Russia, 1760–1850. Manchester University Press. ISBN 0719063221.
- Paert, Irina (2004). "Memory and Survival in Stalin's Russia: Old Believers in the Urals during the 1930s–50s". On Living Through Soviet Russia. Routledge. pp. 195–213. doi:10.4324/9780203410790-12.
- Paert, Irina (2011). "Old Believers". The Encyclopedia of Eastern Orthodox Christianity. Wiley. pp. 418–420. doi:10.1002/9781444392555.ch15.
- Scheffel, David Z. (1991). In the Shadow of Antichrist: The Old Believers of Alberta. University of Toronto Press. ISBN 0921149735.
- Smirnov, Petr C. (1988). "Antichrist in Old Believer Teaching". The Modern Encyclopedia of Religions in Russia and the Soviet Union. Academic International Press. pp. 28–35.
- White, James (2020). Unity in Faith?: Edinoverie, Russian Orthodoxy, and Old Belief, 1800–1918. Indiana University Press. ISBN 9780253049711.
