= Fedoseevtsy =

The Fedoseevtsy, also Fedoseyans (Russian: федосеевцы, феодосиевцы, romanized: fedoseevtsy, feodosievtsy), sometimes anglicised as Theodosians, were a dissident religious movement formed in Imperial Russia that has become one of the denominations among the Bespopovtsy (the priestless Old Believers), along with the Pomortsy, the Wanderers and the Filippovtsy.

The movement was established in the 1690s in Novgorod. It was founded by the ex-deacon Feodosy Vasilyev (1661–1711) and originated by Old Believers (mostly peasants and inhabitants of posads) in Northwest Russia. The Fedoseevtsy disapproved of a certain group within the Bespopovtsy, namely the Pomortsy, who had been diverging from the strict principles of the Old Believers and adopted the custom of praying for the Tsar (моление за царя). Initially, the Fedoseevtsy were irreconcilable towards serfdom in Russia and observed strict asceticism by negating the institution of marriage.

By 1706, Vasilyev had announced a formal split from the Pomortsy although they continued to have good relations for the most part.

The group grew over time, and after Vasilyev’s death, members were to be found in Poland, Livonia and Wallachia, as well as Novgorod and Pskov.

In the late-18th century, the Fedoseevtsy centred on a group led by Ilya Kovylin (1731–1809) with its all-Russian "headquarters" at Preobrazhenskoye Cemetery, in Moscow. With the development of social inequality among the Fedoseevtsy, their doctrine gradually began to lose its elements of social protest. In 1848, they adopted the custom of praying for the Tsar. In the second half of the 19th century, a group of the so-called "newlyweds" (новожёны) detached itself from the movement and acknowledged the institution of marriage.

The Old-Pomorian Old-Orthodox Church of Fedoseyan Confession was established in 2014.
