= Pomorian Old-Orthodox Church =

Branch of the priestless faction of the Old Believers

The Pomorian Old Orthodox Church (Russian: Древлеправославная поморская церковь, romanized: Drevlepravoslavnaya pomorskaya tserkov), also known as the Pomortsy, Pomorian Church, Danilovtsy, Danilov's confession, or simply as Pomorians, is a branch of the priestless faction of the Old Believers, born of a schism within the Russian Orthodox Church in the late 17th century. They should not be confused with Pomors, who were inhabitants of the coast of the White Sea.

The Pomortsy (Russian: поморцы) were founded in Russian Karelia by the Vyg River (Russian: Выг), by Danila Vikulin and the Denisov brothers. Although it had existed earlier, it became an official registered organisation in 1909 after the Freedom of Religion Manifesto was published on April 17, 1905.

The Pomorian Church saw several schisms occur since its inception in 1694, including the split between Filippians and Fedoseyans, who refused to pray for the Tsar (моление за царя), and a major split during the 1800s between the Novopomortsy ("New Pomortsy"), who recognised marriage, and the Staropomortsy ("Old Pomortsy"), who refused to do so.

== History ==
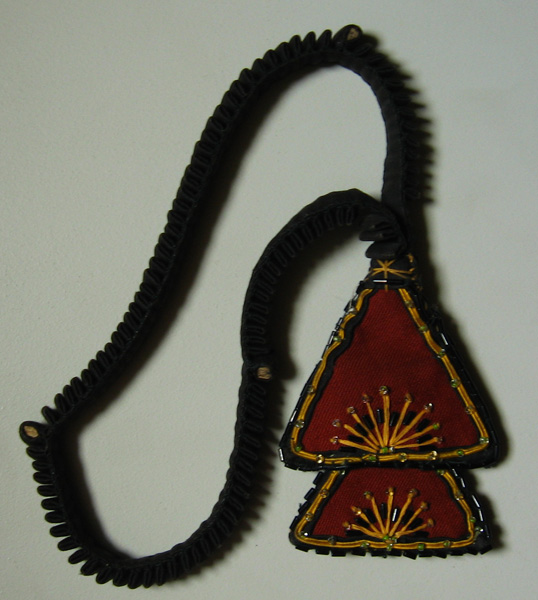
Pomorian lestovka

The Pomorian Soglasiye (Russian: Согласие, "creed" or "confession") is a group of bespopovtsy ("priestless") Old Believers, who abandoned the practice of receiving "runaway priests" after the death of the last priests from before the Russian Orthodox schism. In the absence of the Russian Orthodox Church priesthood, they began to elect literate laity to conduct services.

The Pomorian creed was formed in 1694, when the Vygovsky men's monastery (Vygovsky obschezhitelstvo) was founded in Pomorye by the Vyg River, which became the spiritual centre for the entire creed from the early 17th century to the mid-19th century and an ideological center for the priestless Old Believers. On the basis of Solovetsky Monastery's rules, the Pomorian service rules for the laity were created without words, which were given by priests.

In 1706, the Leksinskiy female monastery was founded. The Vygovsky monastery is famous for compiling its “Pomorian Answers”, which became the basis of its religious doctrine. In 1738, some Pomorians had started praying for the Tsar, which provoked a split in their community. Those that have not accepted praying for the Tsar (моление за царя) during their services formed the Filippovskiy (who also practiced self-immolation) and the Fedoseevtsy. Those groups also experienced subsequent additional divisions and splits.

Initially, the Pomortsy denied the sanctity of marriage. However, in the early 1830s, the Pomorian community became divided on the issue into Staropomortsy (Old Pomorians), who continued to deny the sanctity of marriage, and the Novopomortsy (New-Pomorians), who allowed the transfer of property by inheritance and marital relations outside church marriage. The Novopomortsy also attracted members from other Old Believer groups that were disgruntled with the strict attitude towards marriage.

The official church registered with the government as a church organisation after the Freedom of Religion Manifesto was published on April 17, 1905. The first All-Russian Pomorian Council was held from May 1–10, 1909 in Moscow and the second in 1912. Local communities of Pomorians also became important economic centeres of Northern Russia in the early 19th century.

After the 1917 Russian Revolution, Pomorians outside Russia have formed organizational centres in their countries of residence. In 1925, the Supreme Old Believers Council was established in Vilnius (Vilno), Lithuania. After Lithuania was annexed by the Soviet Union, the church body was not closed by the authorities, which marked the beginning of the legalisation of the priestless Old Believers branch in the Soviet Union. The Council became the governing body of the Pomorian Old-Orthodox Church throughout the Soviet Union.

== Organizations ==
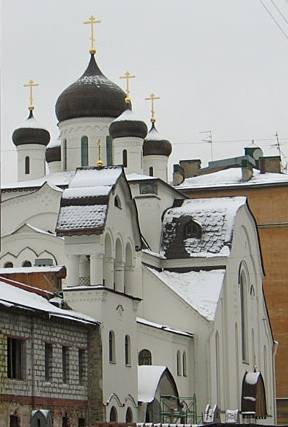
The Church of Our Lady of the Sign of Old Believers (of the New-Pomorian Confession), St. Petersburg, Russia.

The Pomorian Old Orthodox Churches are headed by National Councils and Spiritual Commissions in Russia, Lithuania, Latvia, Estonia, Poland, Belarus and Ukraine. There are also Pomorian parishes in the United States, Brazil and elsewhere. According to 2001 data, there are in Lithuania over 27,000 Old Believers in 59 officially-registered parishes of the Pomorian Church. According to 2021 data, there are in Latvia 65 officially-registered parishes of the Pomorian Church.

- Russian Council of the Pomorian Old-Orthodox Church (Russian: Российский Совет Древлеправославной Поморской Церкви)

Chairman - Vladimir Viktorovich Shamarin (since March 2018)

- Supreme Council of the Pomorian Old-Orthodox Church of Lithuania (Russian: Высший Совет Древлеправославной Поморской Церкви Литвы)

Chairman - Grigory Boyarov (since February 2007)

- Central Council of the Pomorian Old-Orthodox Church of Latvia (Russian: Центральный Совет Древлеправославной Поморской церкви Латвии)

acting Chairman - John Zhilko (since 2021)

- Union of Old Believer Parishes in Estonia (Russian: Союз старообрядческих приходов Эстонии)

Chairman - Paul G. Varunin (since 1998)

- Supreme Council of the Eastern Old-Rite Church, a.k.a. Pomorian Old-Orthodox Churches in the Republic of Poland (Russian: Высший Совет Восточной Старообрядческой Церкви в Польской Республике)

Chairman - Mieczyslaw Terent'evich Kaplans (since July 2006)

- Central Council of the Pomorian Old-Orthodox Churches of the Republic of Belarus (Russian: Центральный Совет Древлеправославной Поморской Церкви в Республике Беларусь)

Chairman - Alexander Belov (since October 2010)

- Central Council of the Pomorian Old-Orthodox Churches of Ukraine (Russian: Центрального Совета Древлеправославная Поморская Церкови Украины)

Chairman - Nicola Venediktovich Babichev (since May 2003)

- Conference of Old Believer Communities in the USA (Russian: Конференция старообрядческих общин в США)

== See also ==
- Pomors
- Filippians
- Fedoseevtsy
- Old Believers
- Russian Orthodox Church
