= Paul-Albert Girard =

French painter

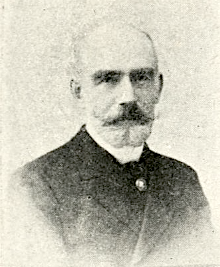
- Born: 1839; France
- Died: 1920 (aged 80–81)
- Education: École des Beaux-Arts, Paris
- Known for: Painter
- Movement: Orientalist
- Awards: Chevalier de la Légion d'Honneur

Paul-Albert Girard (1839–1920) was a French painter. Although he painted portraits and landscapes, he is best known as an Orientalist painter of North African scenes.

== Life and career ==
The son of painter Pierre Girard, Albert studied at the École des Beaux-Arts from 1857 under Jean-Joseph Bellel.

His work was exhibited at the Salon from 1859 to 1913, at the Dijon Salon from 1887 to 1910, and at the Salon des peintres orientalistes. He won the Prix de Rome in 1861 for the category 'paysage historique' (Historic landscapes) for his painting entitled, The Procession of Silenus.

His oil painting Ritual Slaying of Cockerels (pictured) is in the collection of Birmingham Museum and Art Gallery.

Girard was made a Chevalier de la Légion d'Honneur in 1895.

== Gallery ==
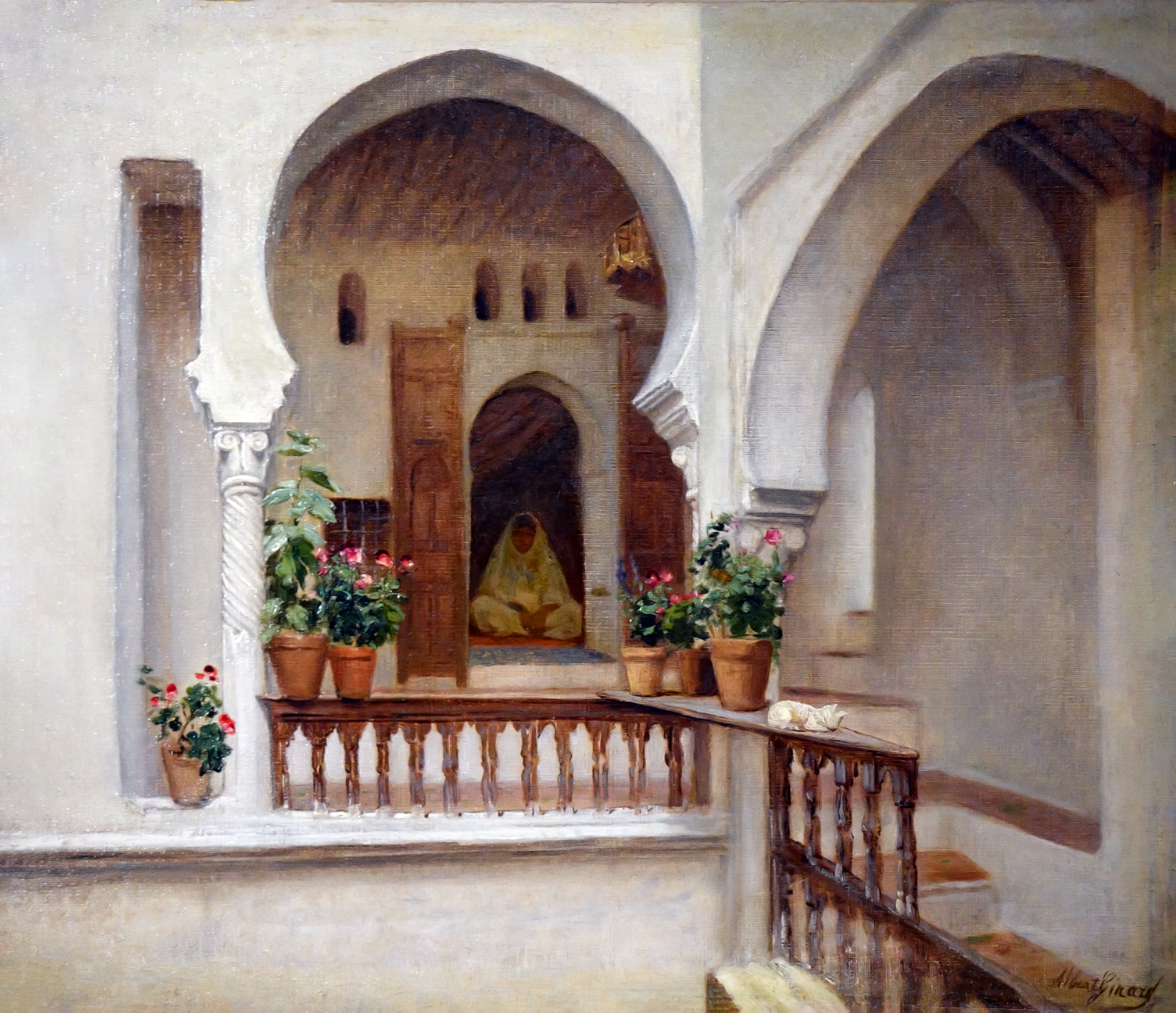
Femme dans un intérieur à Alger - Musée des Beaux-Arts de Narbonne

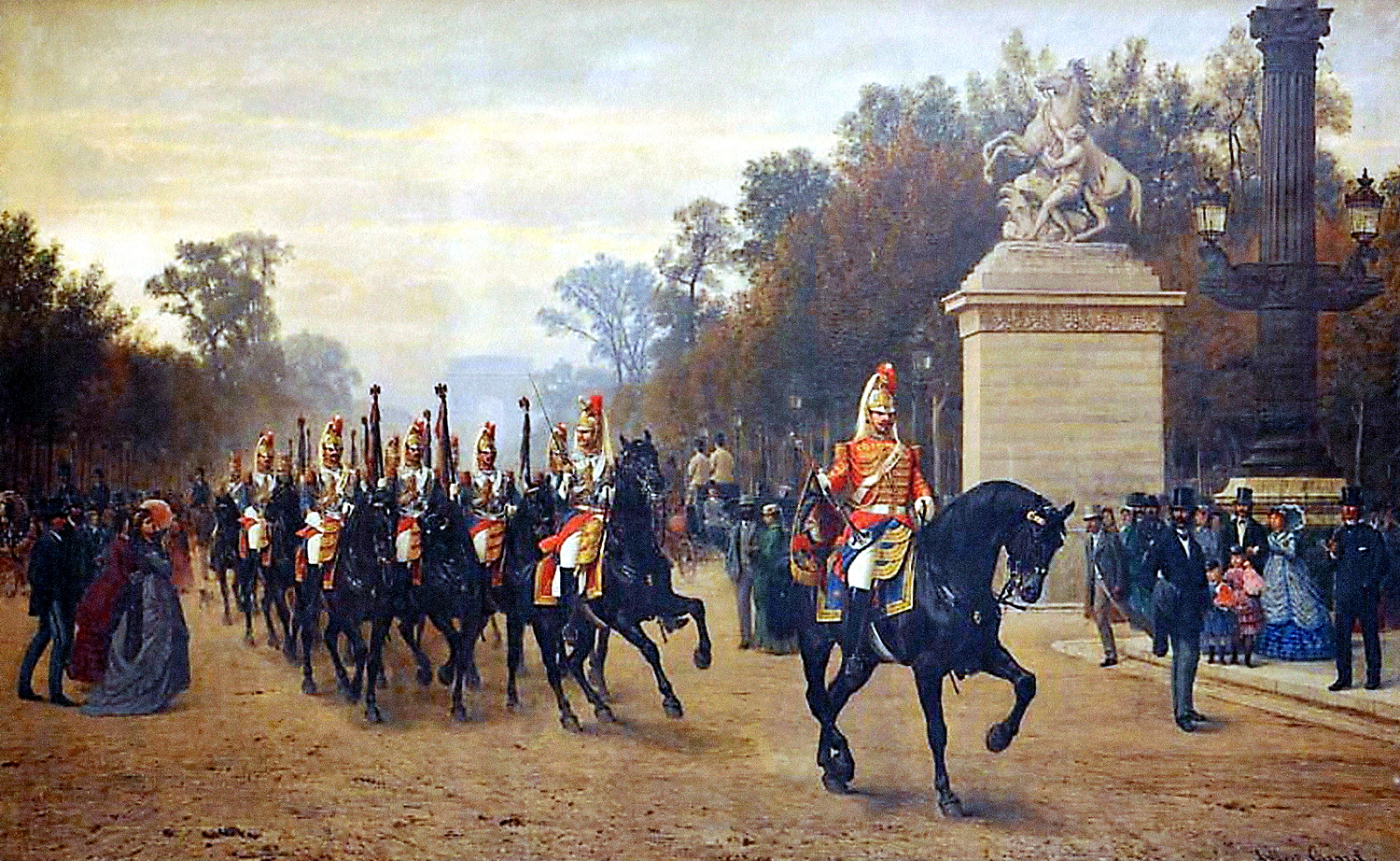
Défilé des Cent gardes

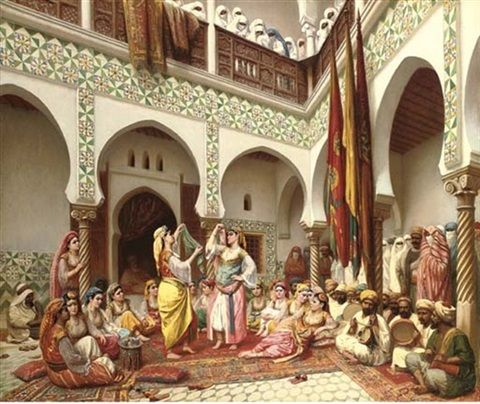
Entertainment in an Algerian House

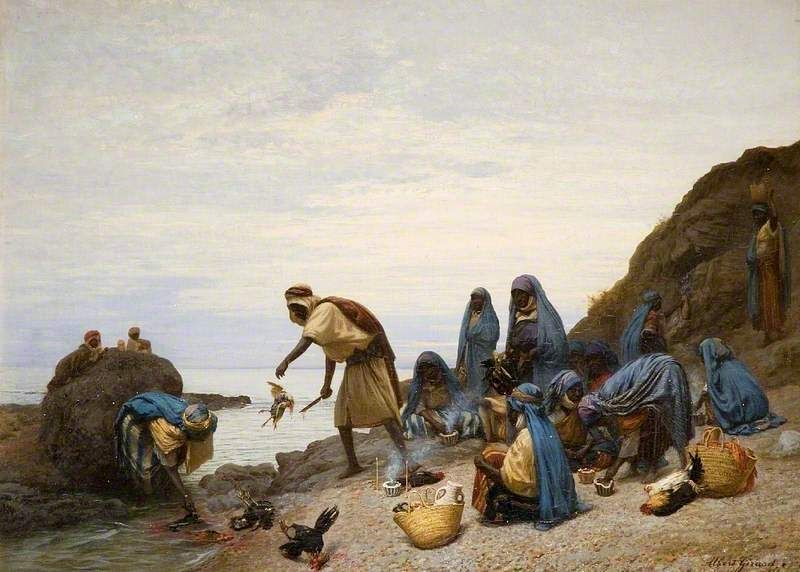
Ritual Slaying of the Cockerels

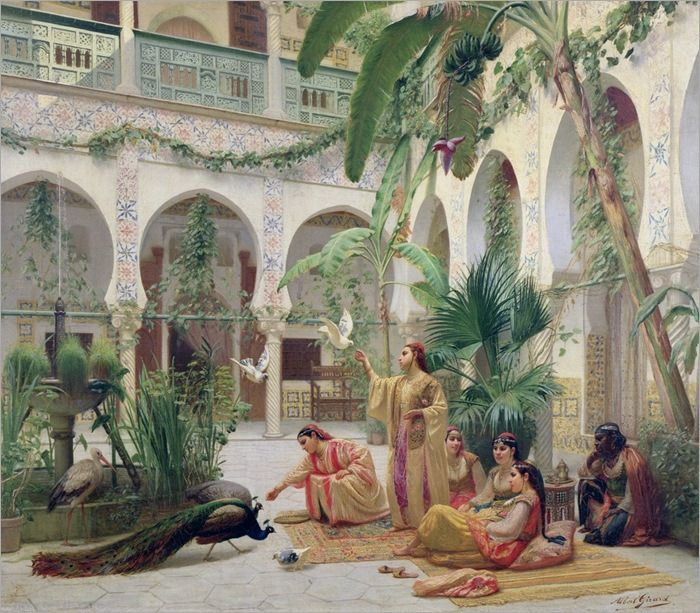
Court of the Harem

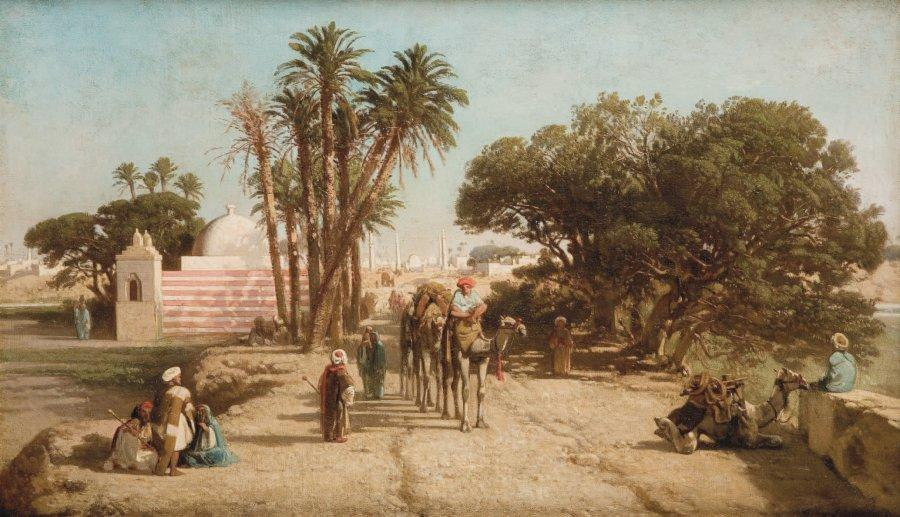
View of Syout, Egypt

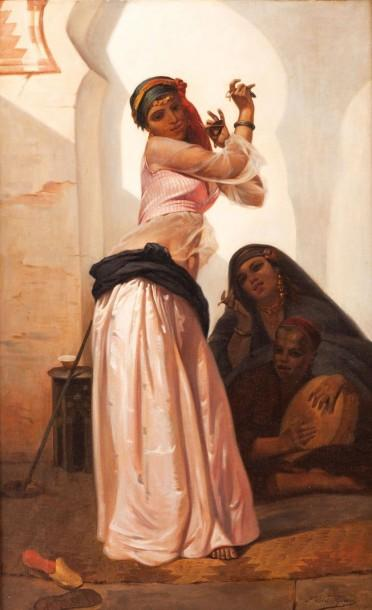
Oriental Dancer

== See also ==
- List of Orientalist artists
- Orientalism
