= Chasovennye =

Siberian sect of Old Believers

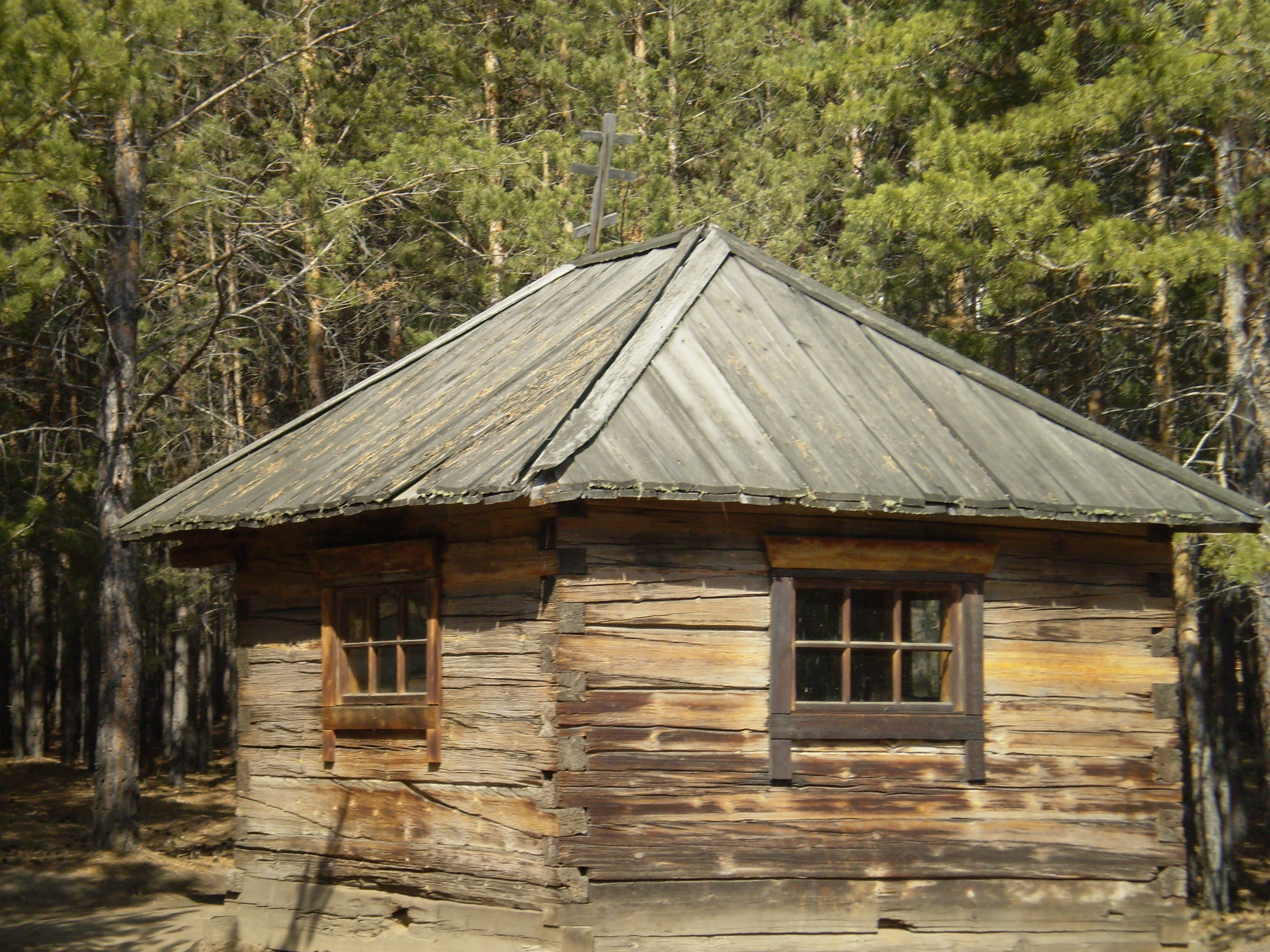
A Chasovennye chapel in Ulan-Ude, Transbaikalia

The Chasovennye people (also known as the Semeyskie or Semeiskie people east of Lake Baikal) are a Siberian sect of the Old Believers, Eastern Orthodox Christians who reject the reforms of Patriarch Nikon of Moscow in the 1650s and retain pre-Nikonian religious practices. Although they once allowed priesthood, they eventually joined other priestless (Bezpopovtsy) movements and outlawed priesthood and sacraments beyond baptism. The term Chasovennye itself refers to the literal chapels in which liturgical practices such as baptism occurred.

== History ==
Beginning in the 1650s and continuing into the early 1660s, Patriarch Nikon of Moscow initiated the reform of the Russian Orthodox Church, intending thereby to bring it closer to the practices of the Greek Orthodox Church. The reforms initiated several small changes - for instance, the switch from two to three folded fingers for the sign of the cross - and several major changes - the alteration of the text of prayers and the subsequent burning of old texts. After many church members rejected his reform efforts, Nikon resigned as Patriarch on July 10, 1658, and imposed an exile upon himself. Despite often clashing with Nikon, Tsar Alexis adopted these reforms as a means of strengthening his control over the Russian Church. As a result of this reform, the Russian Church split in two. The more conservative of these two viewpoints, today known as the Old Believers, were declared heretics and fled mostly east and north into Siberia and other areas west of the Ural Mountains such as Vetka in modern-day Belarus. In an effort to escape these reforms, many Old Believers performed acts of self-immolation.

In the 18th century during the division of Poland between the Russians, Prussia, and Austrian Empire, the Semeyskie people were exiled by the Russian Empire to Transbaikalia, being resettled several times between 1735 and 1795. The Semeyskie gained their name because of these numerous resettlements, moving as large families and forming their own towns and villages. In this process of relocation, the Semeyskie stood out among the predominantly-Cossack population of the area. They wore different clothes, spoke differently, and led a different way of life, even tying their scarves differently.

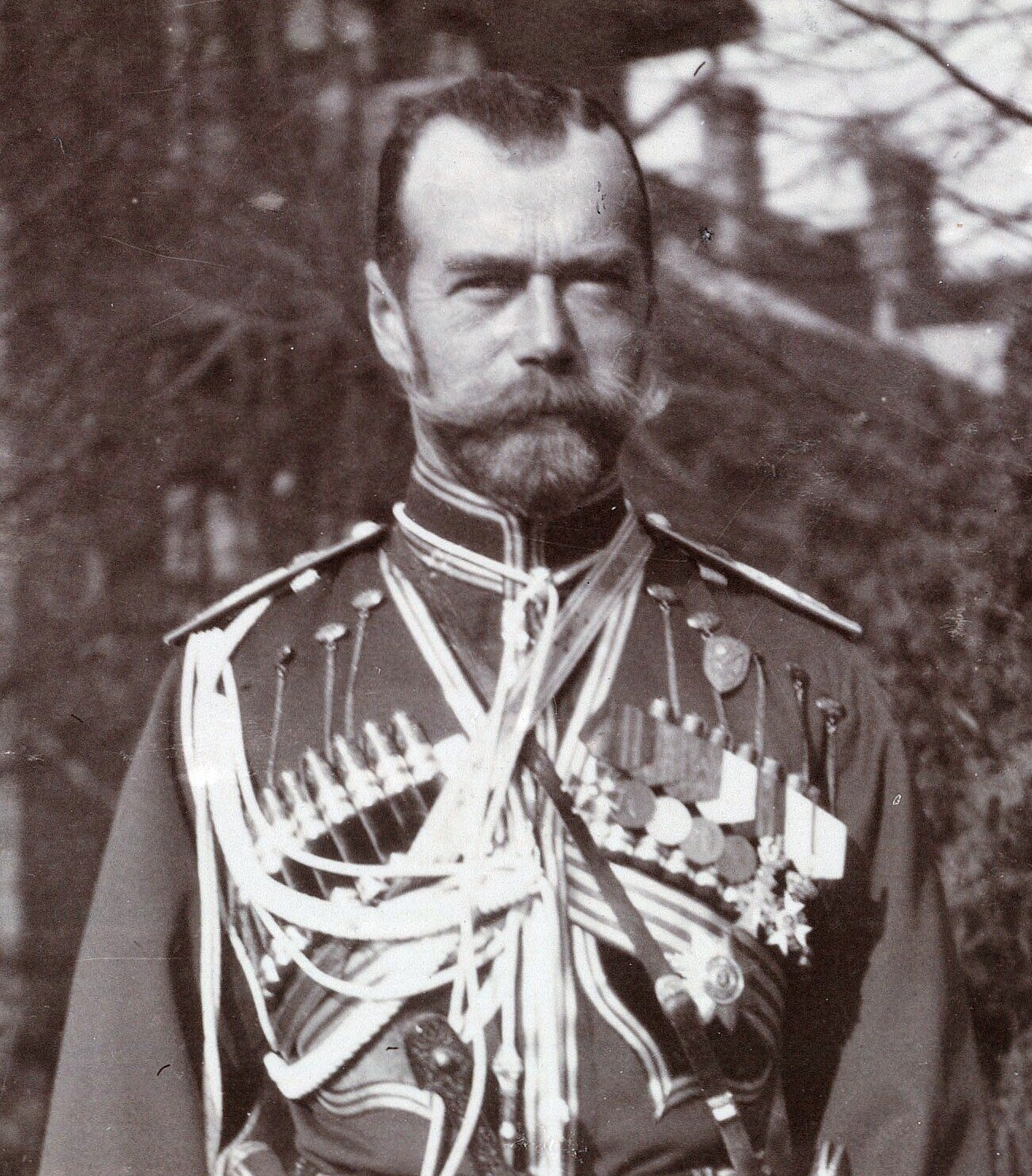
Tsar Nicholas II

Before 1906, the Chasovennye were not allowed to register independent newborns without converting to Orthodoxy. This was changed when Tsar Nicholas II make a decree allowing the registration of independent communities, as well as their performing traditional rites of baptism naming. Despite great variety in spelling amongst Chasovennye communities, some uniformity was adopted in non-Old Believer communities after standardization efforts were made to bring a uniform spelling to liturgical texts in the post-Nikonian reform era. The Chasovennye did not adopt these standardization efforts and followed the multiple different spellings of ancient Russian scribes, believing that these alternate spellings were pleasing to God.

On September 25, 1911, a congress opened in Yekaterinburg to clarify the official canon on the sacraments of baptism, marriage, communion, and confession. It attracted participates from Chasovennye communities across Russia, including Tomsk, Tobolsk, Perm, and Vyatka. In addition to the discussion of the sacraments, uniformity regarding hair length, alcohol, and tobacco was brought up. Issues of schooling, primarily the lack of education regarding the psalter, singing, and Chasovennye canon law, were also discussed. They resolved to form a Fraternal Council, whereby Old Believer communities elected their best men to attend biannual meetings and study Holy Scripture in Yekaterinburg, however this resolution was largely ineffective. After three days, the congress addressed the issue of the sacraments. They determined that baptism must be performed not by the now-absent clergy, but rather by lay "mentors." This clarification, however, opened even greater ambiguity. Some Chasovennye communities interpreted this to mean that mentors must not read aloud the negation rite, while others used Scripture to come to opposite conclusions. The Fraternal Council that it aimed to form was largely ineffective, not meeting until 1913, and its members were from only two Yekaterinburg communities, unable to draw from the vast Chasovennye communities of Siberia.

In the 1920s, amidst rising divorce rates and growth in the popularity of atheism among the peasantry, the Old Believers passed many resolutions to combat these trends. One resolution, passed on January 2, 1922, contained a requirement that parents and lay "mentors" raise children according to the statutes of pre-Nikonian Orthodoxy.

== Cultural Practices ==
While the cultural practices of the Chasovennye vary greatly from community to community, there are several practices that have been seen across multiple Chasovennye communities.

=== Self-Immolation ===
Self-immolation is the practice of lighting oneself on fire, typically for political or religious reasons. The Chasovennye viewed self-immolation desirably as a means to the true faith. To self-immolate, for many Old Believers, was preferable to falling into the hands of the Antichrist. There are several notable occurrences in history where self-immolation by Chasovennye occurred.

In both 1687 and 1688, a large group of rebels captured the Paleostrovskii Monastery and once surrounded by government troops, burned themselves to death instead of facing interrogation or execution. Similar instances occurred in 1687 in Berezov and around Pudozh in 1684 and 1693. When capturing monasteries and subsequently lighting themselves on fire, the Chasovennye rebels claimed it was in defense of the old rite. Although suicide is considered a grave sin in Christianity, the rebels saw it as the best response in an unbearable dilemma. Some even argued that self-immolation was the "ultimate expression of Christian asceticism."

On June 15, 1756, in the Tomsk province of Siberia, several Chasovennye peasants began to preach to their non-Old Believer neighbors about the importance of self-immolation to salvation, arguing that the Antichrist walked among them in Russia. After rallying over two hundred sympathizers and receiving the blessings of the elders, they assembled in a small forest and prepared for self-immolation. Once the military heard of this soon-to-be incident, the chief inspector Kop'ev was presented with a written statement attacking the new church and state. After much discussion, several Chasovennye leaders went to Kop'ev, instead appealing to the crowd that self-immolation was the only means to salvation in corrupt Russia. As a result, more than a hundred Old Believers died by suicide. After hearing about this incident, Peter III's regime ordered an investigation, finding the bishop of Tobol'sk responsible.

=== Books and Illustration ===
Important to the culture of the Old Believers were books, and the same is true of the Chasovennye subgroup. Until recently, the Chasovennye avoided modern printing technologies and chose to hand-write texts instead of printing them. Formerly they primarily used books printed before the Schism, not only because they did not have to engage with modern printing technologies, but also because they contained the proper, former prayers of their Old Belief. Modernization of their culture and surrounding communities, however, required lessening restrictions on printing. As a result, several external publishing houses emerged in Chasovennye communities in the 2010s, and several apocryphal texts were printed through them.

Inside these newly-printed works was many images and illustrations, most of which depicted images of Sacred history, the mother of God, saints, and heaven. Despite the fact that the Chasovennye are very cautious towards photography and electronic communication, calling it the "snare of the devil," photographs from the Internet are often featured in these works. In addition to these photographic images, the Chasovennye also included illustrations from church books, local painting, images from Christian literature, and modern graphics and art. Although photography of religious items is prohibited by Chasovennye custom, photographs of icons are often included in these printed works, although usually only one or two in the entire book. These photographs are typically included upon receiving permission from the thesobor, the group of individuals in charge of making decisions regarding Chasovennye canon law. In addition to these photographs, monks and nuns are commonly depicted in Chasovennye books, usually with some sign, such as a halo, signalling their proximity to heaven.

Lubok, or folk picture, is a type of folk art with its own aesthetic history and means of expression. It synthesizes various art types, such as comics, prints, and icons, and depicts the social aspects of Chasovennye life as well as religious images such as icons, Old Believer scenes, and the lives of saints. The original prints, before they were adapted to modern printing, used colored pencil, watercolors, and felt-tip pens. They were especially popular and influential in confessional environments, since it created an "us vs. them" mentality within the Chasovennye world view. There were also prominent motifs of the afterlife, similar to motifs in other print sources. These afterlife motifs were both positive and negative. Some depicted reward after death, while others depicted afterlife torment and were meant to correct adherents' religious practices and guide them away from sin.

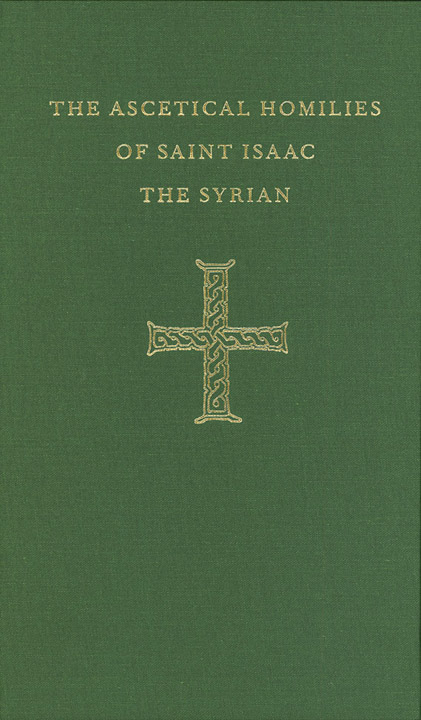
The Ascetical Homilies of St. Isaac the Syrian

Comics also played a large role in Chasovennye culture. Typically depicting religious figures such as Isaac the Syrian, the comics were largely used to promote observance of religious practices such as fasting. However, comics also served another purpose in Chasovennye communities - to promote health and nutrition. Using quotes from Scripture and the words of the saints, these comics used metaphors of fruit and honey to describe the proper eating habits of Old Believers. The eating must be done in moderation, it says, in order for the act of eating itself to sweeten like honey or fruit in the eyes of God. These comics depicted the actions they were discussing - comics depicting the "escape from the world" would depict monks in prayer, while comics about proper eating would include a group of individuals eating at a table together. They also often depict animals to symbolize these religious practices, such as a bird rushing to its nest or a snake protecting its head in battle, both of which are meant to symbolize the model of the pious, praying monk fighting against life's adversities.

=== Labor Practices ===
Several proverbs related to labor are well-known in the region. One notes that "The harvest is not from dew, but from sweat," and another that "A person gets sick from laziness, but from work he gets healthy." In addition to these proverbs, children were taught by example from a young age of how to properly labor. In addition, young boys actively helped in agriculture from an early age, while girls sat at the spinning wheel, learning how to sew basic clothing. Agriculture was crucial to the survival of Chasovennye communities, allowing them to sustain themselves and exist independently of surrounding, non-Old Believer communities. During the Chasovennye's initial migration to Siberia, there was a notable lack of agriculture across the region. Although the indigenous Buryats grew a small number of grains, their grain processing was notably slow and opened the door for the Chasovennye to cultivate their own grains, make it into breads, and sell it to the other communities in the region. Bread was sold to troops and the nearby Petrovsky ironworks. The Chasovennye methods of agriculture were so effective that they were shortly thereafter adopted by the natives.

Spiritually, labor was an essential vessel for saving one's soul, according to the Semeyskie. The most hard-working, most laborious workers were kept in the memories of Semeyskie villages for several decades and praised by members of the community for their unselfish attitude. The most hard-working laborers were those who helped widows, orphans, and households without a patriarch. However, not all work was valued equally by the Chasovennye. While there were positive sentiments towards agricultural labor, doctors, and teachers, the same could not be said of other occupations. Many individuals rejected careers in music, science, or government work because of the strong attitudes of their ancestors.

== Chasovennye Subgroups ==
Within the larger Chasovennye are several smaller subgroups, depending on their practice and location in Siberia. Particularly notable among these are the Semeyskie, and smaller subgroups in the Ural Mountains around cities like Perm, such as the Bogorodskaya, Vasilyevskaya, Stryapuninskaya, and Malo-Zagarskaya communities.

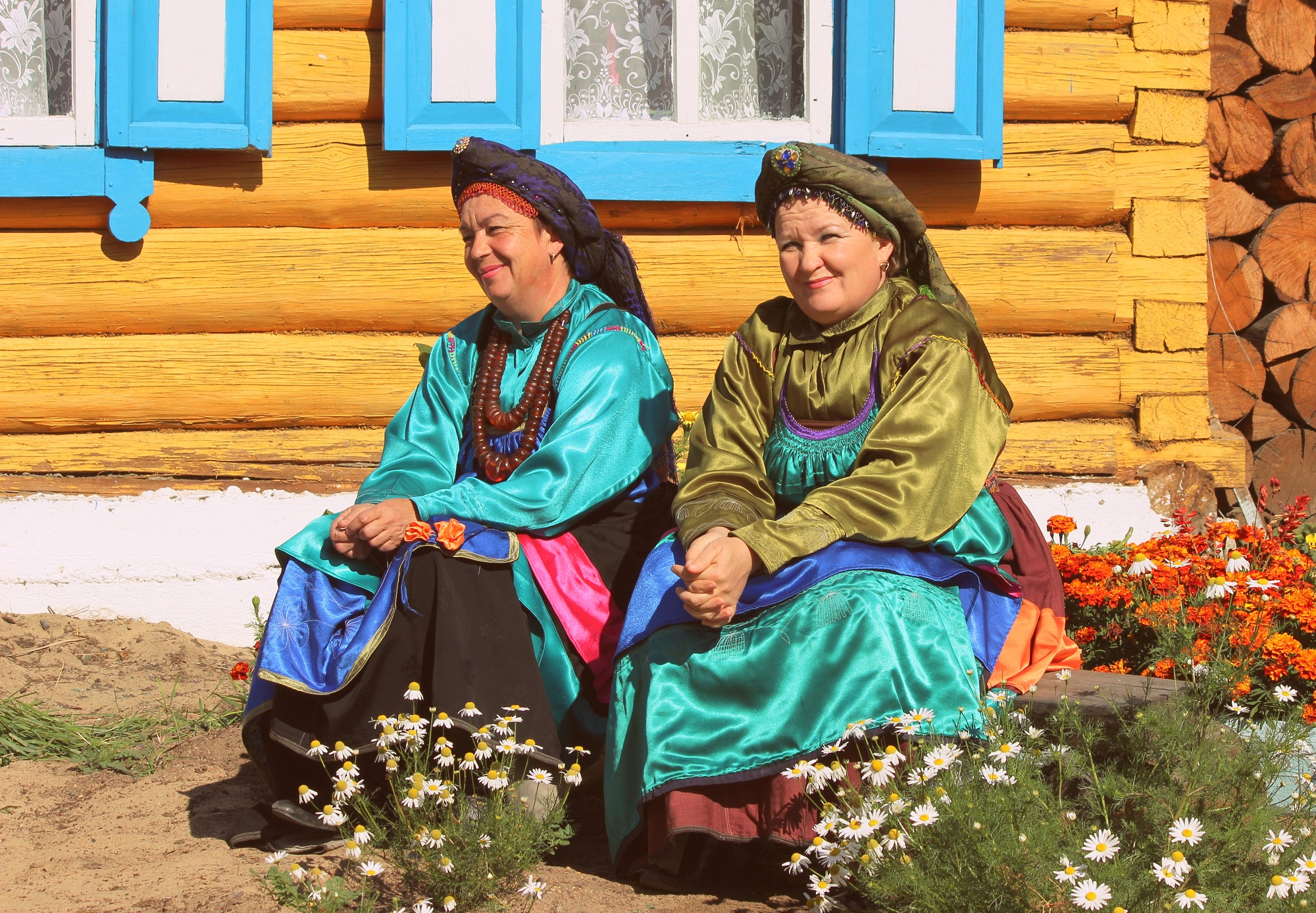
Two Semeiskie women in Buryatia

=== Semeyskie ===
The Semeyskie live in Transbaikalia and Buryatia, in the cities of Gusinoozyorsk and Ulan-Ude. They speak their own language, which primarily comes from Russian, but also borrows works from Buryat, Ukrainian, Polish, and Belarusian. The Semeyskie, like many other Old Believer sects, distance themselves from the modern world and its many technological innovations. They do not have access to the internet, modern medicine, or television. They fast 244 days of the year, and their cuisine consists of stewed meats, pickled vegetables, soups, berry-filled flatbreads, scrambled eggs in lard, and other dairy and wheat products.

At different points in their history, the Semeyskie have worked in areas ranging from agriculture to the gold mines. They were the largest producers of grain in the region, providing much of the Far East population with bread. The deer of the region were valuable for their meat, fats, and skins, and they provided the Semeyskie with a means of international trade with Chinese merchants. Several fairs were held in Transbaikalia in the 18th and 19th centuries that allowed for regional trade between the Semeyskie and other peoples. At these fairs, they frequently traded furs, nuts, fish, grain, and livestock. Trade within Semeyskie communities frequently consisted of meat and dairy products as well as household trinkets and handmade goods in exchange for money.

Despite the modern prevalence of mixed marriages, the Semeyskie are forbidden to eat with members of other faiths, per their centuries-old tradition. Experts associate the Semeyskie's love of painted houses with the Ukrainian and Belarusian painted and whitewashed huts. It is common for Semeyskie women to have between 10 and 24 children, and familial hierarchy is predominantly patriarchal. Amber beads and jewelry were particularly prized by Semeyskie women, who not only used it for beauty purposes, but also crushed up the amber into powders, providing a much-needed source of iodine to the deficient population.

=== Ural Communities ===
Many Chasovennye communities settled in and around the Urals in cities like Perm and Yekaterinburg. Much academic work has surrounded the Russian nomenclature and the linguistics of these Ural communities. These communities lived in what is now the Perm region, between the Kama and Obva rivers, however records suggest that the same naming practices were also used across different regions of Siberia. Within the villages, towns, and cities in which they lived, they made up approximately a fifth of the population in 1833.

== Religious Practice ==
Being a subsect of the priestless (Bezpopovtsy) movement, the Chasovennye had no priests and did not partake in the Eucharist or any other sacraments. After banning the priesthood from their practice, the Chasovennye replaced the typical priest model with greater involvement from lay "mentors." Beyond this, there is great diversity in the practice of religion amongst the subsects of the Chasovennye.

=== Baptism ===
The children of the Chasovennye would receive new names at baptism, and the baptism itself was performed by a mentor. The children tended to be named on the eighth day after birth, in accordance with ancient Christian tradition observed in the pre-Nikonian Russian Church tradition. The children would typically be given the name of a revered saint.

=== Funeral Ceremonies ===
The funeral rite of the Chasovennye is one way in which they mark their territory and express themselves as an individual religious community. Before a person dies, it is customary to light candles made of beeswax, manufactured by a specially-blessed member of the Chasovennye community. The dying individual and their close relatives, so long as the death is not sudden, usually prepare and handspin their own funeral clothes, although it is common today to purchase fabrics and "correct" or "purify" them. These garments must not be knotted in any way. They are also given a new cross to be worn on the neck, and there is a preference that it be made of natural materials such as cedar. Often inside the coffin of the dead is a Lestovka, a prayer rope or "ladder" of the Old Believers, which is meant to symbolize the ladder-like ascent from earth to heaven. Other items, such as books and icons, may also be placed in the coffin. Before burial, the body is washed with a cloth dampened by flowing river water. Typically, older members of the community wash the bodies, with elderly men washing dead men and elderly women washing dead women. In the Ural Chasovennye tradition, those who assist with the funeral - those who wash and dress the dead, as well as those "mentors" who read prayers and those who dig the grave - are given food and cloth from the family of the deceased individual, along with a note of the dead's name. In return, it was expected that prayers be given for the deceased.

Chasovennye cemeteries are typically deeply segregated, and the dead's fate was considered to be determined by where they were buried. Those who had not observed fasts and did not keep beards were buried distant from the rest. The Chasovennye also distance their dead from Muslims and Nikonian Christians by establishing distinct cemeteries. Participating in funerals of non-Chasovennye people is considered a grave sin.

=== Hermitages ===
Monks, after being baptized and entering the hermitage, were considered the guardians of the Chasovennye faith and the guardians of the afterlife for those who are "lovers of Christ." The hermitages and monasteries typically received financial support from local merchants. The Soviet government tried to cooperate and integrate several Chasovennye communities into the greater Russian landscape after hearing rumors that their hermitages were "spontaneously communist." Appealing to this characterization, the Chasovennye demonstrated their loyalty in order to reach the opposite outcome, and they gained greater economic autonomy as a result.

=== Lestovka ===
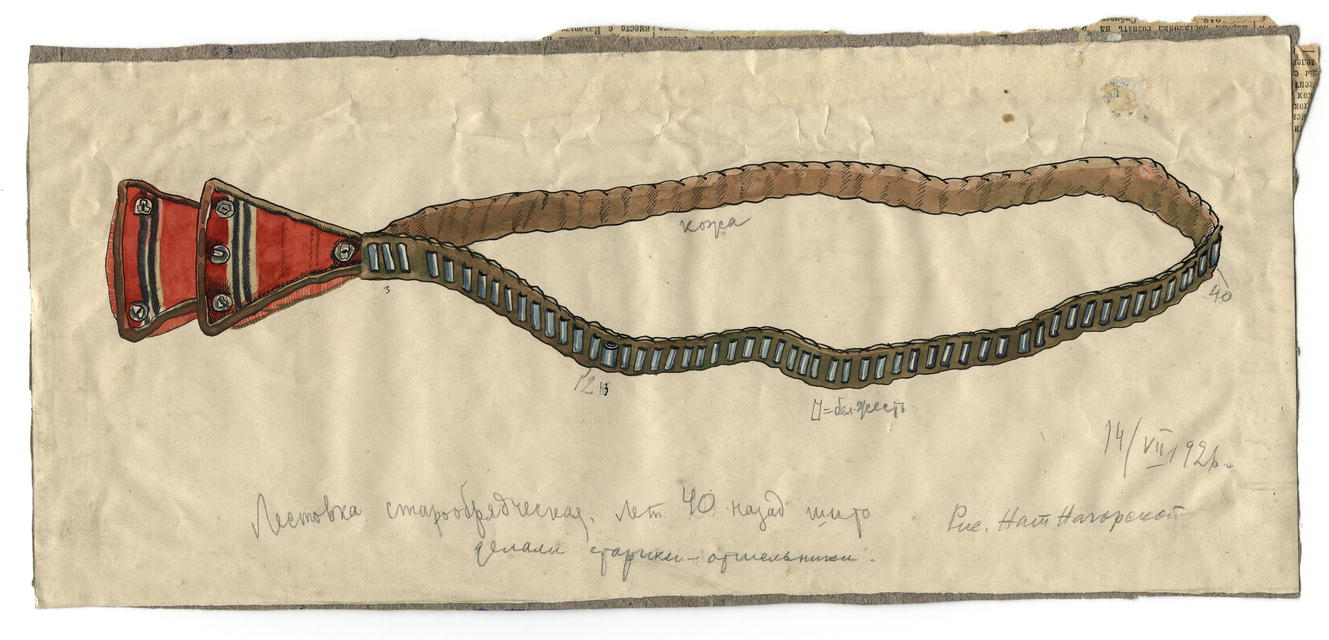
Traditional Lestovka

Lestovka, or lestvitsa, is a traditional rope used across many different Chasovennye subgroups, and its use in religious practice varies widely. The lestovka is meant to symbolize salvation for those who keep Old Belief religious practices. Many Chasovennye use the Isusova (Jesus) lestovka and the Bogorodichnaya (Mother of God) lestovka for prayer, in addition to other types of lestovka for occasions such as travel.

=== Holiday Celebrations ===
In addition to the traditional Christian holidays of Christmastide and their celebration of the New Year in September, the Chasovennye also celebrate several pagan holidays - notably, Maslenitsa (Butter Week) and Kupala Night. They celebrate these holidays with song and feast, both for interested tourists and for their own adherents. Despite laboring almost every other day of the year, work on these holidays was strictly prohibited.

== See also ==
- Old Believers
- Bezpopovtsy - the priestless sect of the Old Believers
- Eastern Orthodox Church
- Russian Orthodox Church
- Siberia
