= Vojnič-Sienažecki Palace and Park Complex =

Estate in Belarus

The Vojnič-Sienažecki Palace and Park Complex
- Палацава-паркавы комплекс Войніч-Сянажэцкіх
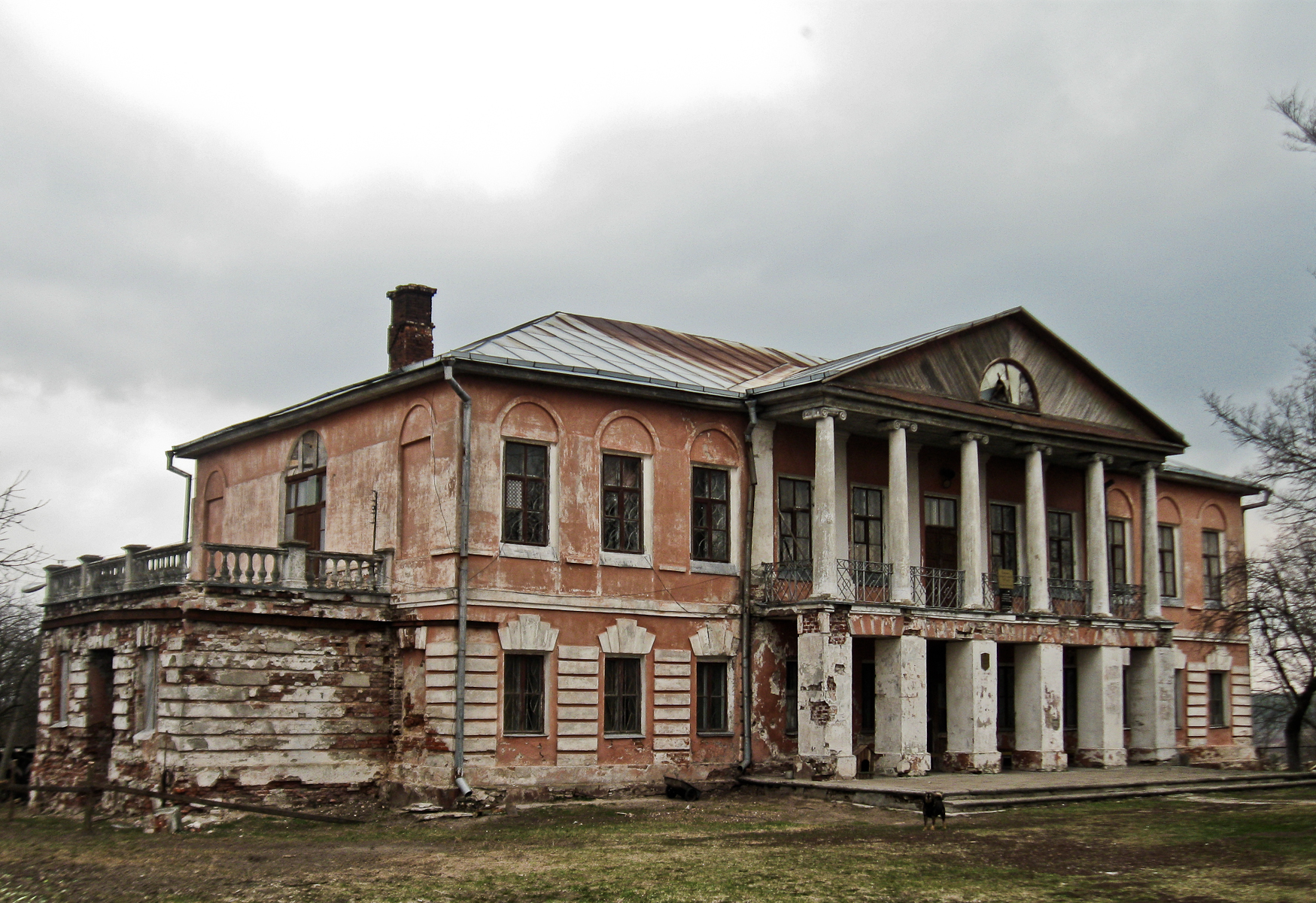
- The Vojnič-Sienažecki Palace
- Alternative names: the Chalecki Manor

General information
- Location: Chaĺč, Vietka District, Belarus
- Coordinates: 52.5700278°N 31.1307917°E
- Completed: the early 19th century

The Vojnič-Sienažecki Palace and Park Complex (also known as the Chalecki Manor) is a monument of classicist architecture completed in the early 19th century in the village of Chalč, Vietka District, Belarus (the former estate of the Chalecki family) on the right bank of the river Sož.

== History ==
In 1437, the village of Chalč was given by Grand Duke Švitrigaila to the Chalecki family, who built a church and a Jesuit monastery in the second half of the XVII century.

One of the members of the Chalecki family married a princess from the Radziwill family and received Vietka as a dowry. They decided however to sell Vietka and build an estate in Chalč. The construction of the manor complex was completed in the early 19th century.

The Chaleckis owned the manor until 1812. When Napoleon came to Belarus, they took his side. After the defeat of the French army by Russia, the Chaleckis went into exile. Their estate was confiscated by the Russian authorities and sold at auction to a member of the Vojnič-Sienažecki family.

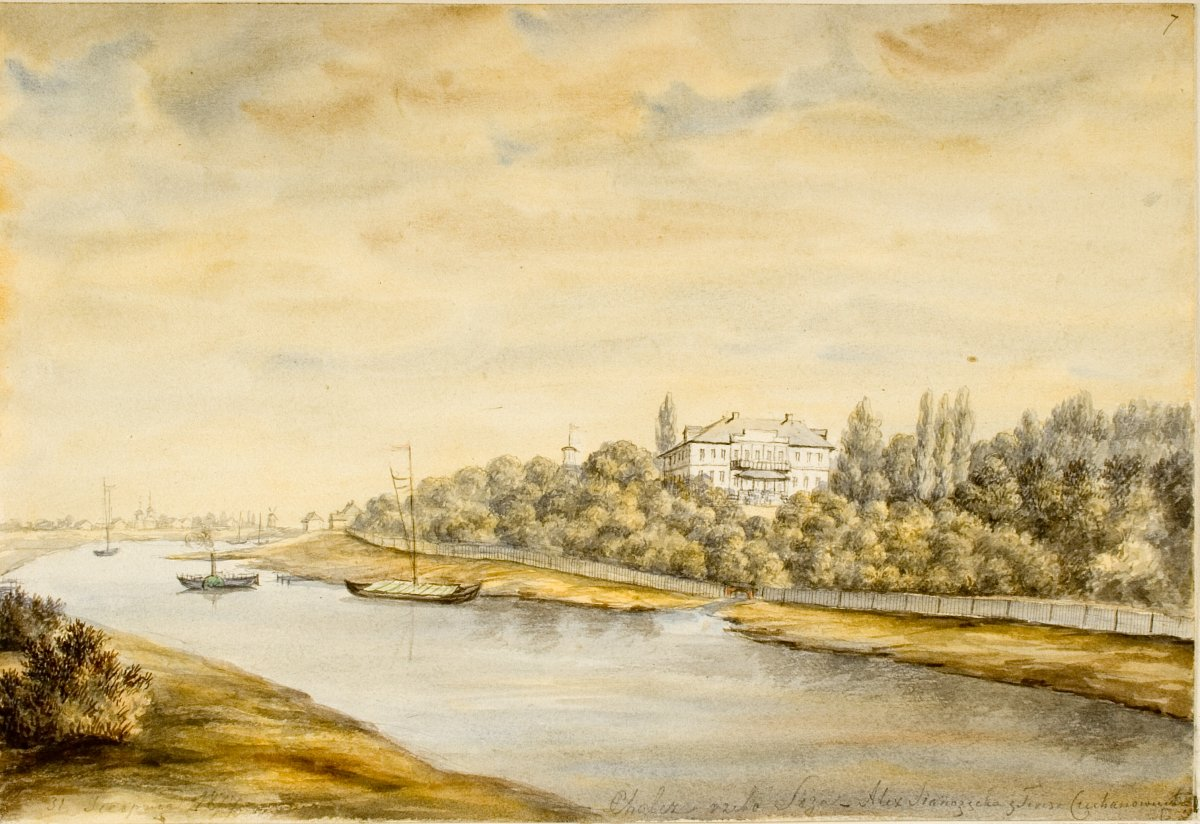
The Vojnič-Sienažecki Manor, Napoleon Orda, 19th century

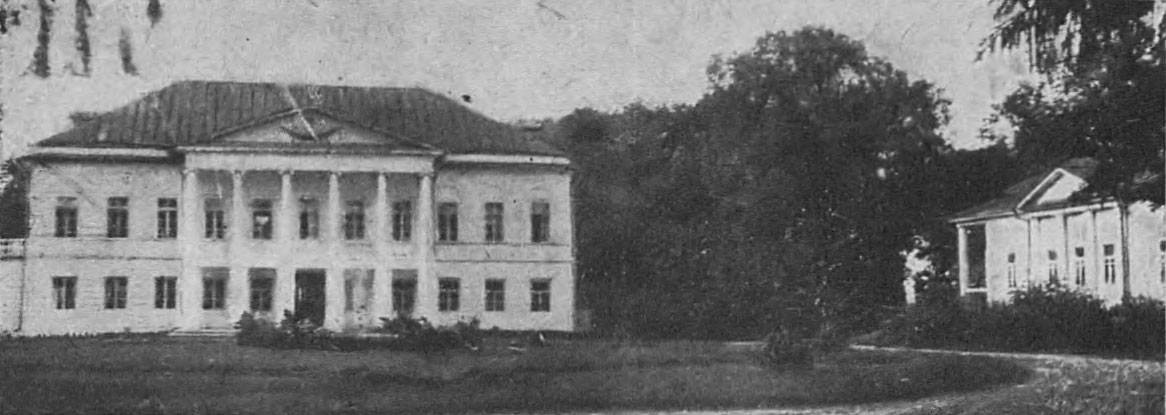
The Vojnič-Sienažecki Palace, picture, beginning of 20th century

During the anti-Russian January uprising of 1863, the owner of the estate Alexander Sienažecki hid Kalinoŭski insurgents in the manor house. After Alexander, the owner of the estate became Sigmund Vojnič-Sienažecki, who was known for lavish balls and hunting parties.

In 1887, the guest of the estate was the artist Napoleon Orda, who painted the manor.

After the Bolsheviks came to power, the estate was confiscated and the last descendant of the Vojnič-Sienažecki family was executed. During the Soviet era, the estate served as a shelter for homeless children and later as an NKVD prison, where "enemies of the people" were incarcerated. In the second half of the XX century, the manor house was a prison for women with children, which was later disbanded.

== Estate complex ==
The estate consisted of a manor house, two main outbuildings, stables and other structures. Today, only the manor house remains in a dilapidated state.

The manor house was two-storey, the first floor was built of wood and the ground one of stone. There was a library, an archive, a dining room and two guest bedrooms on the ground floor. A ballroom was located in the middle on the first floor.

The palace was surrounded by a park, which extended to the bank of the river Sož.

== Current state ==
The Chalecki manor is being gradually restored but remains in disrepair. The cost of a complete restoration is estimated at Euro 2 million and the question of funding "remains open".
