= Vyetka district =

District of Gomel region, Belarus

Coordinates: 52°41′00″N 31°13′32″E

Vyetka district Веткаўскі раён (Belarusian) Ветковский район (Russian)
- District
- Flag Coat of arms

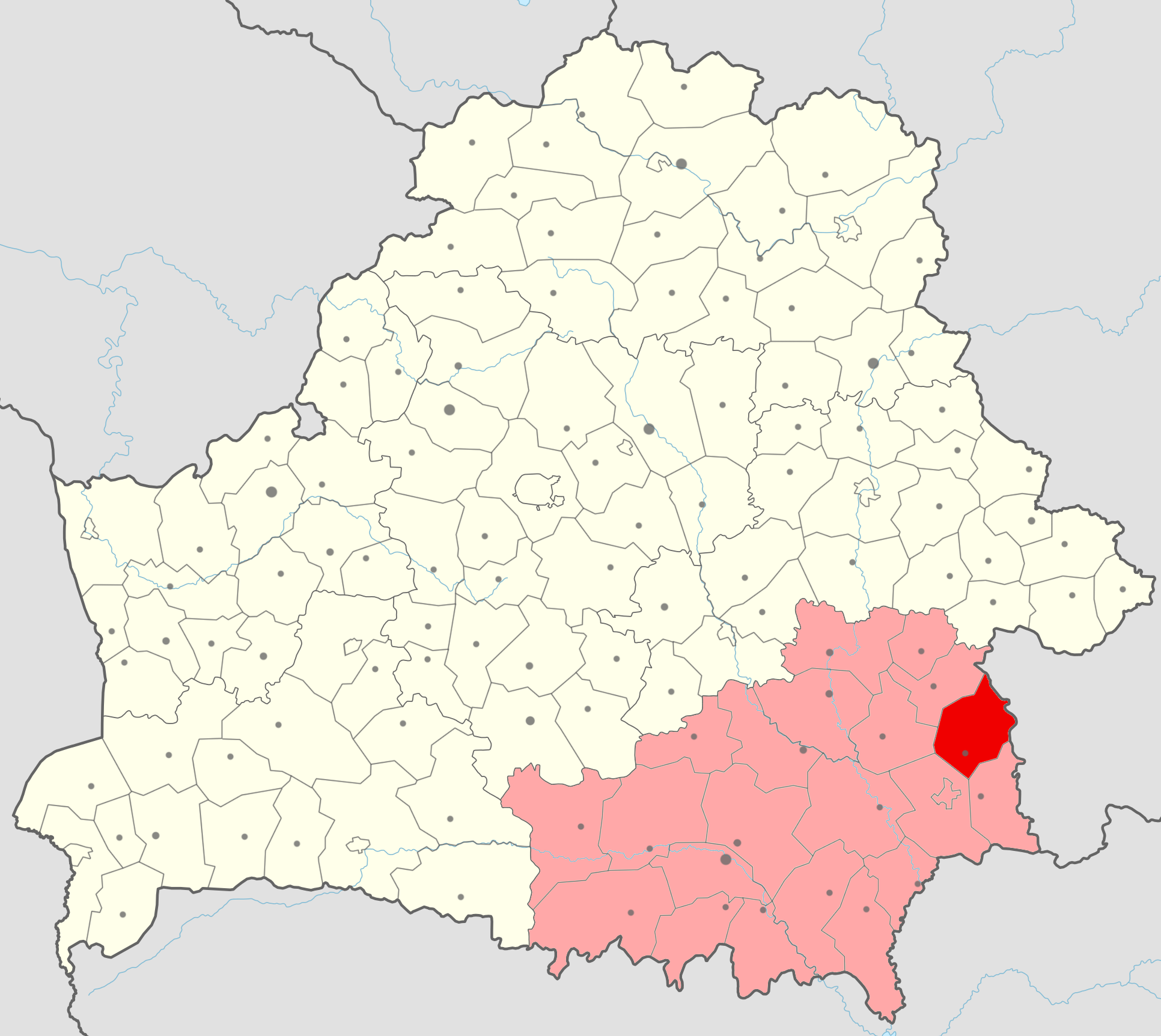
- Country: Belarus
- Region: Gomel region
- Administrative center: Vyetka

Area
  - Total: 1,558.62 km^{2} (601.79 sq mi)

Population (2024)
  - Total: 17,109
  - Density: 10.977/km^{2} (28.430/sq mi)
- Time zone: UTC+3 (MSK)

Vyetka district or Vetka district (Belarusian: Веткаўскі раён, romanized: Vietkaŭski rajon; Russian: Ветковский район) is a district (raion) of Gomel region in Belarus. Its administrative center is Vyetka. As of 2024, it has a population of 17,109.

== Geography ==
The district covers an area of 1,558 square kilometres (602 sq mi) and includes 139 settlements, of which only 82 are inhabited. The remaining 57 settlements are situated in the exclusion zone following the Chernobyl disaster, as the contaminated area was evacuated due to high radiation levels. The areas north and east of the city of Vetka fall within the evacuated zone, which extends all the way to the Russian border. Signs placed along the roads indicate the start of the zone boundary.

== Population ==
Population
| Year | Population | Year | Population | Year | Population | Year | Population | Year | Population |
|---|---|---|---|---|---|---|---|---|---|
| 1970 | 52,689 | 2001 | 21,121 | 2006 | 19,481 | 2011 | 18,569 | 2016 | 17,776 |
| 1979 | 44,261 | 2002 | 20,721 | 2007 | 19,298 | 2012 | 18,359 | 2017 | 17,790 |
| 1989 | 35,321 | 2003 | 20,486 | 2008 | 19,070 | 2013 | 18,109 | 2018 | 17,838 |
| 1996 | 20,600 | 2004 | 20,045 | 2009 | 18,928 | 2014 | 17,896 | 2019 | 17,810 |
| 2000 | 21,411 | 2005 | 19,775 | 2010 | 18,677 | 2015 | 17,812 | 2023 | 17,268 |

== Culture ==
- Vojnič-Sienažecki Palace and Park Complex
- Vetka Museum of Old Believers and Belarusian Traditions
