= Pierre Girard (painter) =

French painter

Pierre Girard (1806 in Paris – 1872 in Paris) was a French painter, landscape artist, student of Antoine-Jean Gros. He exhibited at the Salon from 1827. His students included Napoleon Orda.

Girard's son Paul-Albert Girard (1839–1920) was also a painter.
