= Napoleon Orda =

Polish–Lithuanian musician (1807–1883)

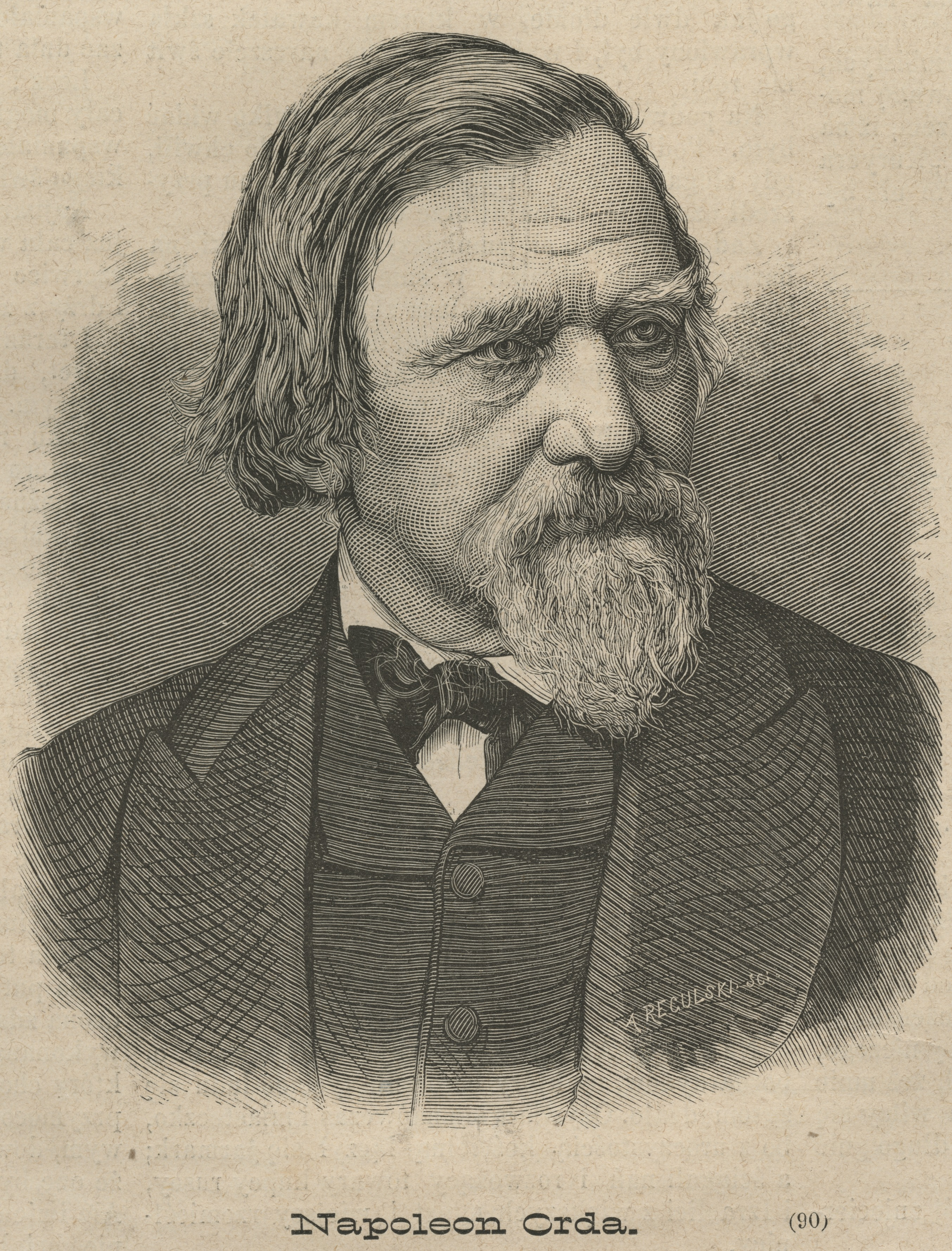
- Portrait by Aleksander Regulski (1883)
- Born: 11 February 1807; Worocewicze, Russian Empire (now Varatsevichy, Belarus)
- Died: 26 April 1883 (aged 76); Warsaw, Congress Poland, Russian Empire (now Poland)

Napoleon Mateusz Tadeusz Orda (Belarusian: Напалеон Орда; Lithuanian: Napoleonas Orda; 11 February 1807 – 26 April 1883) was a Polish–Lithuanian musician, pianist, composer, and artist, best known for numerous sketches of historical sites of the former Polish–Lithuanian Commonwealth.

== Biography ==
Napoleon Orda was born in the village of Varacevičy in the Pinsky Uyezd of Minsk Governorate (now in Ivanava District of Belarus) in his father's manor. His father, Michał Orda, was an impoverished noble of Lithuanian ancestry and the marshal of the powiat of Kobryn. His mother was Józefa (nee Butrymowicz). After finishing Svislach gymnasium in 1823, he started mathematical studies at the Imperial University of Vilnius. However, his university career came to an end on 27 August 1826, when he was arrested by the Russian secret police for taking part in a secret student society "Zorzanie", which was active in Svislach and Białystok gymnasiums. Although he was released soon afterwards, he was expelled from the university and was not allowed to continue his studies.

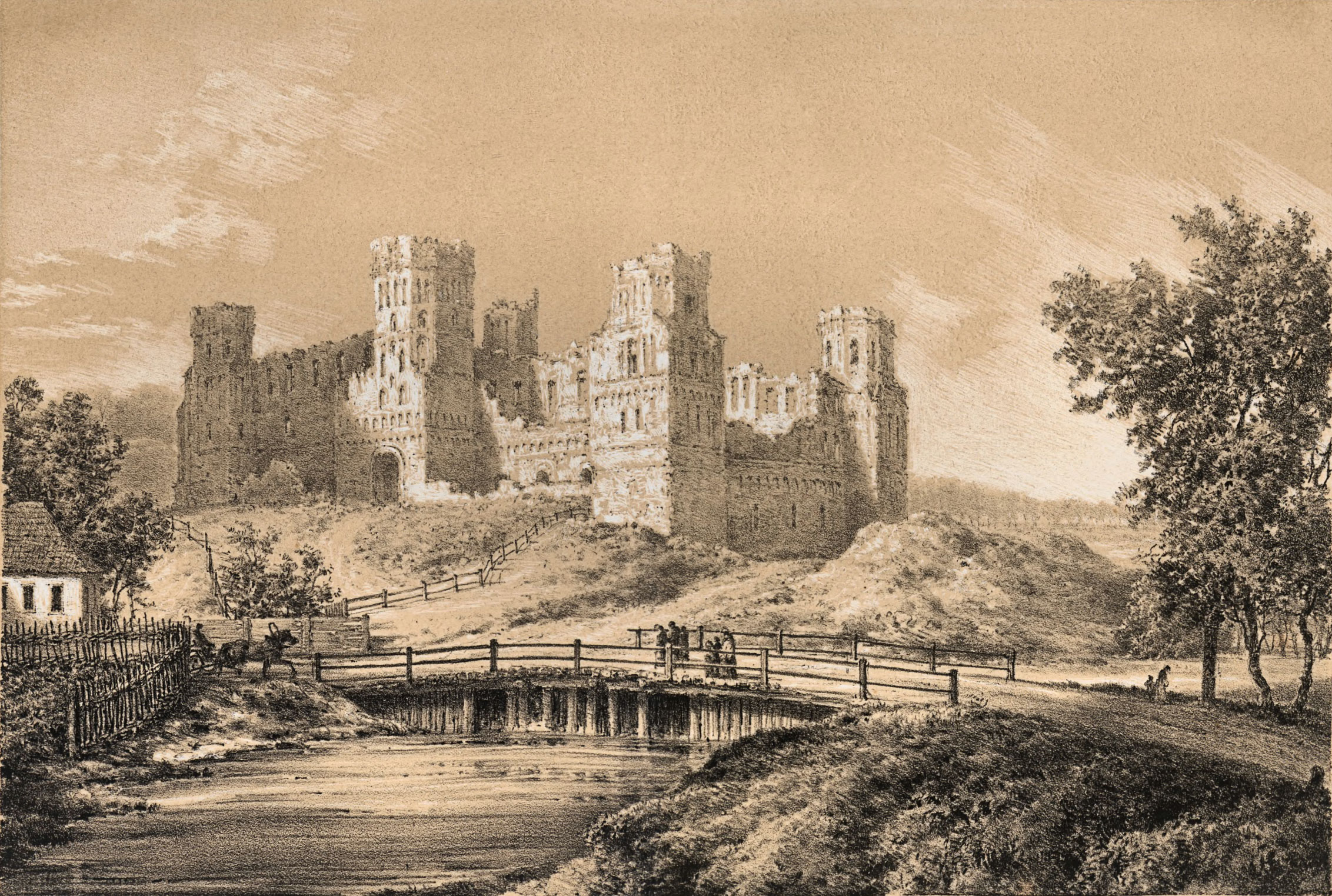
Mir Castle, Belarus, 1876

Orda took part in the failed November Uprising of 1830 against Russian Empire and served with distinction in the famous 4th Regiment (Czwartacy). For his bravery he received the highest Polish military decoration, the Virtuti Militari. After the uprising his manor was confiscated and Orda had to flee abroad in order to avoid being imprisoned and sent to Siberia.

He travelled through many European countries, including Italy and Switzerland. Finally in 1833, he settled in Paris, where he became one of the prominent members of the Polish diaspora there and one of the close friends of Fryderyk Chopin. He learned to play the piano under the guidance of Chopin and Franz Liszt and wrote several mazurkas, waltzes and polonaises. While in Paris he also studied painting briefly with Pierre Girard and started to portray his long lost motherland in countless sketches.

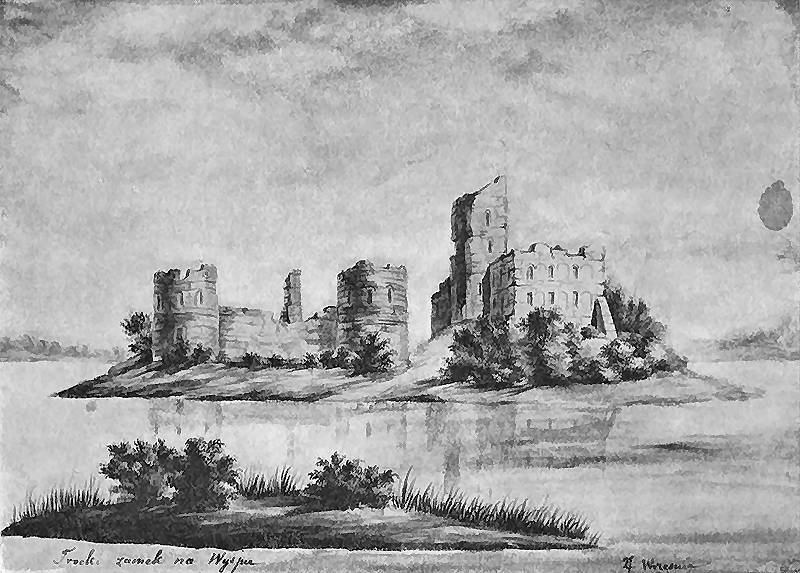
Trakai Castle on the Trakai Lake, pencil and watercolour, ca. 1877

In Paris, Orda married Irene Bougle and worked as the head of Maison de Commission shop. He was also the head of the Italian Opera in Paris, until it was closed due to the February Revolution of 1848. He was also an active member of various Polish political and social organisations, including the Committee of Polish Emigrants. Most of his spare time he spent travelling. He visited France, England, Scotland, Belgium, the Netherlands, Lorraine, Spain, Portugal and Algeria.

During the Post-Sevastopolian Thaw in 1856 he was pardoned by tsar Alexander II and was allowed to return home. He was also restored the rights to his village of Varacevičy. In 1859 he requested from tzar and had received back his money that were confiscated together with his estate. In 1862, he moved to Wierzchownia where he served as a manager of general Adam Rzewuski's domain.

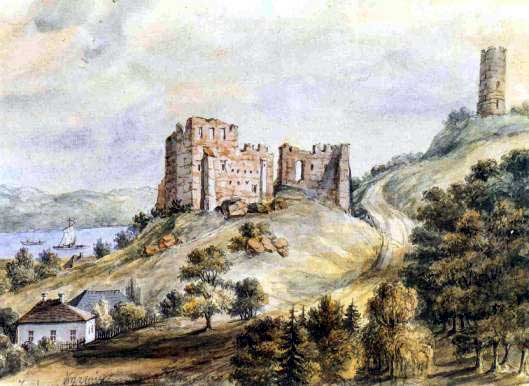
Ruins of the castle in Kazimierz Dolny, watercolour, ca. 1870

In 1872, Orda started to travel through the lands of the partitioned Polish–Lithuanian Commonwealth and document its historical landmarks and architecture. During his summer trips throughout the country he made more than 1,000 sketches depicting various towns, cities and historical landscapes. He also depicted landscapes, urban and rural architecture, churches and palaces of the partitioned Commonwealth, which included the regions of present-day Belarus, Lithuania, Poland, Ukraine, as well as several regions of France, Germany, Portugal and Switzerland. His works are pencil sketches tinted with watercolour, gouache and sepia. Between 1872 and 1874 he visited most of the notable castles, manors and towns in Volhynia, Podolia and Ukraine. Until 1877 he documented the historical heritage of Lithuania, Samogitia, Livonia and Belarus. In 1878 and 1879 he made a trip to Galicia, Greater Poland and Royal Prussia and finally in 1880 he portrayed the Congress Poland. Approximately 260 of his sketches were turned into lithographies by Alojzy Misierowicz and published in Warsaw by Maksymilian Fajans in a series of eight albums under the collective title Album of Polish Historical Landscapes (Polish: Album widoków historycznych Polski) between 1873 and 1883.

In his testament he bequeathed his sketches to the Polish people and currently most of his works are kept in the National Museum in Kraków and Warsaw. Besides their artistic value, they are a priceless source of information on the history and architecture of Poland, Belarus and Ukraine, whose historical heritage was largely destroyed by the Germans during World War II.

Orda died on 26 April 1883 in Warsaw, but according to his last will he was buried in his native land, in Ivanava village, near Kobryn in his family crypt. In the 1980s, the cemetery was destroyed by Soviet authorities in order to build a kindergarten in its place. After some time the gravestone from Orda's tomb was found and moved to a museum in Pinsk.

Orda's niece was the artist Helena Skirmunt.

== Commemoration of Orda in Belarus ==
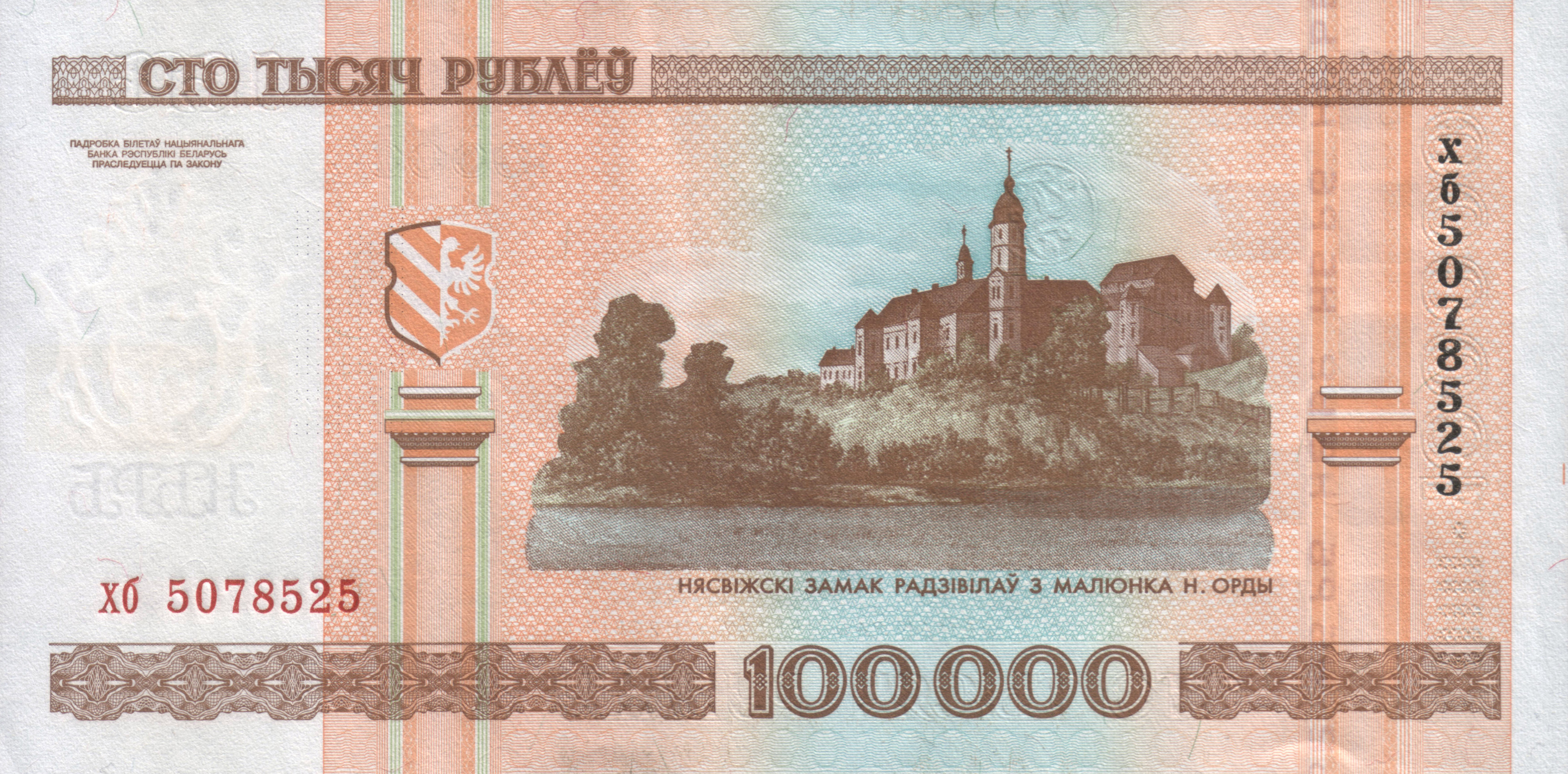
Banknote of 100 000 BYR with Niasvizh Castle by Orda

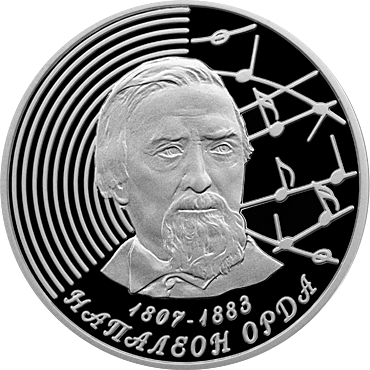
Belarusian silver coin, devoted to the 200th anniversary of Orda

In 1997, a monument to Orda was erected in the town of his burial by sculptor Ivan Holubieu.

In 2007, the National Bank of the Republic of Belarus issued silver and copper-nickel memory coins, devoted to the 200th anniversary of Orda's birth. His work of Niasvizh Castle was also placed on the banknote of 100 000 BYR.

The streets in Minsk and Grodno are named after Orda.

In 2010, Google commemorated Orda's date of birth by placing special logo with his work in Belarusian version of the search service.

== Gallery ==
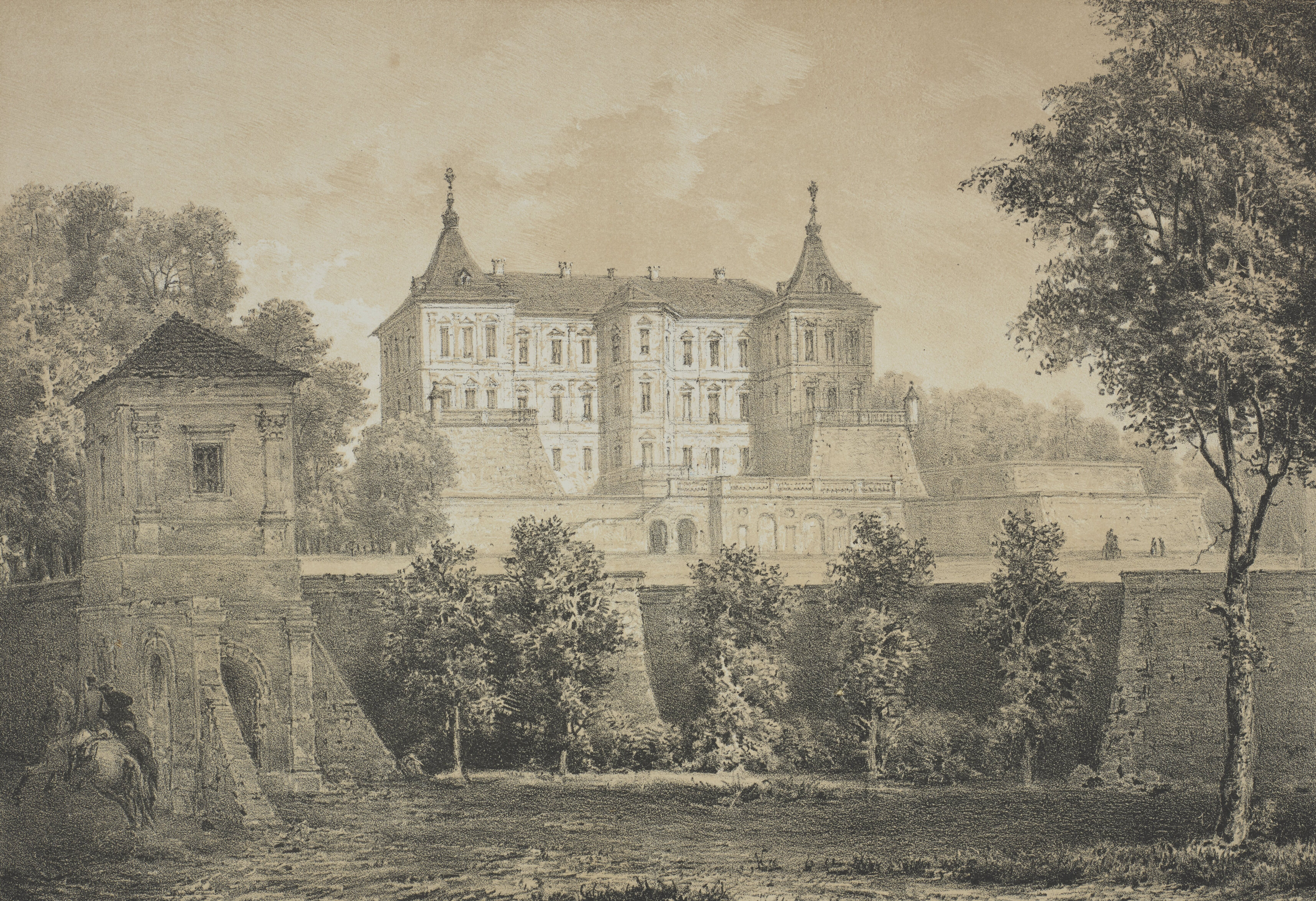
Pidhirtsi Castle

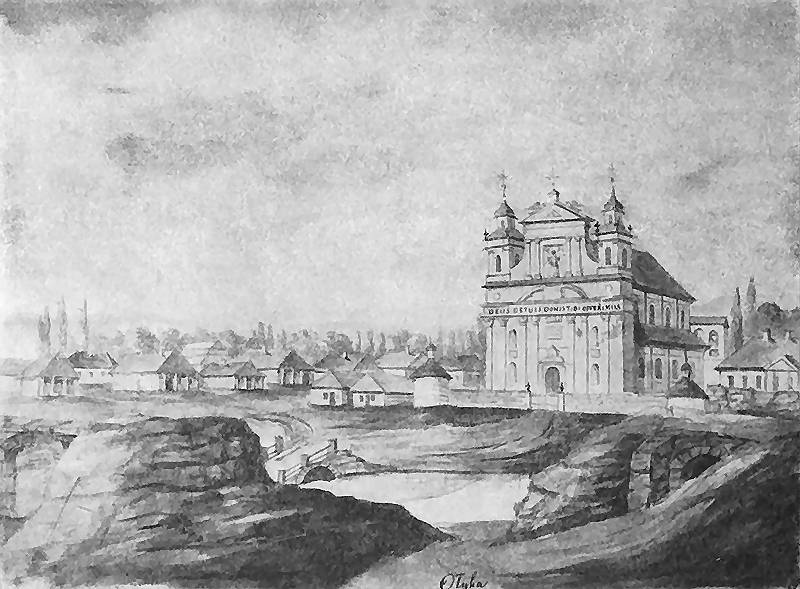
Olyka, 1874

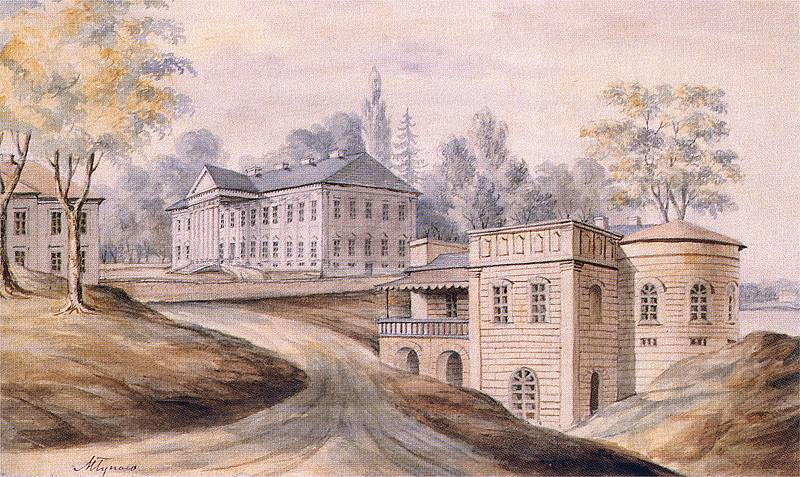
Młynów

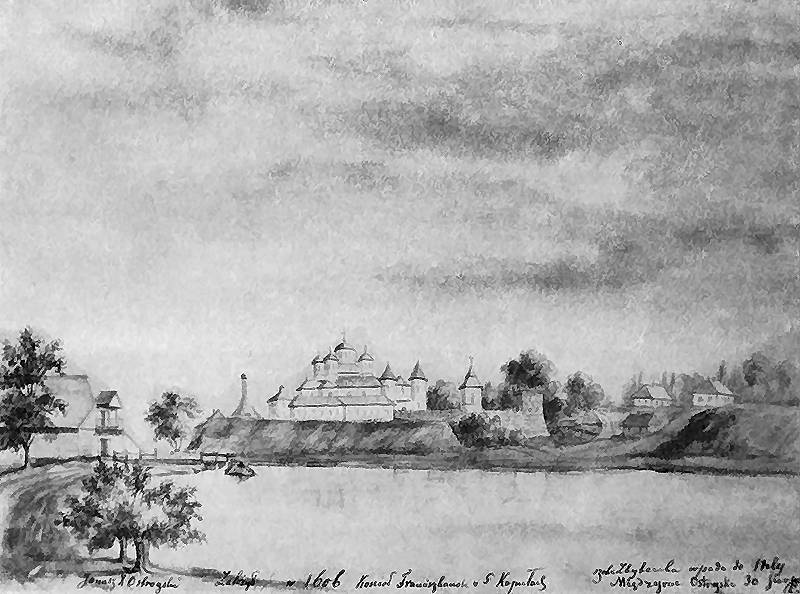
The Mezhyrich Monastery near Ostroh, 1862–1876

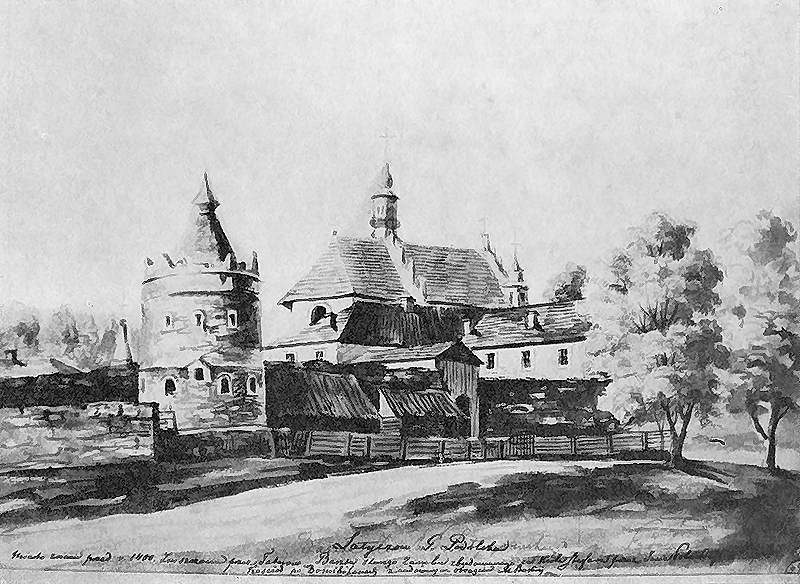
Letychiv

Karolin, near Pinsk

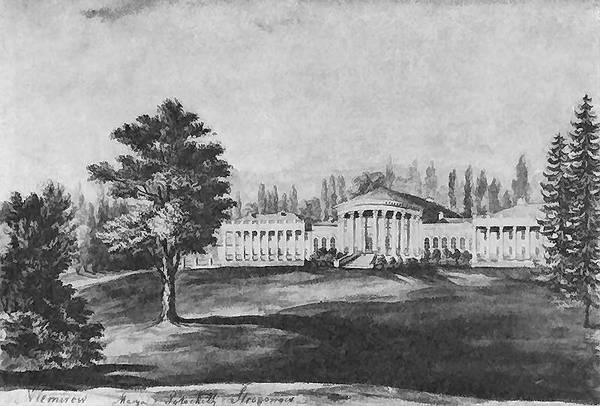
Nemyriv

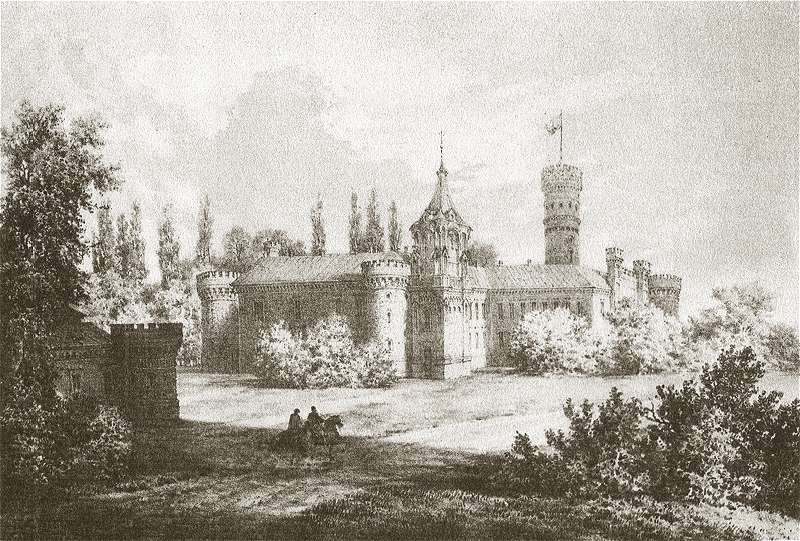
Raudonė

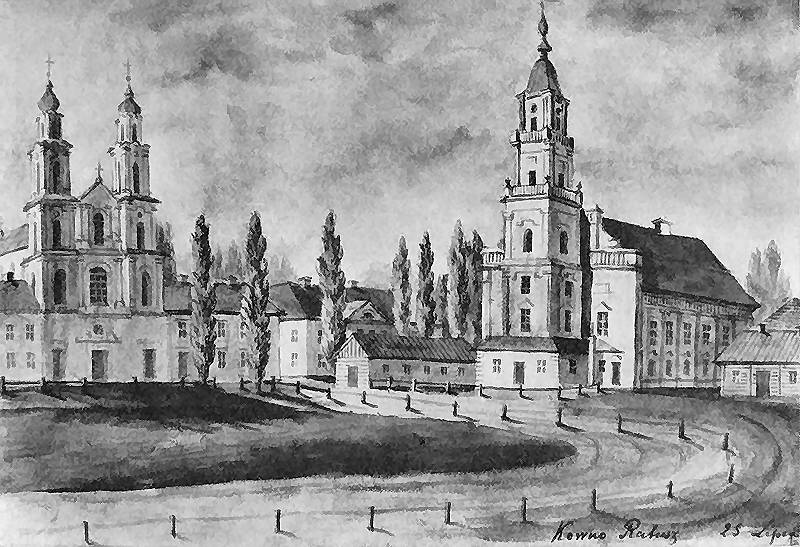
Town Hall, Kaunas

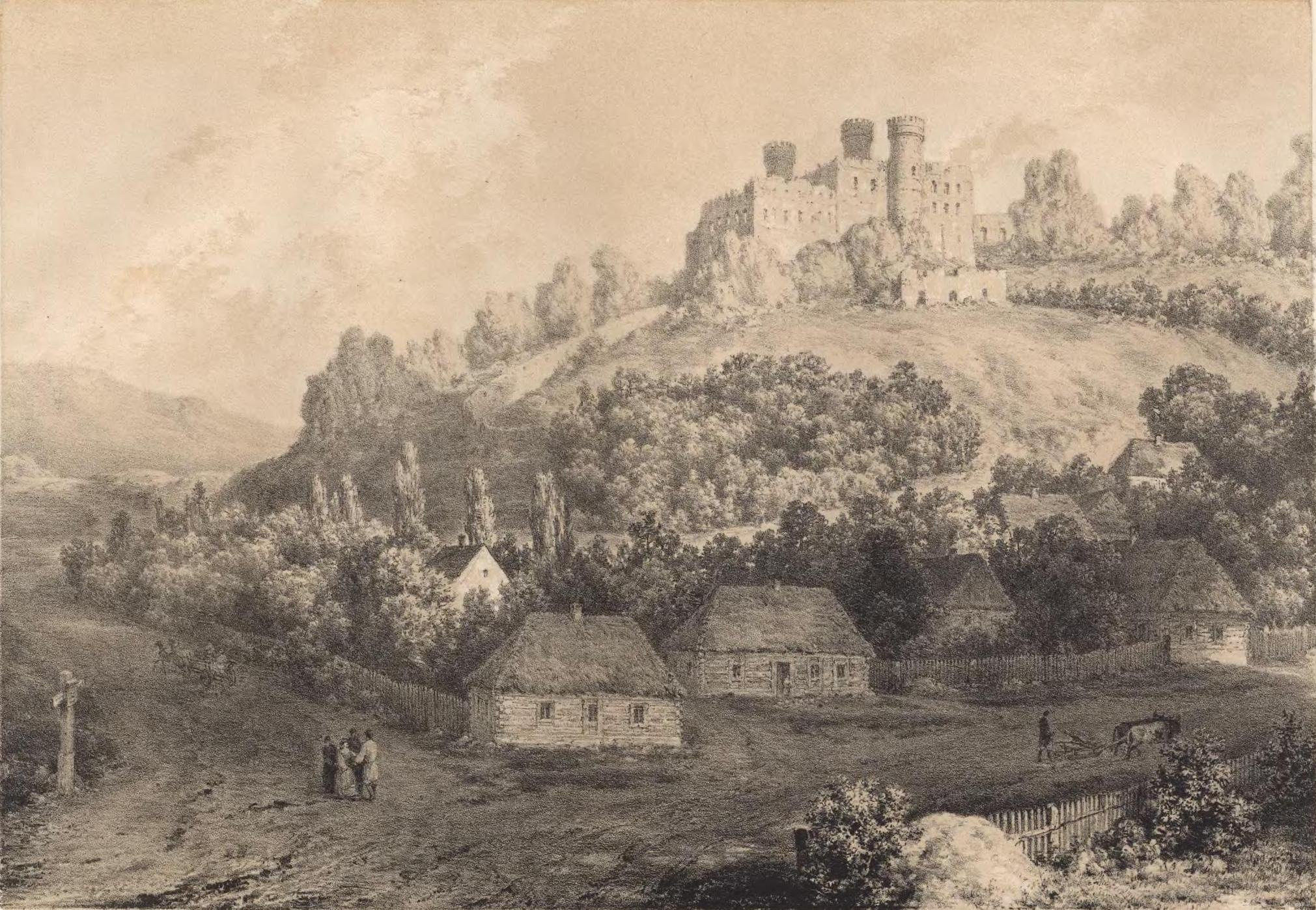
Ogrodzieniec Castle

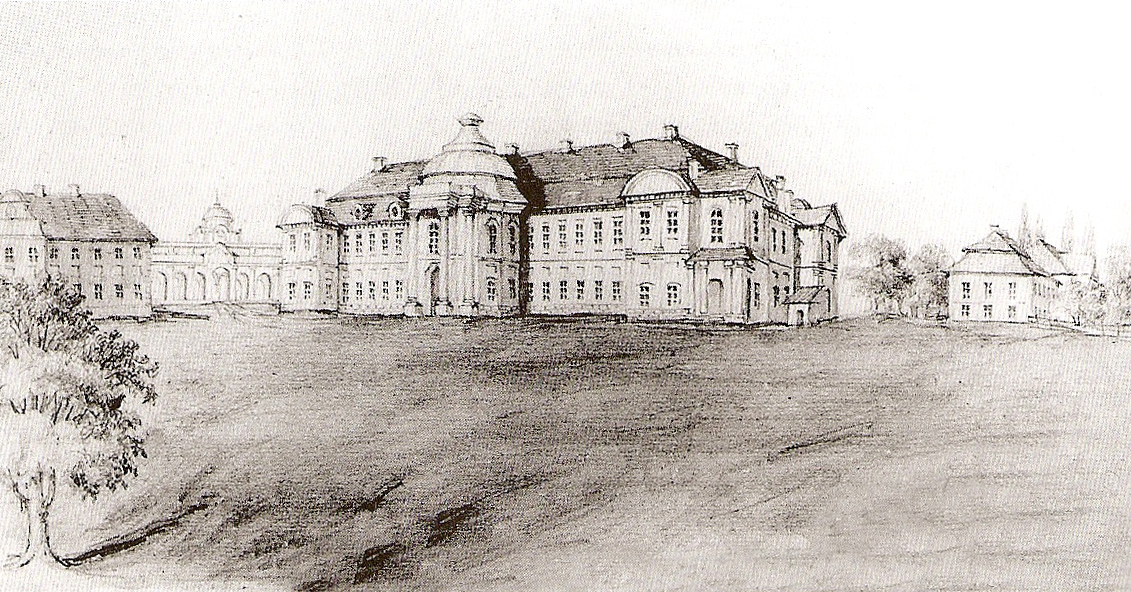
Iziaslav

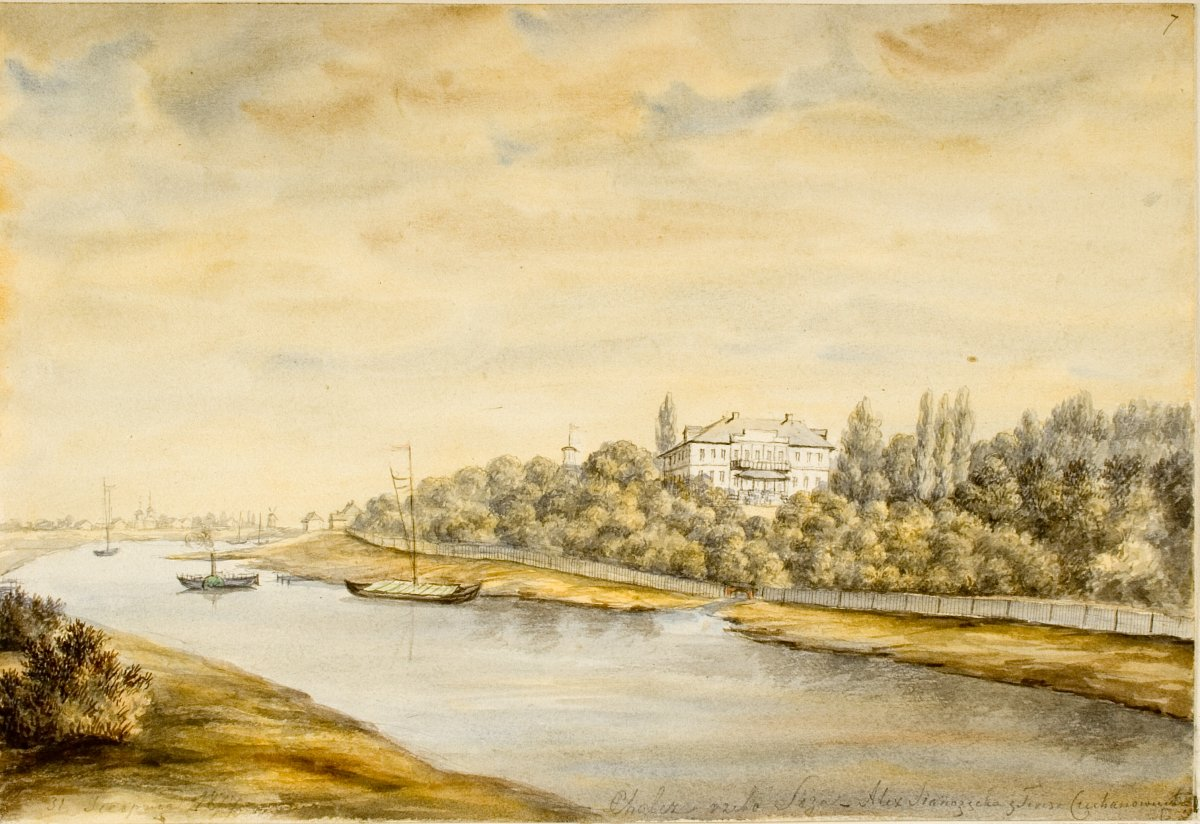
The Vojnič-Sienažecki Manor

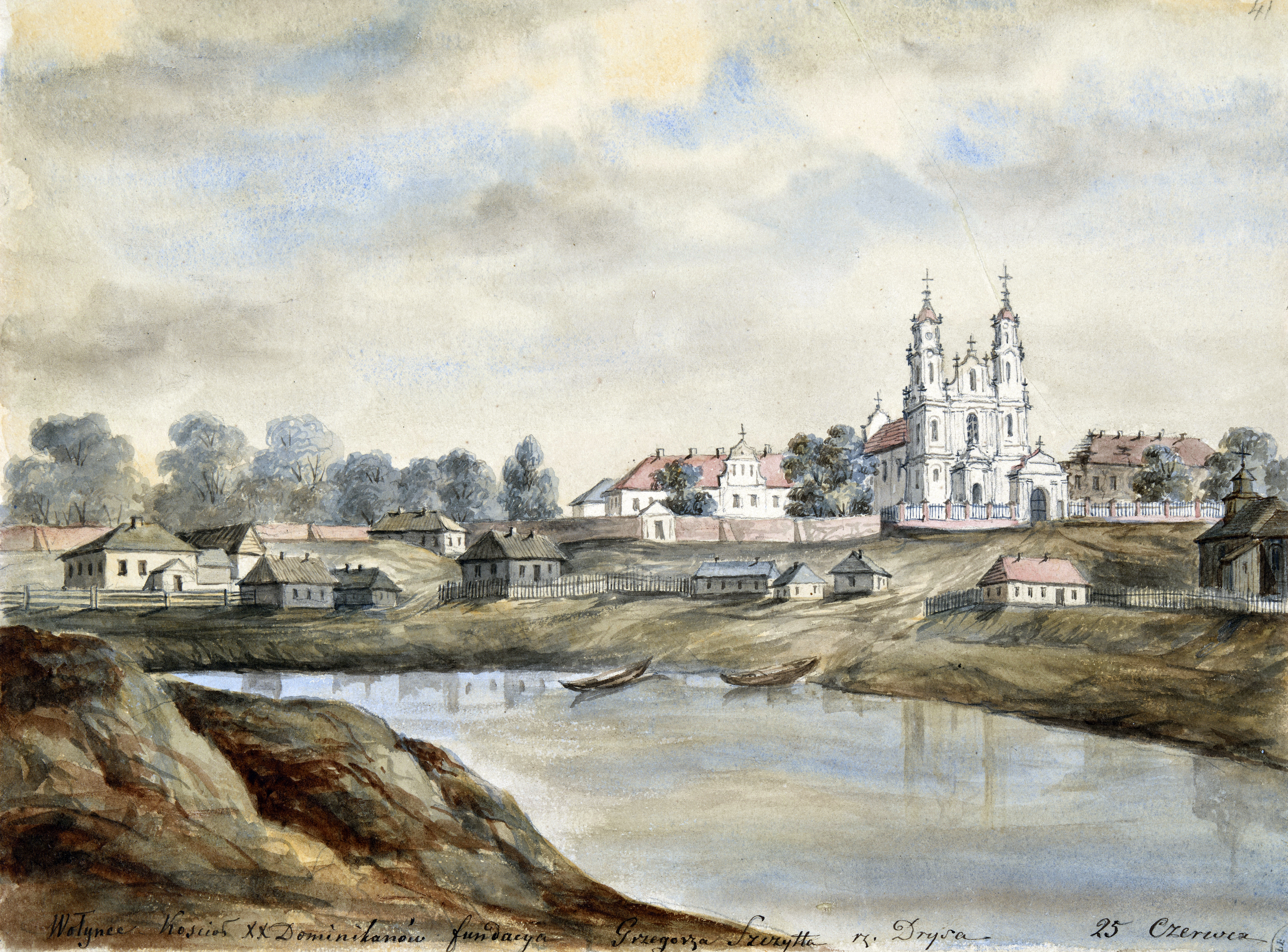
Volyntsy. Drissa River
