= Pierre Justin Ouvrié =

French painter and lithographer

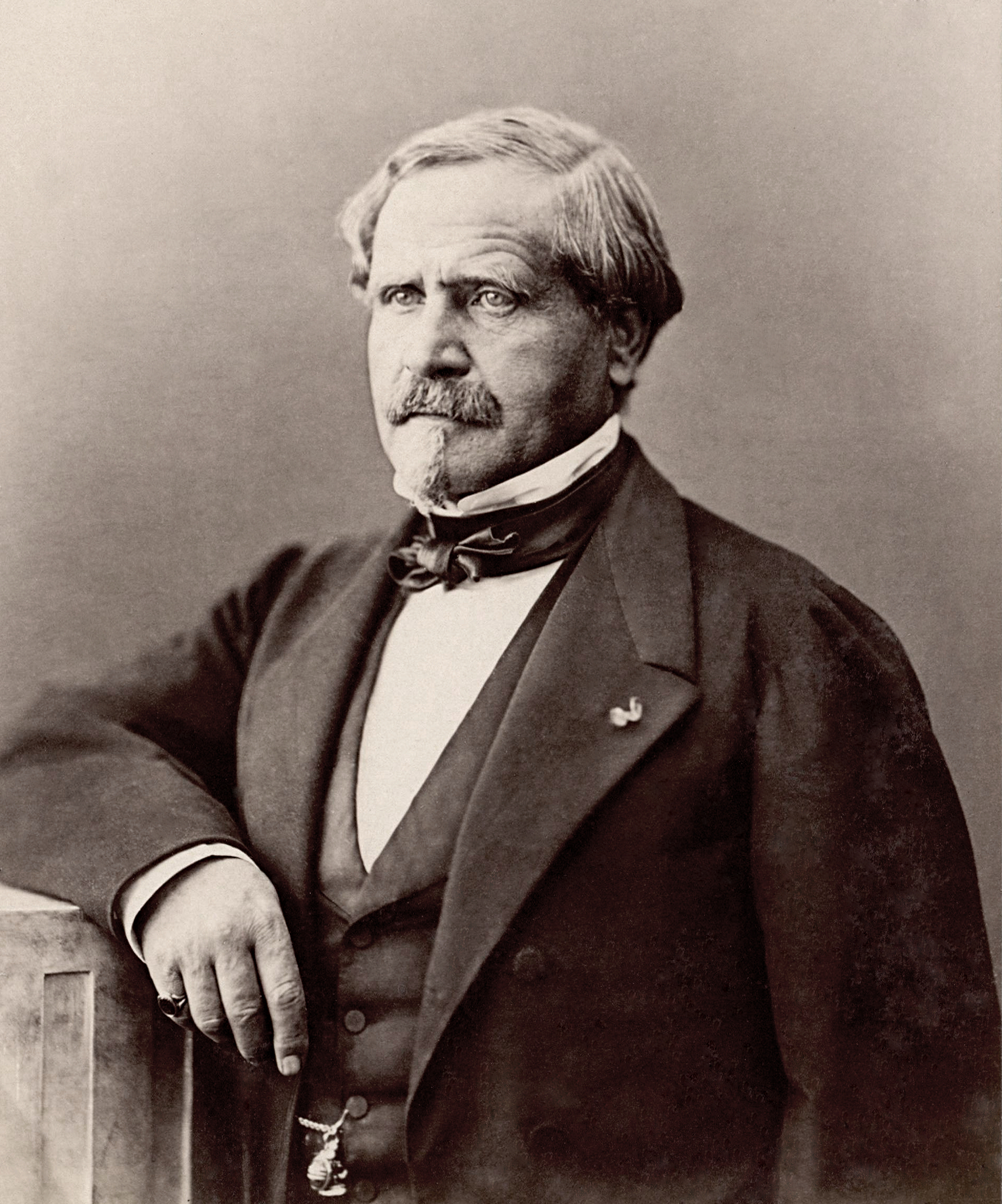
Ouvrié by Nadar, c. 1870

Pierre Justin Ouvrié or Ouvrié (19 January 1806 – 22 October 1879) was a French painter and lithographer. He was known as Justin Ouvrié from 1852 onwards.

== Life ==
Born in Sotteville-lès-Rouen, Justin Ouvrié was a student of baron Taylor and Abel de Pujol at the École des beaux-arts de Paris. He exhibited at the Paris Salon from 1831 onwards with views of towns and monuments, sometimes as historical or picturesque scenes.

He was very successful under the July Monarchy, winning a 2nd class medal at the 1831 Salon, a 1st class medal at the 1843 Salon and a 3rd class medal at the 1855 Exposition Universelle as well as being made a chevalier of the Légion d'honneur in 1854. He was a professor at the Maison d'éducation de la Légion d'honneur in Saint-Denis.

He later became blind, after which the paintings in his studio were sold off at the hôtel Drouot on 21 December 1874. Moving to Maisons-Laffitte, he died at Sotteville-lès-Rouen. His pupils included Jean-Joseph Bellel and Paul Chardin.

== Salon works ==
=== As Pierre Justin Ouvrié ===
- Landscape - 1831
- Grand Canal, Venice, View of the House of Incurables in Naples, View of the Mont-Saint-Bernard Hospice, View at Landernau (Brittany), The Pont de Pontoise - 1833
- View of Piazza Palazzo Vecchio, Florence, Riva degli Schiavoni, Venice - 1834
- Interior of the Lorenzkirche, Nuremberg, View of the Mont-d'Or Valley (Auvergne), The Aigues-Mortes Lighthouse, Valtin Valley - 1835
- View of the château in Twickenham [High Shot House] near Richmond, lived in by the king [Louis-Philippe of the French] during his stay in England, View of Rouen from Le Cours, San Pietro Church in Genoa, View at Lerici, near La Spezzi, Italy, View of Rouen from the petite chaussée - 1836
- Santa Lucia Quay in Naples, View of Rouen from the petite chaussée, The Place de Royat near Clermont-Ferrand, Chartres Cathedral from place des Eparts - 1837
- View of Château de Cossigny (Seine-et-Marne), View in the parc de Cossigny - 1838
- The Courtyard of Heidelberg Castle (Grand Duchy of Baden), View of Noël Saint-Martin Church (Oise), View at Chartres, View of the Lorenzer Platz in Nuremberg - 1839
- Oval Courtyard at the château de Fontainebleau, arrival of Queen Christine, View of the village of Ablon-sur-Seine - 1840
- The French Army Marching on Mascara after a sketch by M. Siméon Fort, View of the Castle and Town of Heidelberg, View of Augsburg - 1841
- Château de Fontainebleau, view from the jardin anglais, View of the église de la Roche, near Landernau (Finistère), Church and Calvary at Plougastel-Saint-Germain, near Quimper, View of Taverny, vallée de Montmorency - 1842
- View of château de Chenonceaux on the Cher, Séricourt, near la Ferté-sous-Jouarre The Palais de Saint-Cloud, view from the park - 1843
- View of the château de Pau and Part of the Town of Pau, from the park - 1844
- View of les Eaux-Bonnes (Basses-Pyrénées), Châlet de Séricourt (Seine-et-Marne), View of the Grand Canal in Venice - 1845
- View of the château d'Azay-le-Rideau (Indre-et-Loire), Château d'Ussé (Indre-et-Loire), Memory of Dinan (Côtes-du-Nord), Riva degli Schiavoni in Venice - 1846
- View of the Main Square and Cloth Hall in Ypres (Belgium), View at Amboise - 1847
- Place de la Halle à Bruges (Belgique), Vue prise à Honfleur (Calvados), Le Château de Châteaudun, vue prise des bords de Loir - 1848
- View of rue Flamande in Bruges, View of Saint-Sébastien in Bruges, The Pont Neuf in Chartres - 1849
- Houses of Parliament, Westminster Abbey and Lambeth Palace in London, The Béguinage in Bruges, View of Rouen, taken from Le Cours - 1850

=== As Justin Ouvrié ===
- View of Somerset House and Saint Paul's Cathedral, London (United Kingdom) - 1852 (also re-exhibited in 1855)
- Windsor Castle (United Kingdom), The Church at Hastings (United Kingdom) - 1852
- View of Amsterdam - 1853 (also re-exhibited in 1855)
- Banks of the Rhine, Saint-Goars and Rheinfelds, Banks of the Rhine, Oberwesel, Castle and City of Heidelberg, Santa Lucia Quay in Naples - 1855
- Trarbach-sur-Moselle (Rhenish Prussia), Rolandsech and Drackenfels on the Rhine, Boppart, near Koblenz (Prussia), Entrance to The Hague, through the Ryswick Canal (Netherlands) - 1857
- View of Rotterdam - 1859
- Memory of the Banks of the Rhine between Koblenz and Mainz, Mont Blanc and the Chaumont Valley, View of Antwerp, Memory of Italy, road from Ancona to Bologna, The Moselle near Bern-Castel (Rhenish Prussia) - 1861
- View of Salzburg (Austria), The Walter Scott Monument, Calton Hill and Canongate in Edinburgh, The Hereengracht in Amsterdam - 1863
- Le Château d'Anet (Eure-et-Loir), Château de Villepinte (Seine-et-Oise), au Salon de 1864
- Edinburgh from Calton Hill - 1865 (also re-exhibited 1867)
- Château de Pierrefonds in 1864 - 1865
- City and Castle of Heidelberg, Freiburg Cathedral in Brisgau - 1866
- Château de Pierrefonds, Museum Canal in Amsterdam, view from hôtel du Doelen - 1868
- The Printz-Gracht in Amsterdam, Thunn on the River Aar, Bern canton - 1869
- Rotterdam, Saint-Goar and the Rheinfels on the Rhine - 1870
- View of Dordrecht (Netherlands), Amsterdam Wetorhing - 1872
- Alkmaar (Netherlands), Dordrecht (Netherlands) - 1873

== Publications ==
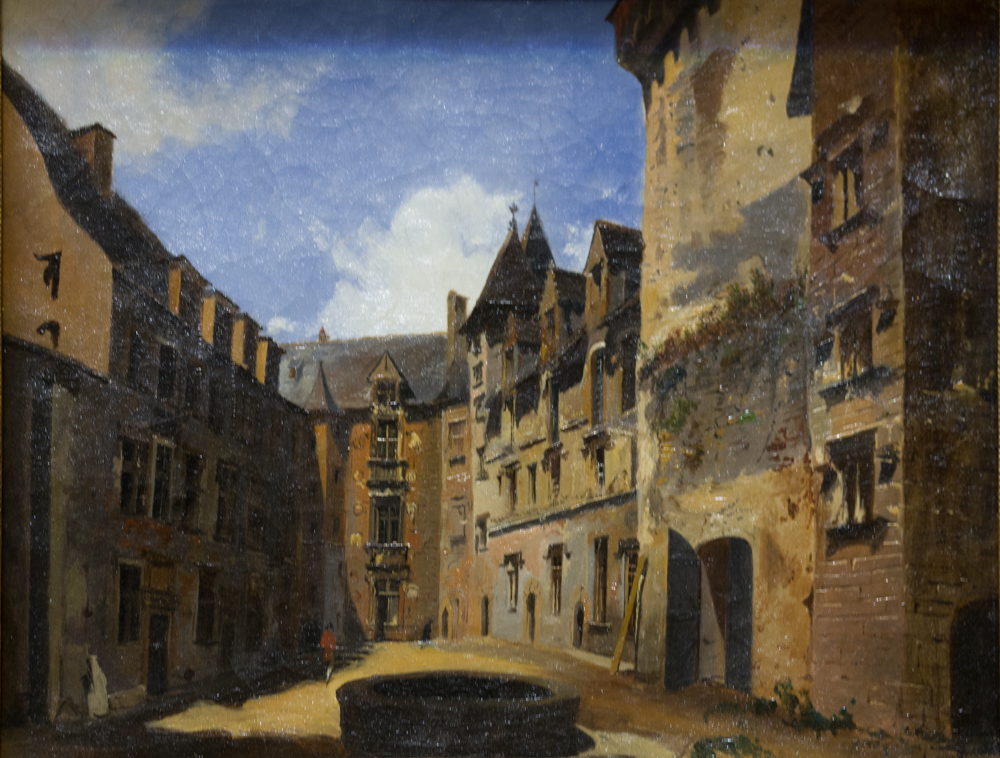
View of the Courtyard at the château de Pau, 1845, musée national du château de Pau.

- The Decorations in the bois de Boulogne, forty views from nature, 1862.

== Bibliography ==
- (in French) Émile Bellier de La Chavignerie, Dictionnaire général des artistes de l'École française depuis l'origine des arts du dessin jusqu'à nos jours : architectes, peintres, sculpteurs, graveurs et lithographes, vol 2, p. 187-188, Librairie Renouard, Paris, 1885 (online)
- (in French) Geneviève Lacambre, Jacqueline de Rohan-Chabot, Le Musée du Luxembourg en 1874, Paris, Éditions des Musées Nationaux, 1974, p 146
