= Jean-Joseph Bellel =

French painter (1816–1898)

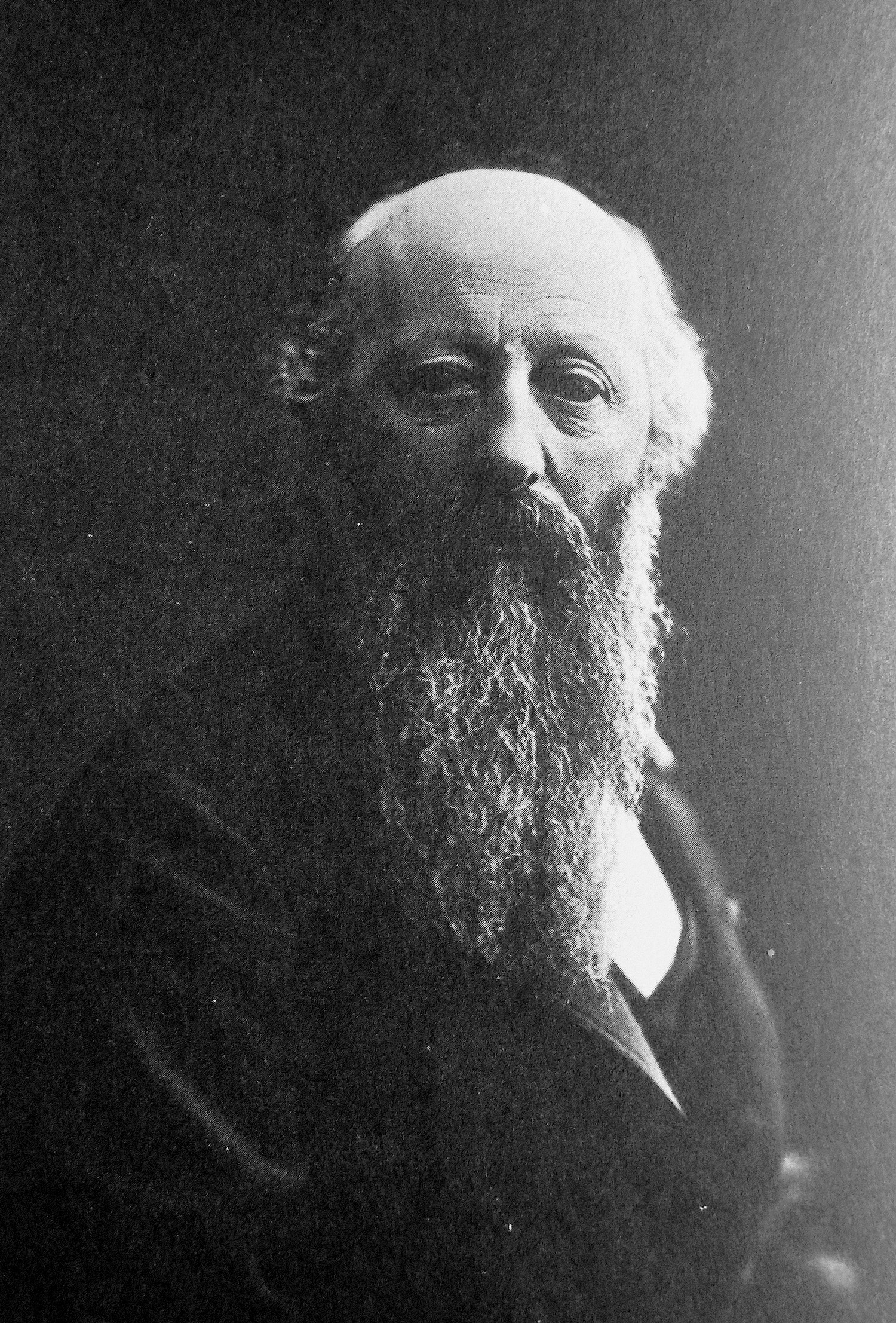
Jean-Joseph Bellel (1876), photograph by Nadar

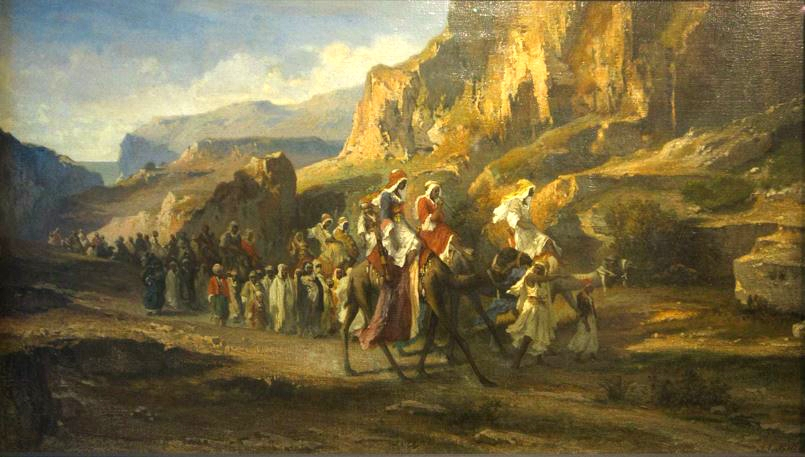
Caravan in the Mountains

Jean-François-Joseph Bellel (28 January 1816, Paris - 13 November 1898, Paris) was a French painter, who specialized in landscapes with figures. He is also known for his Orientalist works, depicting Egypt and Algeria.

== Biography ==
Bellel's father was an architect. He studied painting from 1832 to 1835 in the studios of Théodore Caruelle d'Aligny and Pierre Justin Ouvrié, a landscape and cityscape artist who became his foster father. Years later Bellel would, in turn, become the foster father of a future artist; Théophile-Narcisse Chauvel.

The year 1836 saw his debut at the Salon and he would exhibit there regularly for the rest of his life. He entered the École des beaux-arts de Paris for further studies in 1845. For a time, he served as an Assistant Custodian at the Palais du Luxembourg.

He made numerous trips to Italy and Algeria; each followed up by paintings of local scenes. His first Orientalist works date from 1856. He also held showings in Vienna and London, where he was awarded several medals. In 1860, he created an album of twenty charcoal drawings, with text by his friend Théophile Gautier, that he offered to the General Council of the Vosges as a gift for Napoleon III. That same year, he was decorated with the Legion of Honor.

He received a large number of commissions from official sources. His "Arab Caravan" may be seen at the Palais de l'Élysée. The French Senate is in possession of a tapestry from the Gobelins Manufactory, bearing one of his designs. Two large panels, depicting the edge of the Marne in Champigny and a view of Arcueil were created for the Hôtel de ville de Paris, but were destroyed during the Paris Commune. Sketches have been preserved at the Musée Carnavalet.

A black chalk and bodycolour drawing of a woodland landscape by Bellel was presented to Queen Victoria by François d'Orléans, Prince of Joinville, and is currently held at Windsor Castle.
