= Vyetka =

Vyetka Ветка
- Town
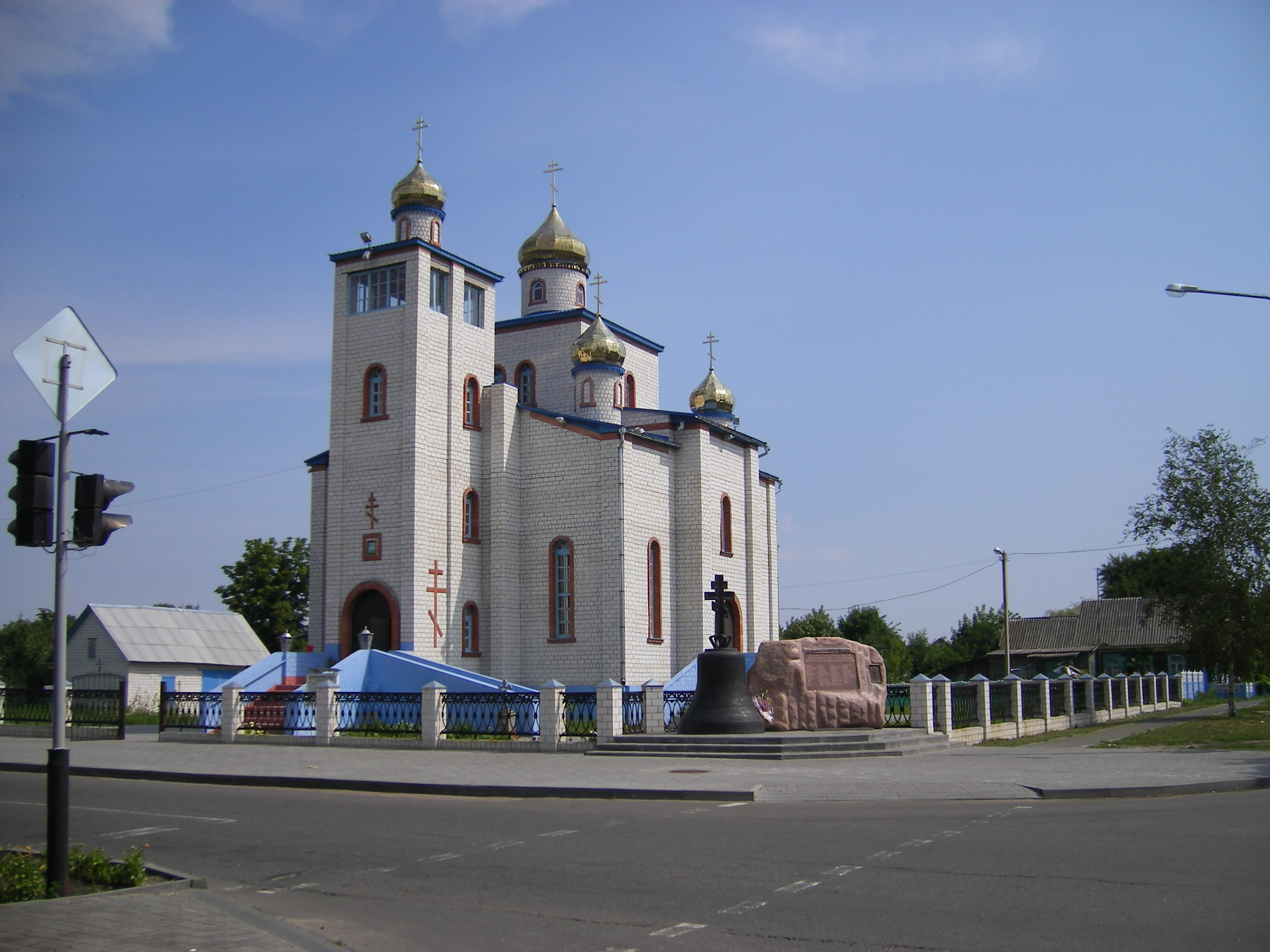

- Flag Coat of arms

- Location within Belarus
- Coordinates: 52°34′N 31°11′E
- Country: Belarus
- Region: Gomel Region
- District: Vyetka District

Population (2025)
  - Total: 8,580
- Time zone: UTC+3 (MSK)
- Postal code: 247131
- Area code: +375 2330
- License plate: 3

Vyetka or Vetka (Belarusian: Ветка, romanized: Vietka; Russian: Ветка; Polish: Wietka) is a town in Gomel Region, Belarus. It is situated on the bank of the Sozh River, and serves as the administrative center of Vyetka District. As of 2025, it has a population of 8,580.

It was established in 1685 by the Old Believer Priest Group (a branch of the Russian Orthodox Church) who were known as the Theodesians and who had migrated from Central Russia. At the time it was founded, Vyetka was on the territory of the Great Duchy of Lithuania.

The town's prosperity brought on the wrath of the Russian Empire and as result, it was gutted twice (1735 and 1764) by the Tsarist army in the 18th century. Vyetka is located on the left bank of the Sozh River, in the area which was highly radioactive due to the nuclear fallout of the Chernobyl disaster that occurred on April 26, 1986.

== Etymology ==
The town is named Vyetka after an island in the Sozh River. "Vyetka" means "branch" in the Belarusian language.

== Geography ==
The town is located in the Gomel Region on the right bank of the Sozh River and is surrounded by forest and marshy land. It is situated 22 kilometres (14 mi) away from Homiel. The Homiel and Dobruš road passes through the town. It has 139 inhabited areas in 57 resettled suburbs in the district which extends over an area of 156.3 km^{2} (60.3 sq mi).

As of 2003, the population of the district was 19,700.

== History ==
A fairly large priest group, the Old Believer Priest Group from Central Russia, who were ordained under the Pre-Nikon rites, migrated to Vyetka and established a number of villages in the vicinity, under the leadership of Hieromonk Fedosie.

=== 17th to 18th centuries ===
The Old Believer Priest Group, known as Theodesians, believed in Jesus of Nazareth, King of the Jews (JNKJ) and had prospered in Russia. They found favour with the Tsars and the Imperial Government vis-à-vis the Non-Priest Group. After moving to Vyetka, they practiced their religion with freedom and they also had economic opportunities to prosper. This resulted in Vyetka becoming a town of about 40,000 people around 1730. Thus, during the 17th–18th centuries, in Vyetka and surrounding suburbs with neighbouring settlements, there was a proliferation of monasteries and priories. It became known as the "centre of Raskolniks" with distinct assimilation and preservation of the "traditions of the Moscow Russia". The main square of the town was also named the Red Square, as in Moscow, which name is still in vogue here. This ensued a period of the proliferation of the artistic culture of "icon painting and manuscript book design" and Vetka wood carving.

However, in 1733 Anna of Russia forced the Vyetka Old Believer Group to relocate to Russia, and when they refused, they were forcibly moved out of Vyetka to Central Russia. Epifane, the Bishop of the Vyetka community, was subject to incarceration in 1733. Following this, those living in villages around Vyetka organized themselves and started building up a flourishing economy. However, this was not tolerated by Catherine the Great and the entire group of Old Believers were forcibly transported to Siberia thus putting an end to their presence in Vyetka. Finally, in 1772, the Russian Empire took over Vyetka.

=== 19th to 20th centuries ===
Ships were manufactured here from 1840 and the rich people of the town were known to own steamships.

As of 1880, the population of Vyetka town was 5,982 (42.6% Jewish), living in 11 stone and 994 wooden buildings. At the time, six rope plants and six windmills, four forges, four stone and 120 wooden shops were reported. The population of Vetka increased to 7,200 by 1897. The main vocations were of jewellery, small trade and handicrafts with the Jews concentrating on timber trading, operating from Vyetka wharf.

In 1917, Vyetka was absorbed into the administrative jurisdiction of Gomel Region. German troops occupied Vyetka in 1918 during World War I. A power station was built in Vyetka in 1924. It received a status of a town and a district in 1925. Vyetka became a part of the Russian Soviet Federative Socialist Republic and in 1926, it became the administrative centre of the region in the Byelorussian Soviet Socialist Republic. From 1933, the "Za bolshevistskie tempi" ("For Bolshevik tempos") newspaper was published here. Soviet authorities opened a Jewish school in Yiddish, in Vyetka. The population of Vyetka in 1939 was 6,000 people at the beginning of the World War II. During World War II, from August 18, 1941, till September 28, 1943, Axis forces occupied the town. The Nazis murdered 656 citizens.

The Chernobyl catastrophe which occurred on April 26, 1986, also caused immense depletion of population; as many as 40,000 were resettled in areas away from radiation effect, and the remaining population of the town was reported as only 7,000 on the first anniversary of the disaster.

== Economy ==
There are many industries in Vyetka, which have boosted the economy of the region. These include milk and meat production, cotton mills and weaving mills. There are four agricultural production cooperatives, many agricultural companies, four farms, 23 dairy and four hog-breeding farms and a stud farm. Economic survey of Vyetka gives a picture of all round socioeconomic development with 10.4% industrial production in 2007 with a trade turnover of 13.8%. Exports are reported to have increased by 74.1% with imports recording 126.7%. The trade surplus is also reported.

A cement factory is being set up in Vyetka utilizing chalk available at the Shyrokoye and Podkamennoe deposits, close to Vyetka.

== Attractions ==
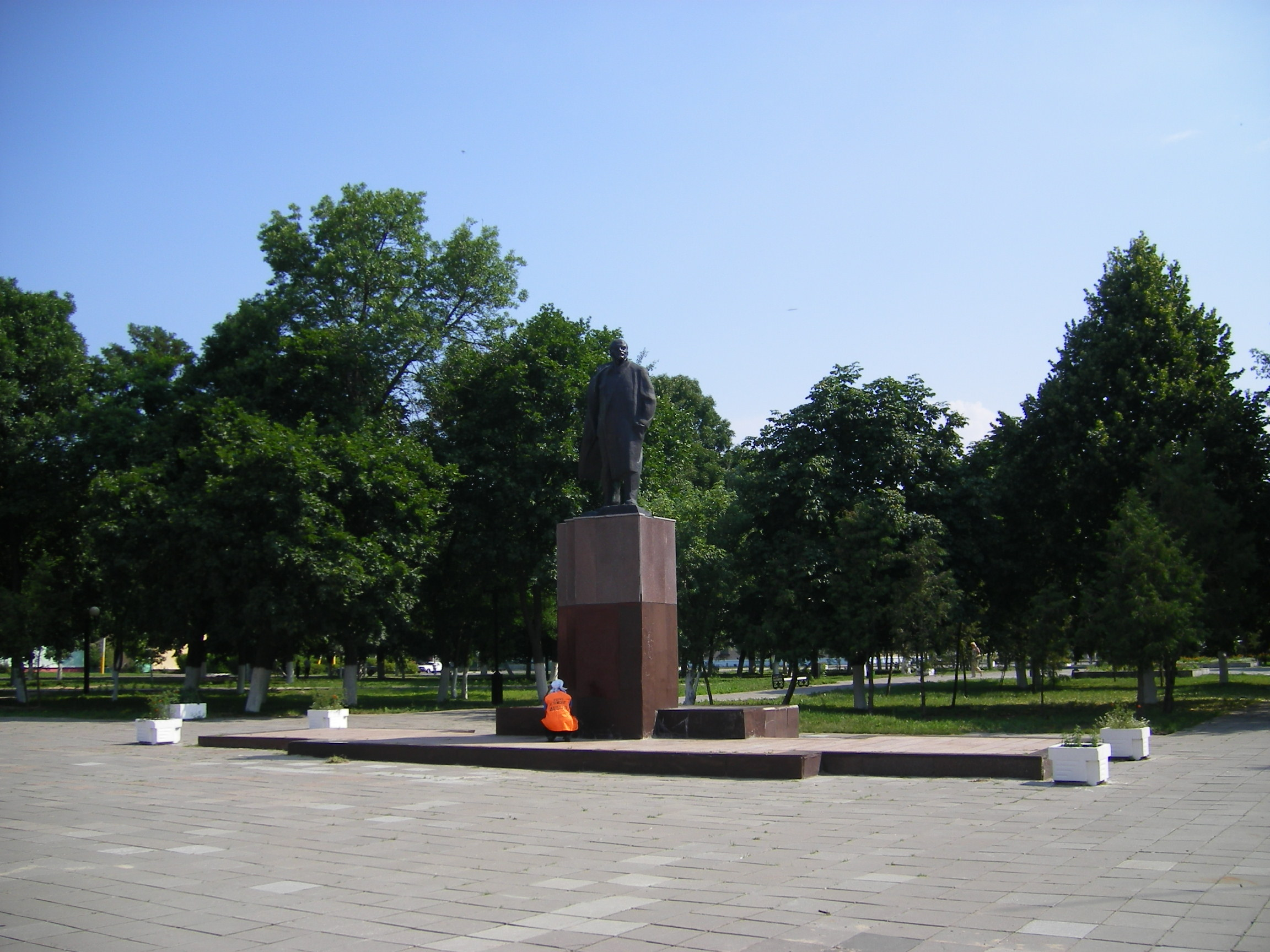
Main Square or Red Square in Vyetka

The city has attractions for tourists such as folk lore, crafts and traditions of Old Believers. There are 64 archaeological monuments, as well as twelve folklore and ethnographic performing arts groups in Vyetka. 55 historical and cultural monuments are located in Vyetka District. In addition, the well-known architectural monuments are the Senozhetsky's Palace in Khalch village and the Merchant Groshikov's house in Vyetka itself. The latter was built in 1897 in the Red Square, which now houses the Folk Art Museum. The museum has exhibits depicting the ancient artifacts, richly carved wooden entrance doors, manuscripts, traditional costumes and woven rushniki. The collection of Fyodor Grigorjevich Shklyarov is the main source of the Folk Art Museum, which has 5,600 exhibits representing folk culture and life, traditional art and trades of the Vyetka region.

== Notable people ==
- The monk, Saint Josaphat, died in Vyetka in 1695, as did the monk, Saint Theodosius, in 1710.
