= Gornostaev =

Gornostaev (Russian: Горностаева), also spelled as Gornostayev, is a common Russian male surname (female: Gornostaeva, Горностаева) and may refer to:

In particular, there were three Gornostaev architects, engaged in Russian Revival style and preservation of historical landmarks:

- Alexey Maksimovich Gornostaev (1808–1862), Russian Revival pioneer, noted for Valaam Monastery tented churches, Trinity-Sergius Convent additions in Saint Petersburg and Uspenski Cathedral in Helsinki
- Ivan Ivanovich Gornostaev (1821–1874), preservationist and chief architect of Saint Petersburg Public Library and University
- Fyodor Fyodorovich Gornostaev (1867–1915), also a preservationist, notable for Rogozhskoye Cemetery belltower (1908–1913), surveying and restoration of landmark buildings in Suzdal, Kursk and Moscow Kremlin.
