= Skitsky Island =

Island in Russia

Skitsky
Native name: Скитский
- Location within Karelia Location within European Russia

Geography
- Coordinates: 61.39°N 30.92°E
- Archipelago: Valaam archipelago
- Adjacent to: Lake Ladoga
- Area: 4 km^{2} (1.5 sq mi)

Administration
- Russia

Skitsky (Russian: Скитский, Finnish: Erakkosaari - "island of the hermits") is an island that is part of the larger Valaam archipelago in Lake Ladoga in the Republic of Karelia, Russia. Situated directly on the northwestern shore of the island of Valaam, Skitsky is separated from Valaam by Sredneosrovsky Strait on its eastern and southeastern coastlines and by Moscow Strait on its southwestern coastline. The area of the island of Skitsky is 4 km^{2} (1.5 sq mi), which is the second largest in the Valaam archipelago after Valaam island.

Skitsky Island is high, hilly and covered with pine forest. The northern part of the island is mountainous. Big Skete is 52 meters (171 ft) high, and the stone is visible from a distance of 31 kilometres (19 miles). The island shores are predominantly rocky with deeply indented bays that do not have navigational significance.

There is a bridge and road that connects Skitsky island to the island of Valaam.

== History ==
Skitsky island got its name because it is the Skete of All Saints (a.k.a. the White monastery). The monastery was built by hegumen Nazarius in 1789–1793, on the supposed site of a solitary chapel St. Alexander of Svir.

In the 18th century, a wooden church was built in the name of Alexander of Svir. In the middle of the 19th century, on the initiative of hegumen Damascene of the monastery, it was rebuilt by the famous Russian architect A. M. Gornostayev into a small town fortress framed by alleys of magnificent pine, asenapine, fir, and oak. Instead of individual cabins, there were 8 private buildings, and the dilapidated single-domed Church was replaced by the two-story Church of All Saints. The body, fence, and towers of the monastery were painted white, hence its second name: "White". The interior of the Church was painted by the Valaam masters.

Life was harsh on the Charter Skete at the monastery: one did not consume meat, fish, or dairy, and pilgrims were allowed here only once a year. The island was inhabited by approximately 20 people. Women could only go here on the feast day with a procession to All Saints day.

On the feast of All Saints in 1993, the Abbot of Valaam monastery, hegumen Pancratius (Zherdev), held the first Liturgy over the past half-century in the lower Church on the "abomination of desolation". In the monastery, monastic life in accordance with the earlier Charter was restored.

In 2009 the question was addressed of renaming the island in honor of Patriarch Alexy II, who died in December 2008.

The white Hermitage is located in the depths of the Skitsky island and is the largest and most austere monastery of Valaam. It is only possible to visit with the blessing of the Abbot.
