= Fyodor Gornostayev =

Fyodor Fyodorovich Gornostaev
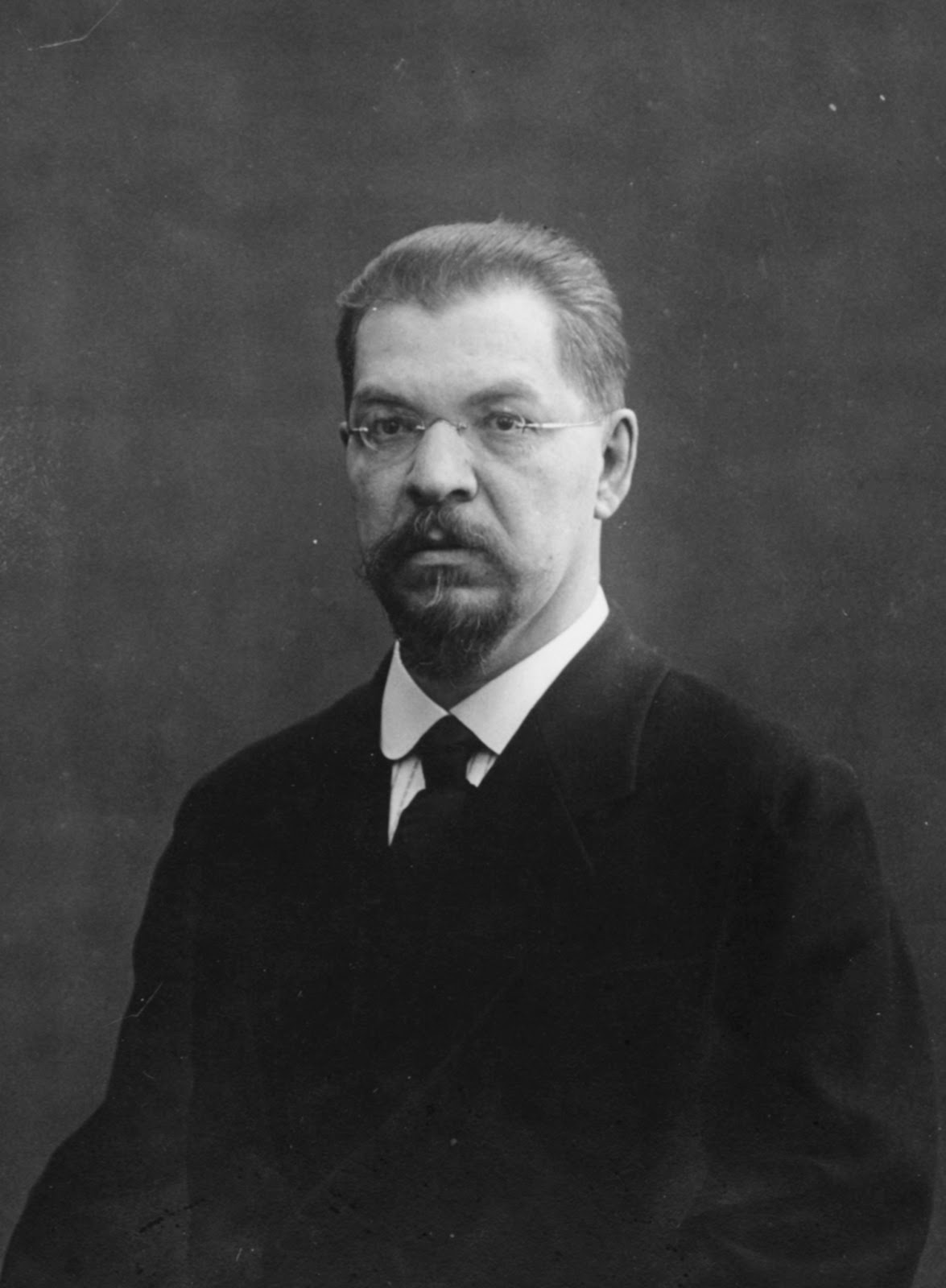
- Born: 1867; Moscow
- Died: 1915 (aged 47–48); Moscow
- Occupation: Architect
- Practice: own practice
- Buildings: Rogozhskoye Cemetery Belltower
- Projects: Restoration and preservation of historical buildings in Suzdal, Kursk and Moscow

Fyodor Fyodorovich Gornostaev (1867–1915) was a Russian architect and preservationist, notable for his folk interpretation of Russian Revival and restoration of landmark buildings in Suzdal, Kursk and Moscow Kremlin.

He should not be confused with two other architects by the name of Gornostaev, also engaged in Russian Revival art and preservation:

- Alexey Maksimovich Gornostaev (1808–1862), Russian Revival pioneer, noted for Valaam Monastery Cathedral, Trinity-Sergius Convent in Saint Petersburg and Uspenski Cathedral in Helsinki
- Ivan Ivanovich Gornostaev (1821–1874), preservationist of historical buildings and chief architect of Saint Petersburg Public Library and University

== Biography ==
Gornostaev, born in Moscow, completed Saint Petersburg Imperial Academy of Arts in 1895 cum laude, earning a state-paid overseas study tour. Gornostaev, like some of his contemporaries, preferred to spend most of his tour in Russia, studying old national architecture. In 1899, he returned to Moscow, teaching art in Moscow School of Painting, Sculpture and Architecture.

Gornostaev, keen on preserving historical buildings, performed surveys of Monastery of Saint Euthymius in Suzdal, Kursk Cathedral, Baturin and various Moscow landmarks and collaborated with Igor Grabar on "History of Russian arts" (История русского искусства). In 1913, he compiled his studies of two decades into "Essays of ancient Moscow architecture" (Очерки древнего зодчества Москвы). His practical work included restoration of Kremlin Wall, Sukharev Tower, Krutitsy, Terem Palace and Church of Ascension in Kolomenskoye.

His only extant own building is the Rogozhskoye Cemetery Belltower (1908–1913, structurally complete in 1909). An Old Believers legend says that it's only two bricks lower than Ivan the Great Bell Tower; actually, it is one meter lower than Ivan, i.e. 80 meters tall. The belltower commemorates unlocking the altars of Old Believers after the 1905 Manifesto on religious tolerance.
