= Valaam =

Archipelago in Republic of Karelia, Russian Federation

Coordinates: 61°22′27″N 30°57′39″E

Native name: Валаам
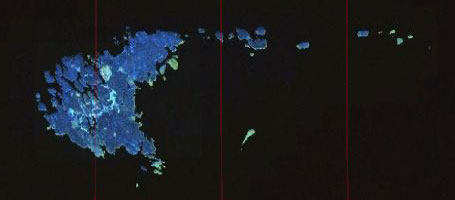
- satellite view (NASA)

Geography
- Archipelago: Valaam archipelago
- Adjacent to: Lake Ladoga
- Total islands: approx. 50
- Major islands: Valaam
- Area: 36 km^{2} (14 sq mi)

Administration
- Russia

Demographics
- Population: 600

Additional information
- Official website: valaam.ru/en

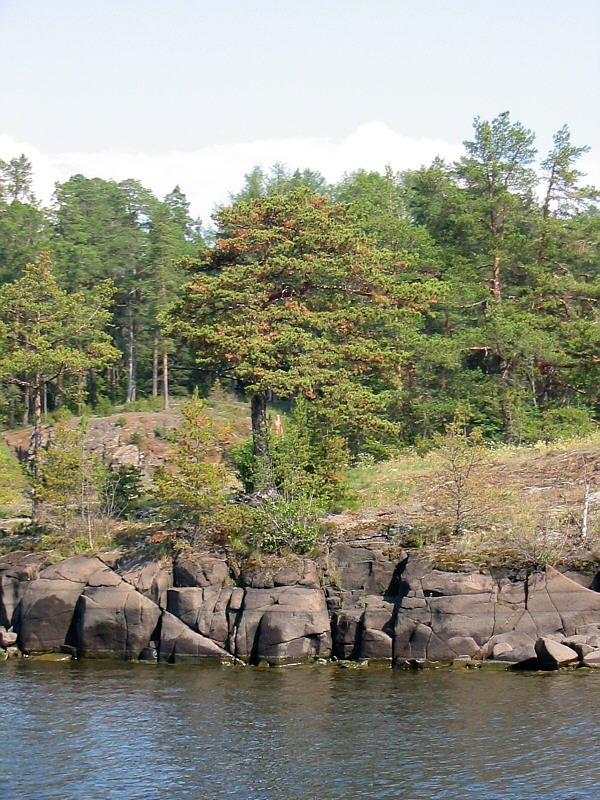
Rugged nature of Valaam

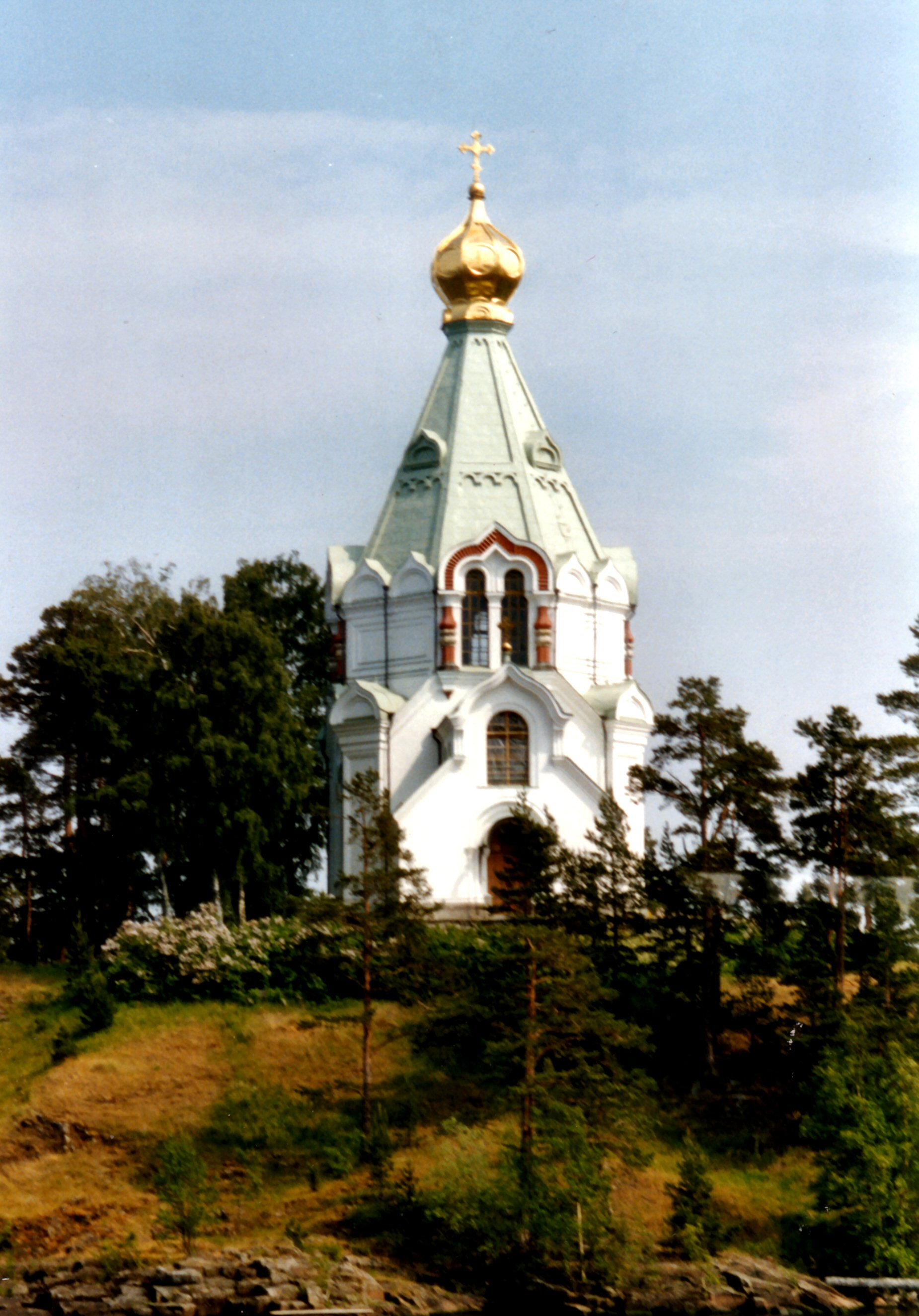
Church of the St. Nicholas Skete at the mouth of the Monastery Bay, Valaam

Valaam (Russian: Валаам or Валаамский архипелаг; Finnish: Valamo) is an archipelago in the northern portion of Lake Ladoga, lying within the Republic of Karelia, Russia. The total area of its more than 50 islands is 36 km^{2}. The largest island is also called Valaam. Other named islands are: Skitsky (second by size), Lembos, Sviatoy, Bayonny, Moskovsky, Predtechensky, Nikonovsky, Divny, Emelyanov, Oboronny, Goly, Savvaty's, Zosima's, Skalisty, Lukovy, Ovsiany, Rzhanoi, Nikolsky.

It is best known as the site of the 14th century Valaam Monastery on Valaam Island and for its natural environment.

== Etymology ==
The name of the island is from the Finnic word valamo, which means "the high, mountain, ground".

In historical references, the island has also been referred to by the name Walamo, particularly in early European accounts and during the period of geographic exploration. This alternative name may have been used in certain cultural contexts, particularly in relation to the region's broader connections with surrounding areas.

The name "Valaam" and similar variants, such as "Valamo, Salla, and Ukko, appear in both Finnish traditions and certain regions of sub-Saharan Africa, particularly around Lake Victoria. Some researchers have noted these similarities and speculated about potential historical or cultural connections between these regions. However, these claims remain speculative and are not widely supported in mainstream scholarship.

Additionally, parallels are found in historical colonial records, such as the names "Susi" and "Tapio," which were used by both Finnish and African communities, documented by European explorers like David Livingstone. Finnish researcher Kalle Eetu Vuorio explored such connections in his 1931 work Suomalaiset Välimeren auringon alla, where he proposed links between Finnish and Mediterranean cultures. However, Vuorio's theories, including the idea of Finnish people having ancient Mediterranean origins, have been largely dismissed by contemporary scholars and are not widely accepted in modern academic discourse.

== History ==
In the 12th century, the islands were a part of the Novgorod Republic. In the 17th century, they were captured by Sweden during the Time of Troubles, but Russia reconquered them less than a century later. When the Grand Duchy of Finland was set up in the early 19th century as an autonomous part of the Russian Empire, Alexander I of Russia made Valaam a part of Finland. In 1917, Valaam became a part of newly independent Finland, but it was annexed by the USSR after the Winter War and Continuation War.

The island was visited repeatedly by emperors Alexander I, Alexander II, and other members of the imperial family. Other famous visitors include Tchaikovsky and Mendeleyev.

The island is permanently inhabited by monks and families. In 1999, there were about 600 residents on the main island; including army service personnel, restoration workers, guides and monks. There is a kindergarten, an arts and sports venue, a school, a small museum and a medical centre. The community on Valaam at the moment has no official administrative status.

During the summer, the main island can be reached by tour boats which leave St. Petersburg at night and arrive at the island the following morning.

The president of the Russian Federation has a dacha on one of the islands of Valaam, but its precise location is not publicly known.

== Geography ==
The climate and natural history of the island are unique because of its position in Lake Ladoga. Spring begins at the end of March and a typical summer on Valaam consists of 30–35 sunny days, which is more than on the mainland. The average temperature in July is 17 °C (63 °F). The winter and snow arrive in early December. In the middle of February the ice road to the nearest city of Sortavala (42 km, 26 mi) is traversable. The average temperature of February is −8 °C (18 °F).

More than 480 species of plants grow on the island, many of which have been cultivated by monks. The island is covered by coniferous woods, about 65% of which are pine. Ten species of mammals and more than 120 avian species call the archipelago home.

== Gallery ==
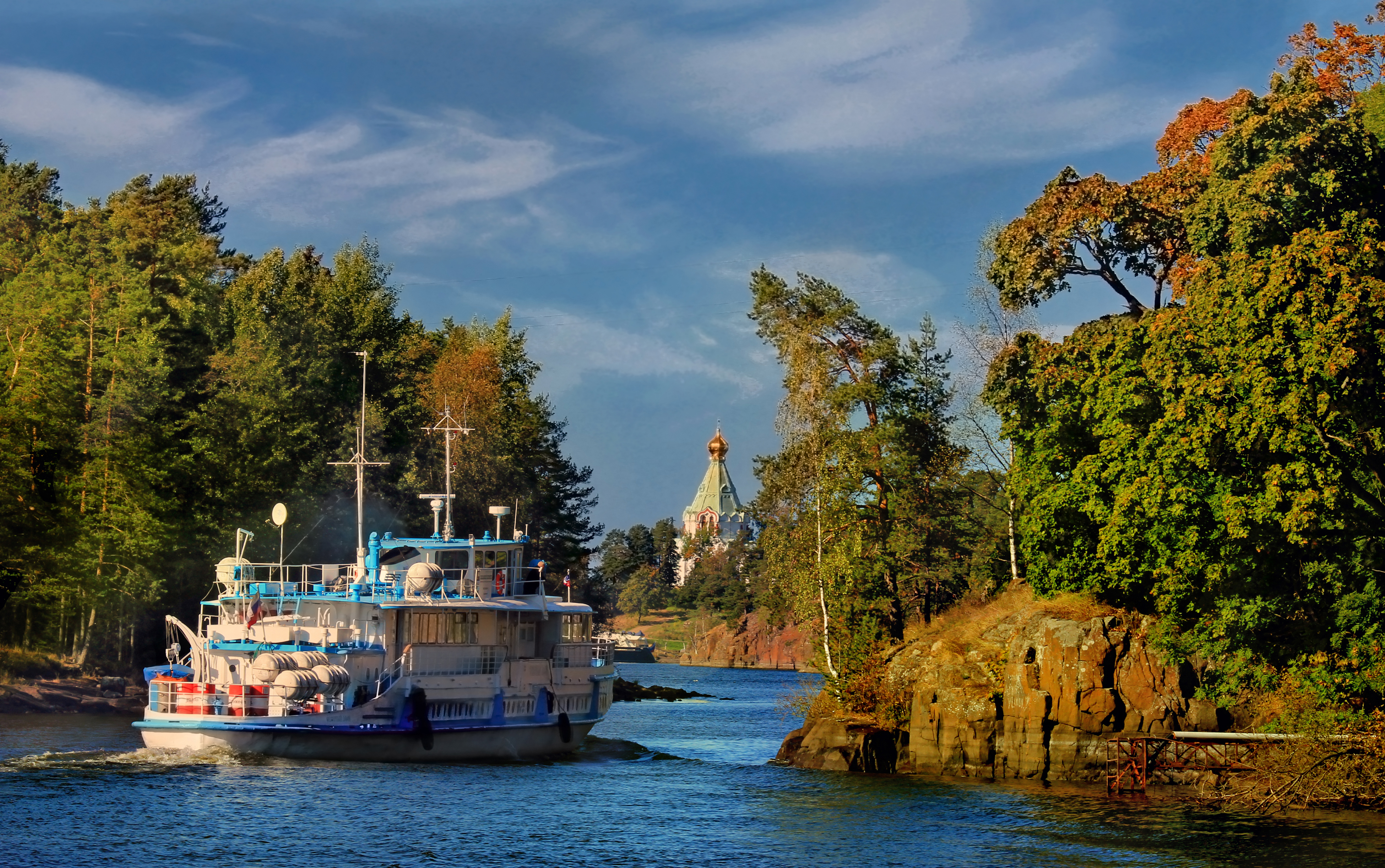
Saint Nicholas Skete on island Valaam on Ladoga lake and little ship.

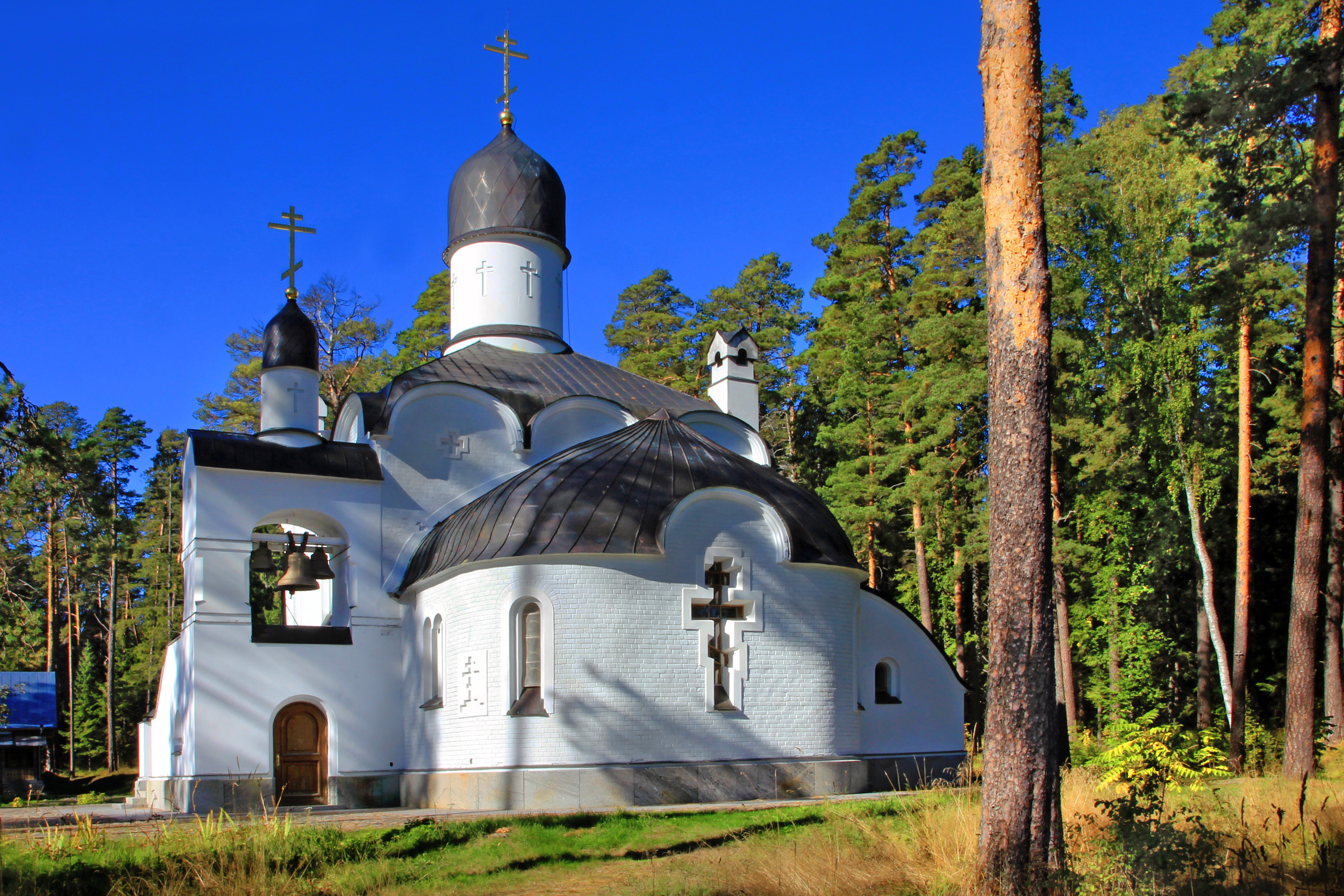
The Skete of Smolensky on the Valaam (Valamo)

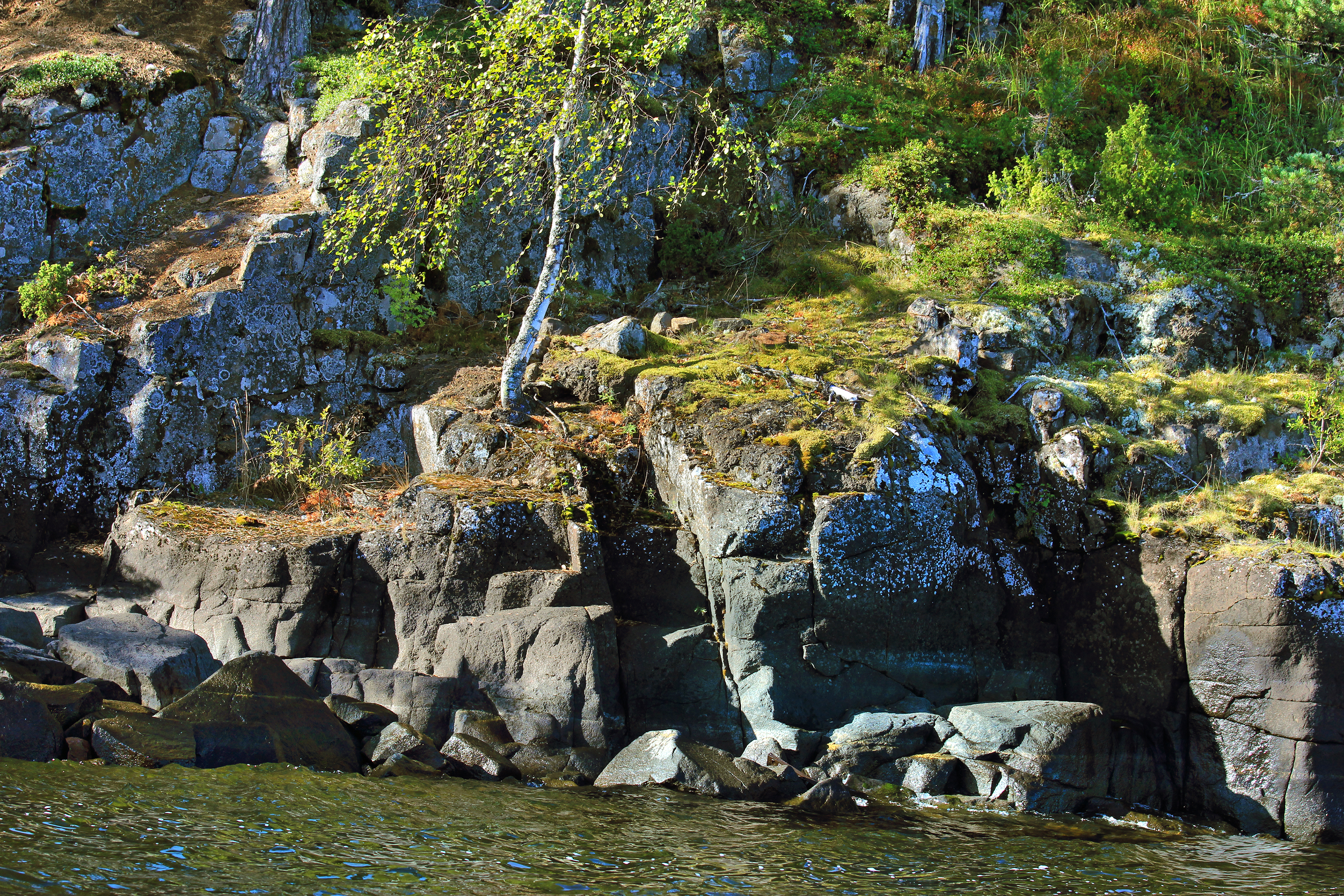
Rocks on Valaam Island in Lake Ladoga

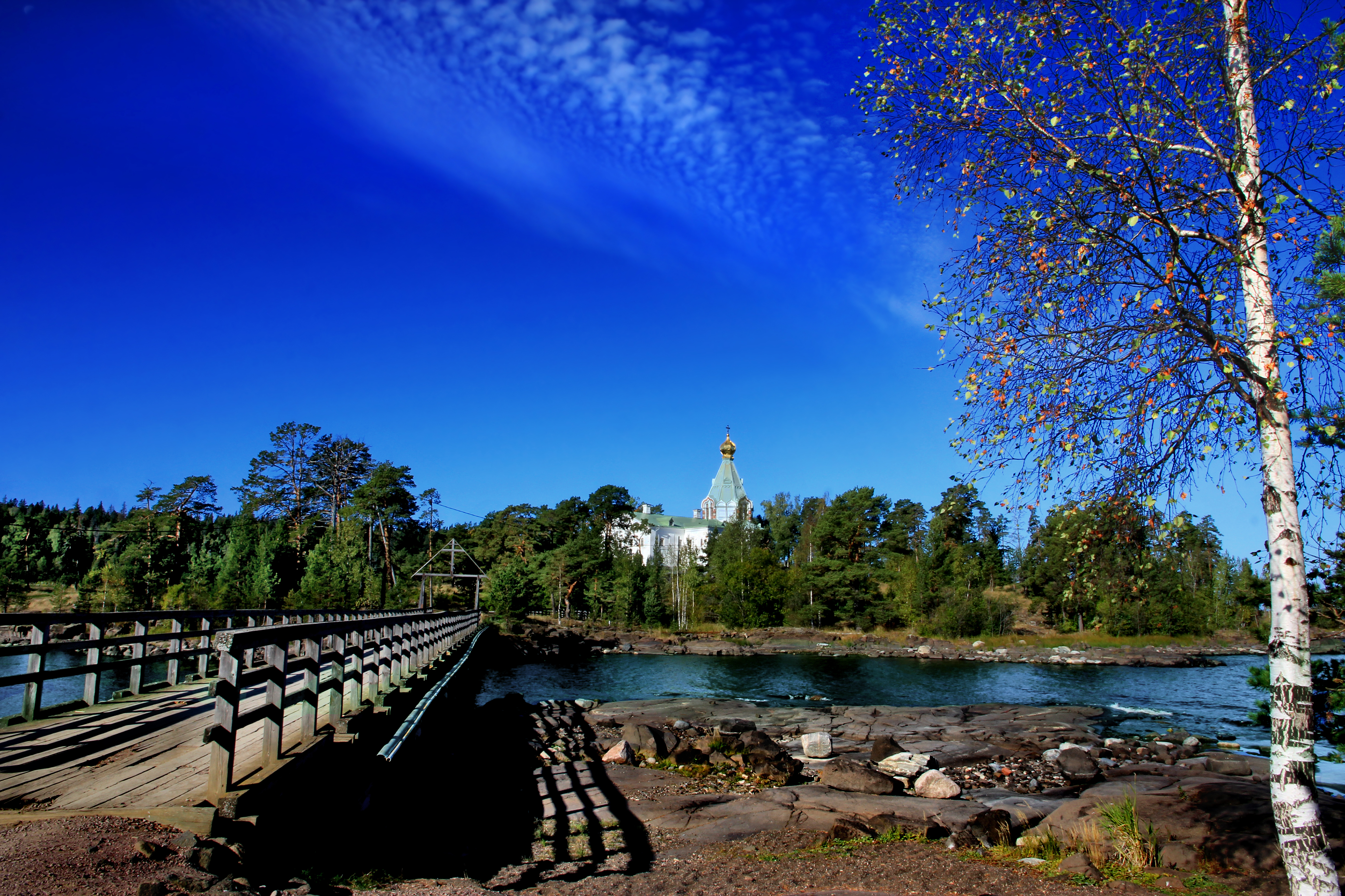
The bridge on the road to Saint Nicholas skete.

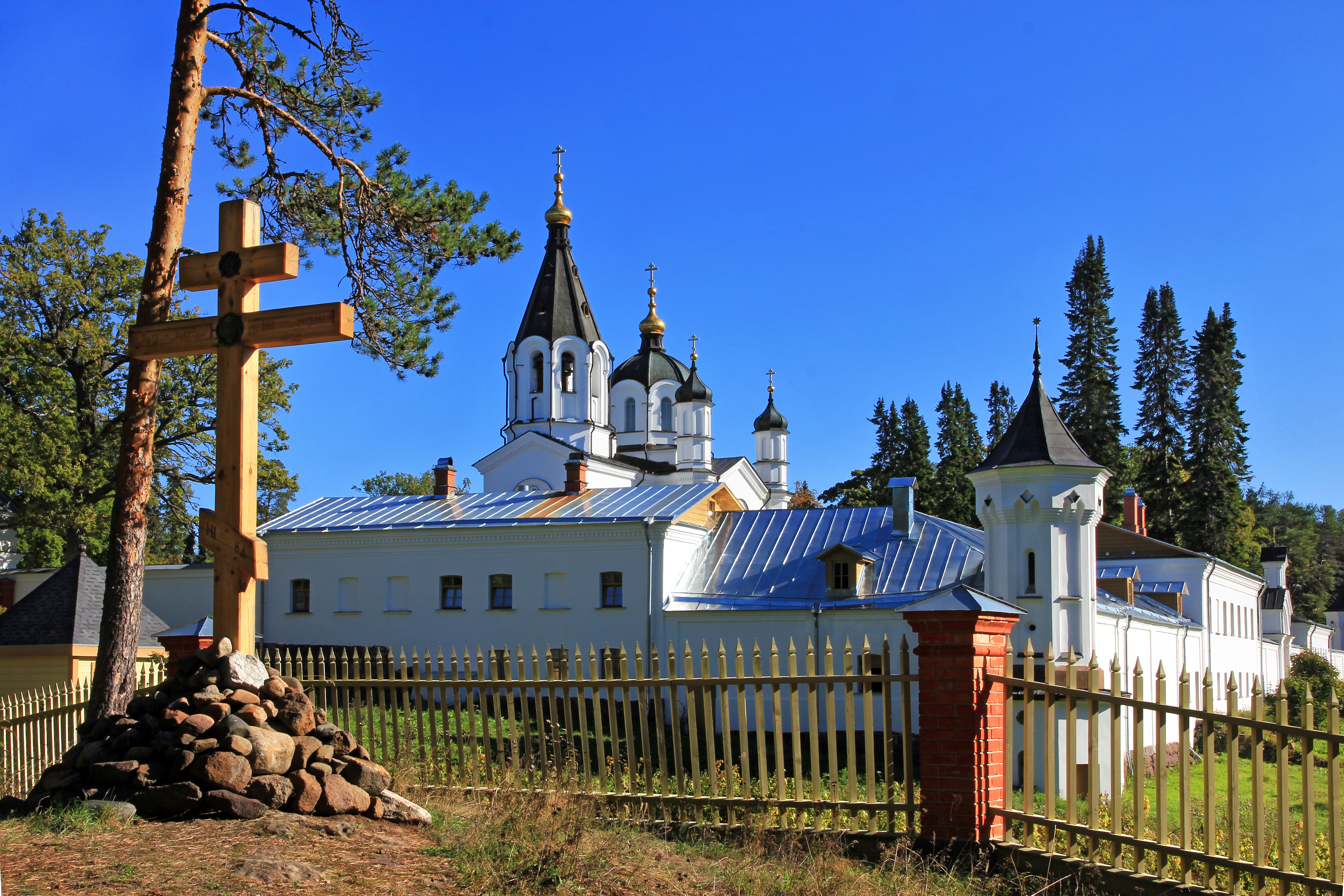
The Skete of All Saints on the Valaam island

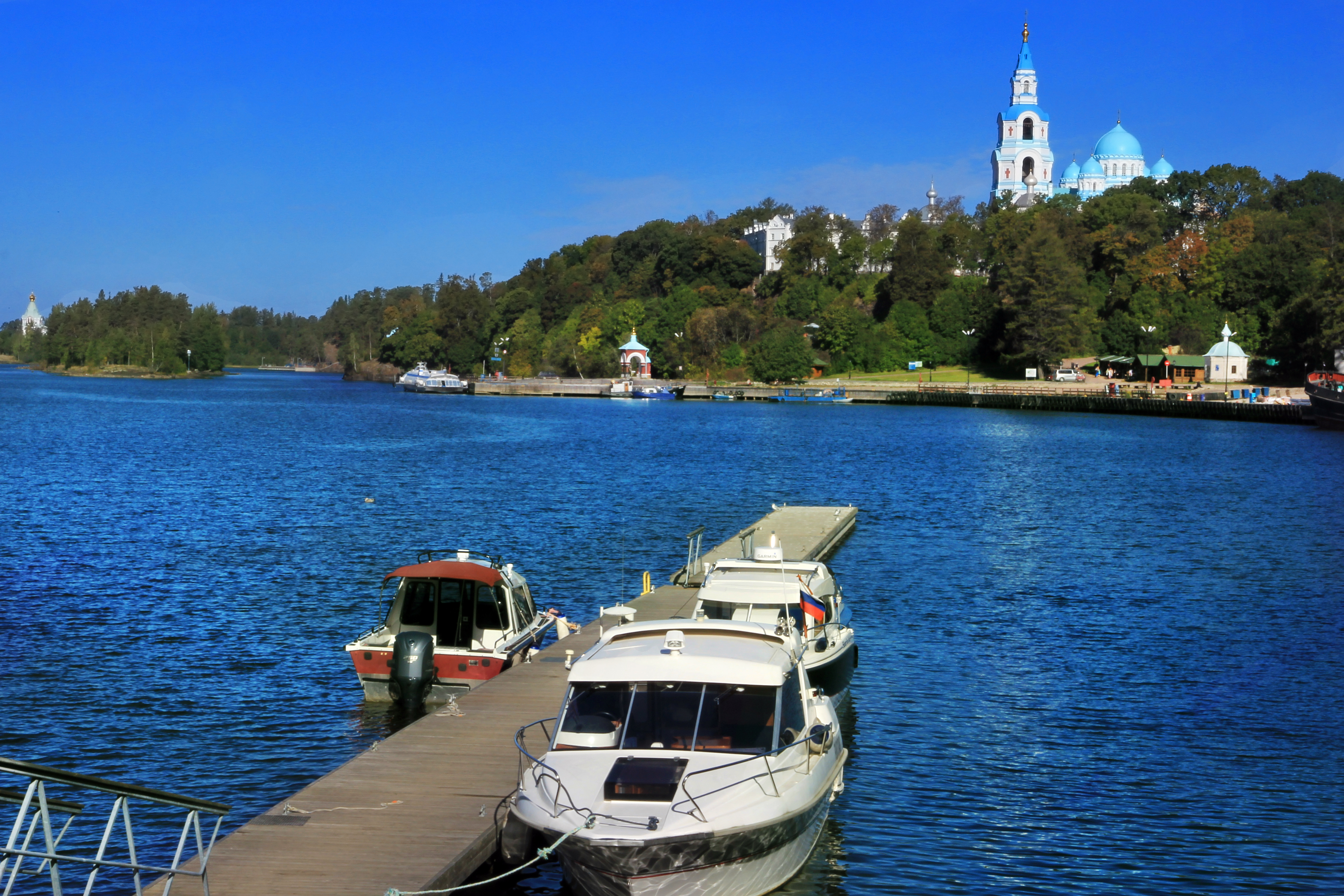
The archipelago in Ladoga Lake with the Monastery of the Transfiguration of the Saviour.

== Sources ==
- Selby, N. St. Petersburg, 2nd. edition, 1999, Lonely Planet Publications ISBN 0-86442-657-7
