= Aleksey Gornostayev =

Russian architect (1808–1862)

- Алексей Горностаев
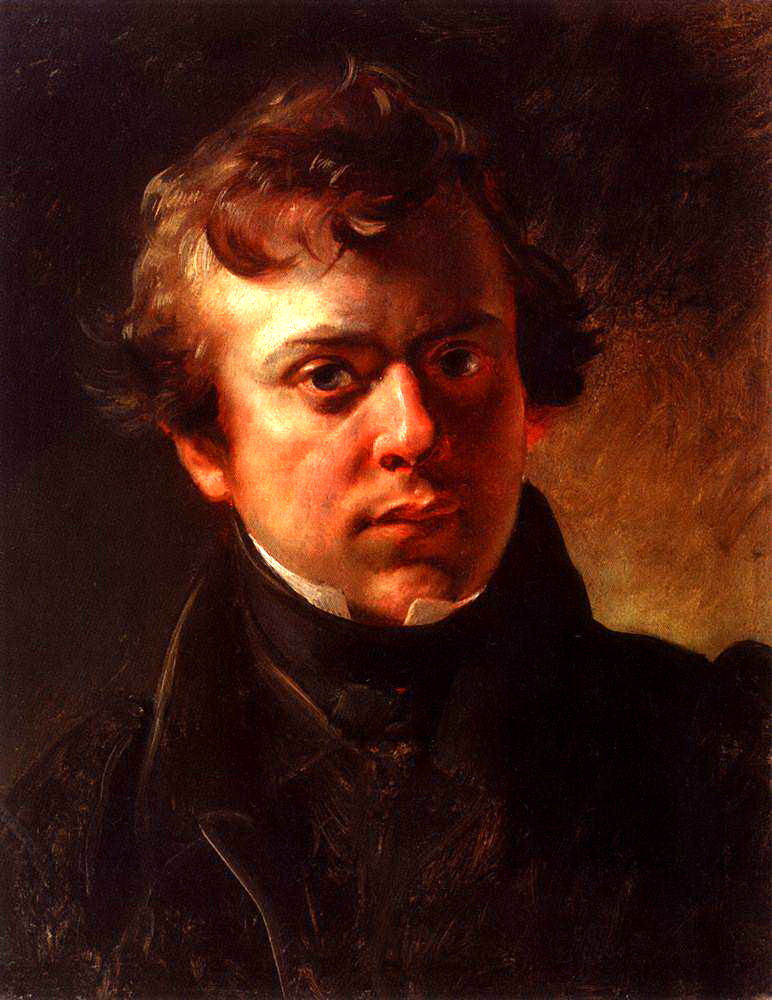
- Portrait by Karl Bryullov, 1834
- Born: February 18, 1808; Vyksa
- Died: December 18, 1862 (aged 54); Saint Petersburg
- Resting place: Coastal Monastery of Saint Sergius, St. Petersburg
- Education: Alexander Brullov
- Known for: Architecture
- Notable work: Valaam Monastery hermitages Uspenski Cathedral in Helsinki
- Elected: Member Academy of Arts (1838); Professor by rank (1849)

Alexey Maksimovich Gornostaev (Russian: Алексей Максимович Горностаев; February 18, 1808 – December 18, 1862) was a Russian architect, notable as a pioneer in Russian Revival, the builder of Valaam Monastery hermitages, Trinity-Sergius Convent in Saint Petersburg and Uspenski Cathedral in Helsinki. He is credited with the rebirth of traditional tented roof architecture of Russian North.

He should not be confused with two other Gornostaev architects (not related), also Russian Revival practitioners and preservationists:

- Ivan Ivanovich Gornostaev (1821–1874), chief architect of Saint Petersburg Public Library and University
- Fyodor Fyodorovich Gornostaev (1867–1915), notable for Rogozhskoye Cemetery belltower (1908–1913) and restoration of landmark buildings in Suzdal, Kursk and Moscow.

== Biography ==
(Note: This section is based on Gornostaev's biography in Brockhaus and Efron Encyclopedic Dictionary)

=== Education ===
Alexey Maksimovich Gornostaev was a son of foundry manager in Nizhny Novgorod region. He joined state service as a junior clerk in 1823 in his home town of Ardatov, relocated to Saint Petersburg in 1826, retired in 1827 and lived by drawing advertising boards and later illustrations for Svinyin publishing house. Svinyin financed his study tour of Russia; in 1829, Gornostaev applied into the class of Alessandro Brullo at the Imperial Academy of Arts and served as his apprentice on construction of Mikhailovsky Theater (1831). In 1834–1838, he travelled on his own account in Europe, earning highest credits for his artwork of Pompeii. He returned in 1838, the year when Nicholas I announced to the Academy that "To retain the spirit of ancient Byzantine architecture in church designs, architects should follow the drafts of Konstantin Thon" ("Государь император повелеть соизволил, дабы при составлении проектов церквей сохранить вкус древневизантийского зодчества, руководствоваться чертежами К. Тона"). Gornostaev received a state architect's license, Academy membership, and was employed as a Ministry of Interior architect since 1843 until his death. His practical career is clearly divided into two periods.

=== Neoclassical period (1838–1848) ===
Gornostaev's work prior to 1848 followed the tradition of this time, combining the declinining neoclassicism of Alexandrine era with the Pompeii taste of upper classes. One of his clients, M. V. Shishmaryov, would later finance Gornostaev's reconstruction of Trinity-Sergius Convent.

=== Russian Revival (1848–1862) ===
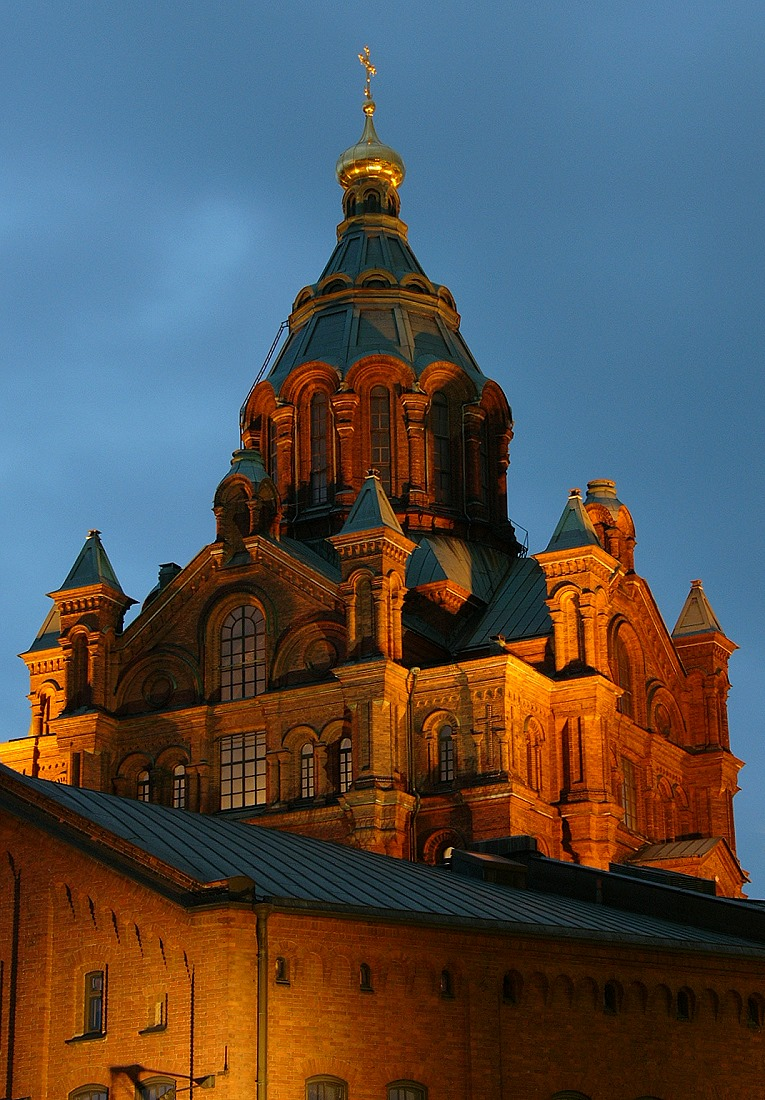
Uspenski Cathedral, Helsinki, at dusk

Gornostaev's life changed when he received an invitation from Damaskin (1795–1881, born Demyan Kononov), Hegumen of Valaam Monastery to rebuild the monastery and its numerous hermitages. As critic Vladimir Stasov put it, "He was already 45, a professor, well established among unanimous copying and mimicking of classical European, Greek and Roman styles, when suddenly, influenced by educated or independently-speaking clergy, took a sharp turn... Gornostaev despised official, fake Russian, Thon's style" ("Он уже был профессор, человек 45 лет, давно подвизавшийся на поприще всеобщего копирования и переобезьяничанья классических европейских стилей, греческих и римских, когда вдруг, под влиянием знакомства с образованным или самостоятельным нашим духовенством, круто поворотил на другую дорогу... Горностаеву был тошен официальный, лже-русский, тоновский стиль").

Instead of following Thon's Byzantine five-dome canon, Gornostaev chose to reincarnate the tented roofs of traditional northern Russia. At the same time, feeling limitations of this narrow approach, he augmented Russian tents with Romanesque vaults and arches. His input to Valaam reconstruction include:

- Vsekhsvyatsky (All Saints) hermitage, church and living quarters (Всехсвятский скит и церковь во имя всех святых, 1850 photo)
- Monastery Inn (Монастырская гостиница, 1851–1856)
- Mechanical Building (Машинный дом, 1860–1863) and water supply system
- Nikolsky (St.Nicholas) hermitage, church, memorial cross and living quarters (Никольский скит и церковь, 1853 photos)
- Predtechensky (St.John the Baptist hermitage, church and living quarters (Предтеченский скит и церковь Св. Иоанна Крестителя, 1858–1861, photo)
- Znamenskaya Chapel (Знаменская часовня, 1856)

The main Transfiguration Cathedral was built much later, in 1887, by Ivan Silin.

In 1858, Gornostaev designed Dormition Cathedral (photo) for the Sviatohirsk Lavra (now in the Donetsk Oblast of Ukraine), this time a traditional Byzantine tower. Shortly before his death, he designed and built improvements to Trinity-Sergius Convent in Strelna (near Saint Petersburg) – entrance gates, a chapel and two residential buildings. His last work, Orthodox Uspenski Cathedral in Helsinki, was completed after his death.
