= Valaam Monastery =

Orthodox monastery in Russia

- Валаамский монастырь
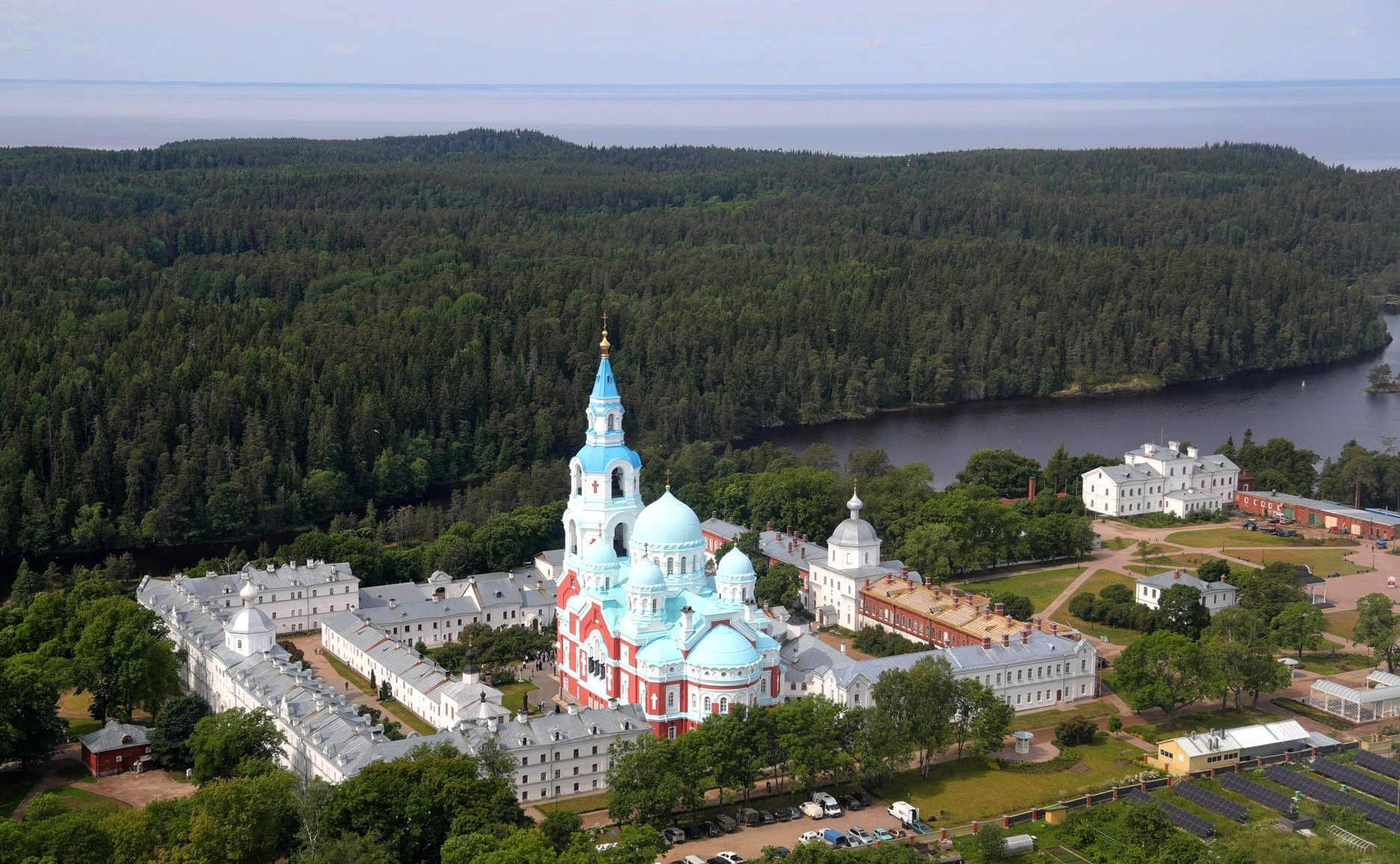
- Aerial view of Valaam Monastery (2017)

- Location within Russia
- Interactive map of Valaam Monastery

Monastery information
- Other name: Valamon luostari
- Denomination: Russian Orthodox
- Established: 1407
- Diocese: Stauropegion of the Russian Orthodox Church

People
- Founders: Sergius of Valaam, Herman of Valaam
- Abbot: Pancratius of Trinity

Architecture
- Heritage designation: Regional cultural heritage site
- Architect: Aleksey Gornostayev

Site
- Location: Valaam
- Coordinates: 61°23′20″N 30°56′43″E
- Website: https://valaam.ru/

The Valaam Monastery (Russian: Валаамский монастырь; Finnish: Valamon luostari) is a stauropegic Orthodox monastery in Russian Karelia, located on Valaam, the largest island in Lake Ladoga, the largest lake in Europe.

== History ==
It is not clear when the monastery was founded, as the cloister is not mentioned in documents before the 16th century. Dates from the 10th to the 15th centuries having been suggested. According to one tradition, the monastery was founded by a 10th-century Greek monk, Sergius of Valaam, and his Karelian companion, Herman of Valaam. Heikki Kirkinen dated the foundation of the monastery to the 12th century. Contemporary historians consider even this date too early. According to the scholarly consensus, the monastery was founded at some point towards the end of the 14th century. John H. Lind and Michael C. Paul date the founding to between 1389 and 1393 based on various sources, including the "Tale of the Valamo Monastery", a sixteenth-century manuscript discovered in 1989, which has the monastery founded during the archiepiscopate of Ioann II of Novgorod.

The monastery was a northern outpost of the Eastern Orthodox Church against pagans and, later, a western outpost against the Catholic Church from Tavastia, Savonia and Karelia Province. The power struggle between Russians and Swedes pushed the border eastwards in the 16th century; in 1578 the monastery was attacked and numerous monks and novices were killed by the Lutheran Swedes. The monastery was left desolate between 1611 and 1715 after another attack by the Swedes, with buildings being burned to the ground and the Karelian border between Russia and Sweden being drawn through Lake Ladoga. In the 18th century the monastery was magnificently restored, and in 1812 it came under the Russian Grand Duchy of Finland.

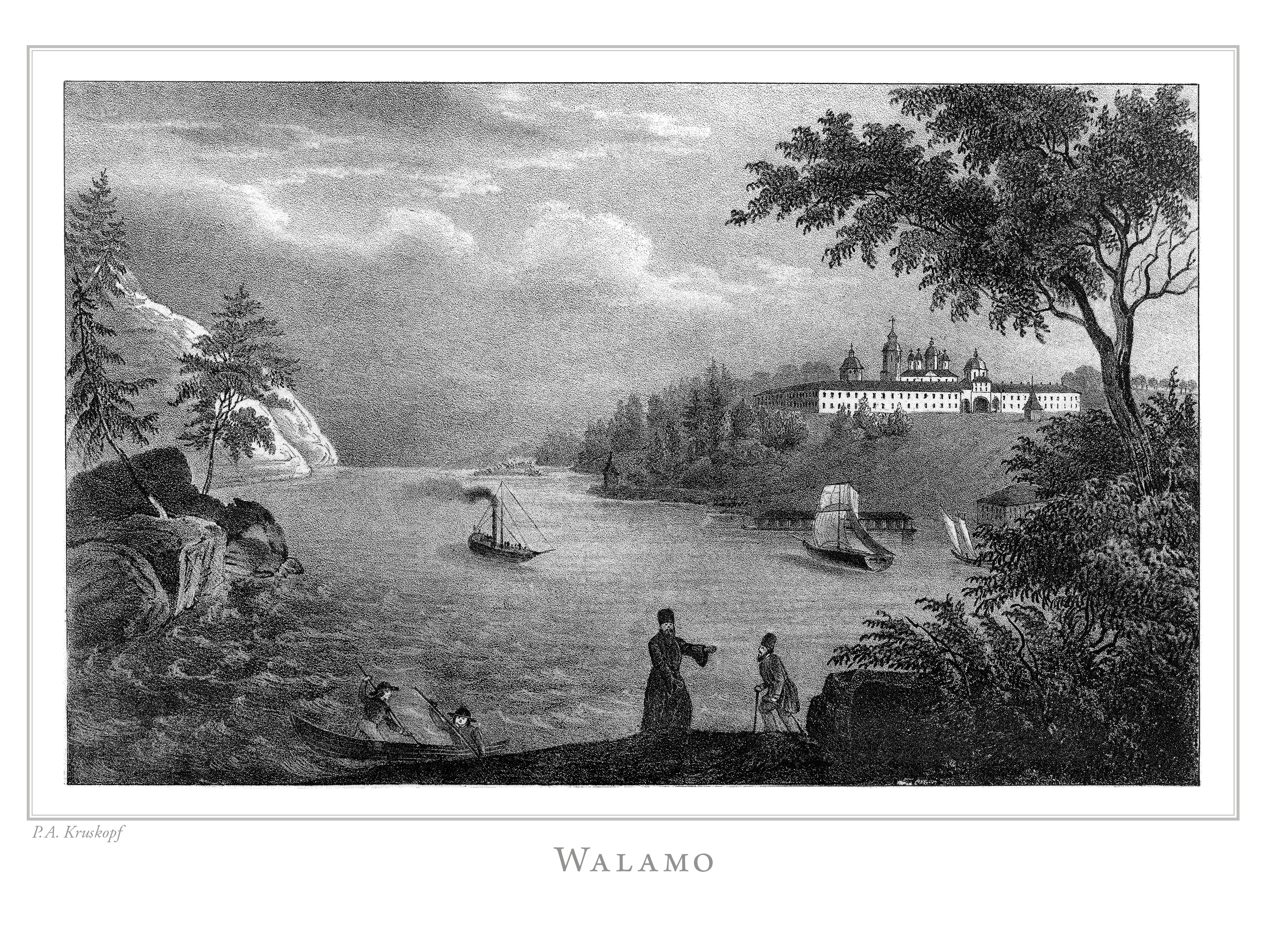
Illustration in Finland framstäldt i teckningar edited by Zacharias Topelius and published 1845–1852.

In 1917, Finland became independent, and the Finnish Orthodox Church became autonomous under the Ecumenical Patriarchate of Constantinople; previously, it had been a part of the Russian Orthodox Church. Valaam was the most important monastery of the Finnish Orthodox Church. The liturgic language was changed from Church Slavonic to Finnish and the liturgic calendar from the Julian to the Gregorian calendar. These changes led to bitter decades-long disputes in the monastic community of Valaam.

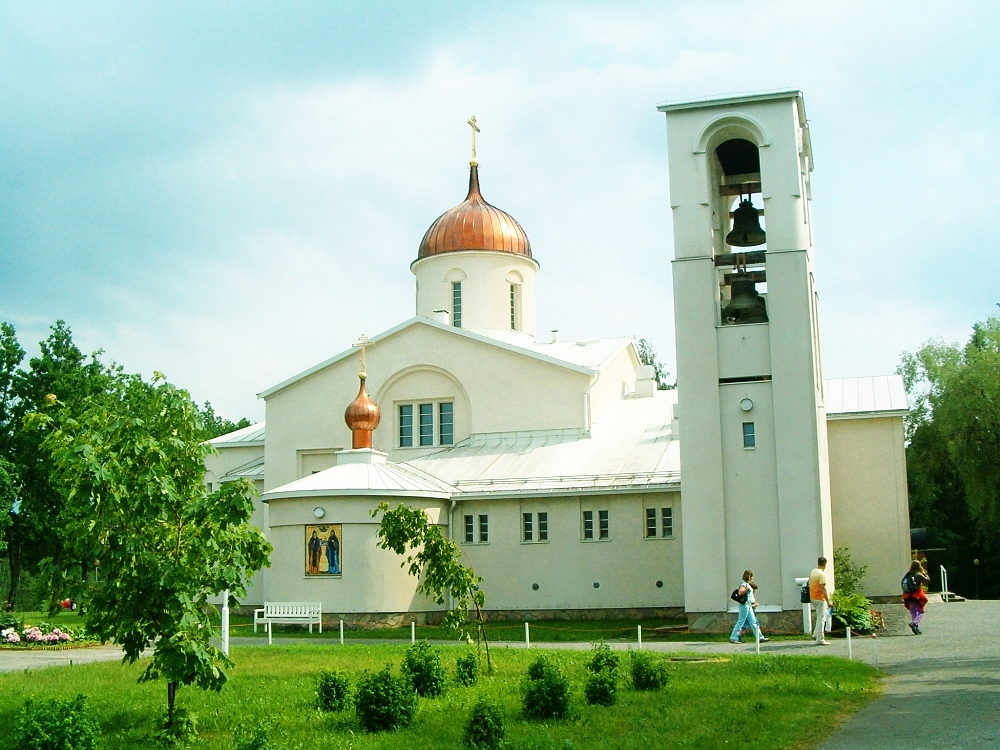
New Valamo monastery in Heinävesi, Finland.

The territory was fought over by the Soviet Union and Finland during World War II. Due to the Winter War, the monastery was evacuated in 1940, when 150 monks settled in Heinävesi in Finland. This community still exists as New Valamo Monastery in Heinävesi. Having received evacuees from the Konevsky Monastery and Pechenga Monastery, it is now the only monastery of the Finnish Orthodox Church, alongside the Lintula Holy Trinity Convent located just 14 km away. From 1941 to 1944, during the Continuation War, an attempt was made to restore the monastery buildings at Old Valaam, but later the island served as a Soviet military base.

After the original Valaam Monastery was returned to the Orthodox Church (in 1989), it enjoyed the patronage of Patriarch Alexy II of Moscow, who had frequently visited as a child. The monastery, whose buildings have been meticulously restored, has gained significant legal power over the island in a push to return to a state of spiritual seclusion. After years of legal disputes, many residents of the island chose to leave. The present Father Superior of the community is Bishop Pankraty (Zherdev) of Troitsk.

== Valaam chant ==
The monastery of Valaam has a unique tradition of singing, called the Valaam chant, that combines some features of Byzantine and Znamenny chants.

As in Byzantine chant, the singing is always in 2-parts, comprising a melody and an ison, but, as in Znamenny chant, the scale structure is always diatonic. The ornamentation is simplified in comparison with Byzantine chant, and the melodies are more similar to that of ancient Znamenny Chant, at the edge of being considered a local variety of this tradition. This relative simplicity became one of the reasons for the experimental introduction of Valaam chanting in various parishes across Russia by the end of 20th century.

The monastery has a professional five-strong male-voice choir which tours the world to raise money for the ongoing restoration of the buildings. Some of its music can be heard at the monastery's website.

== 2016 fire ==
On the morning of 1 May 2016, Pascha (Orthodox Easter Sunday), a blaze covering 800 square metres erupted on the monastery's property, inside the “Winter Hotel", a national heritage site constructed in the 1850s. Belonging to the Valaam monastery, the building is located immediately adjacent to the monastery's main cathedral. Emergency services reported no casualties from the incident.

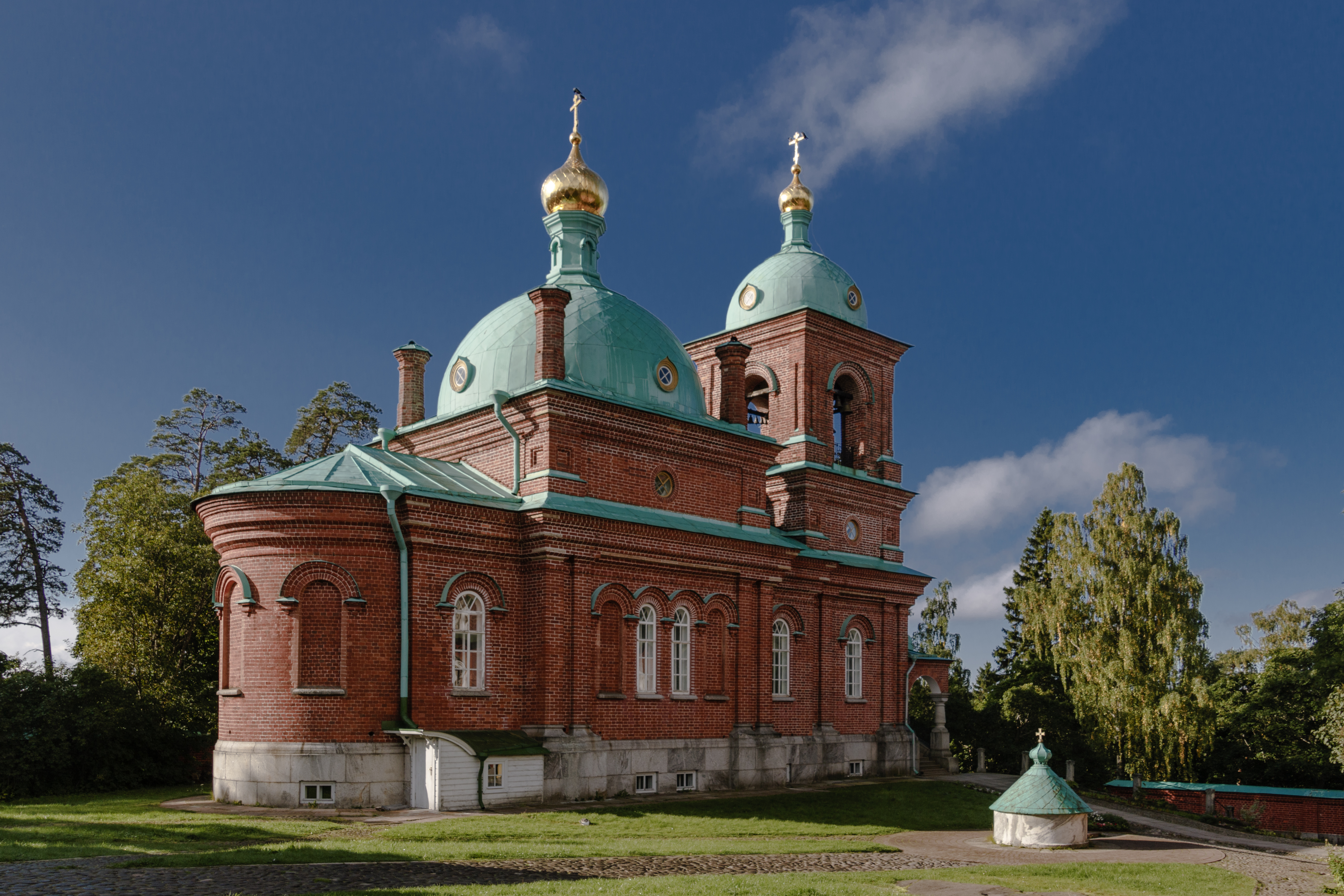
Voskresensky Skete

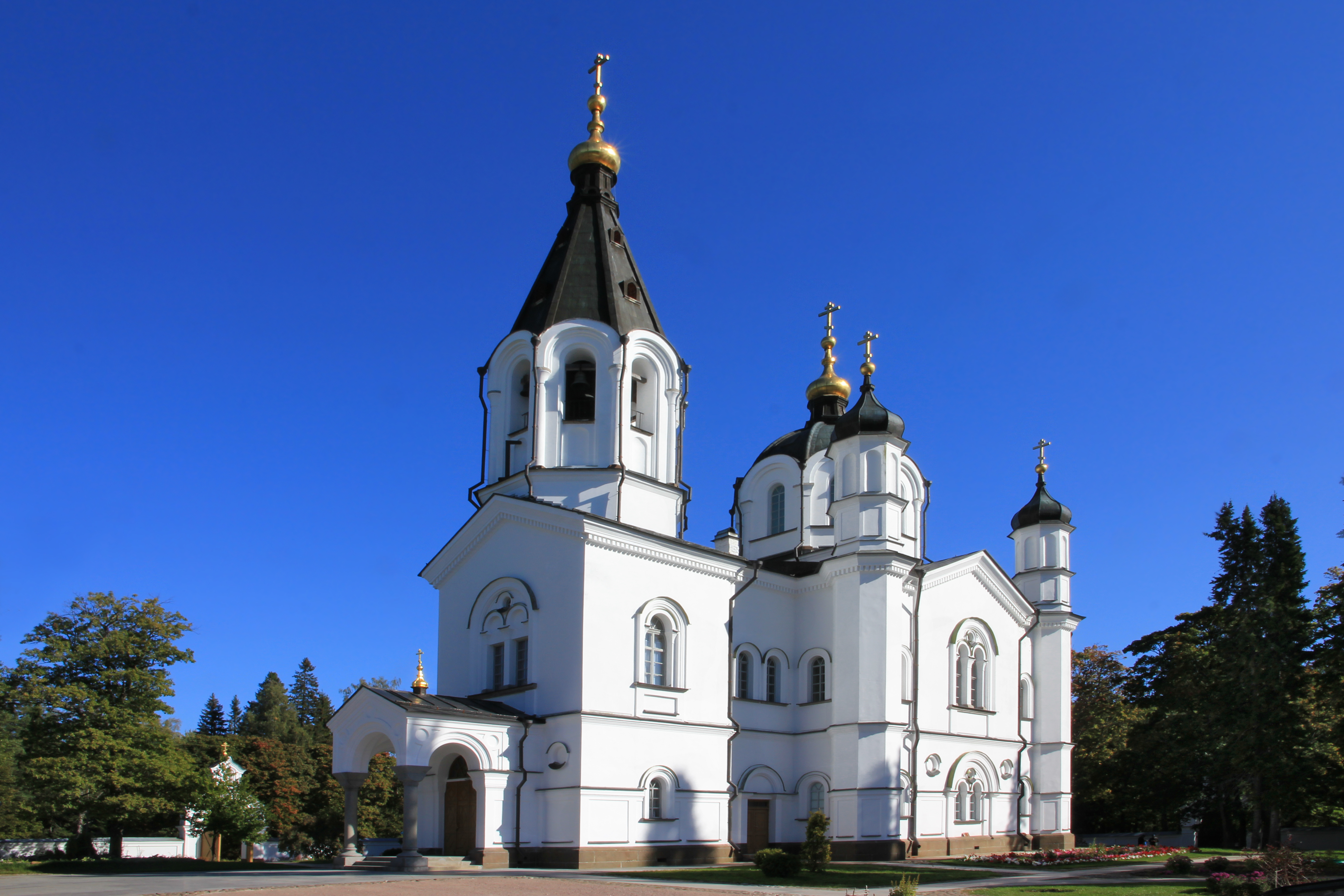
All Saints Skete

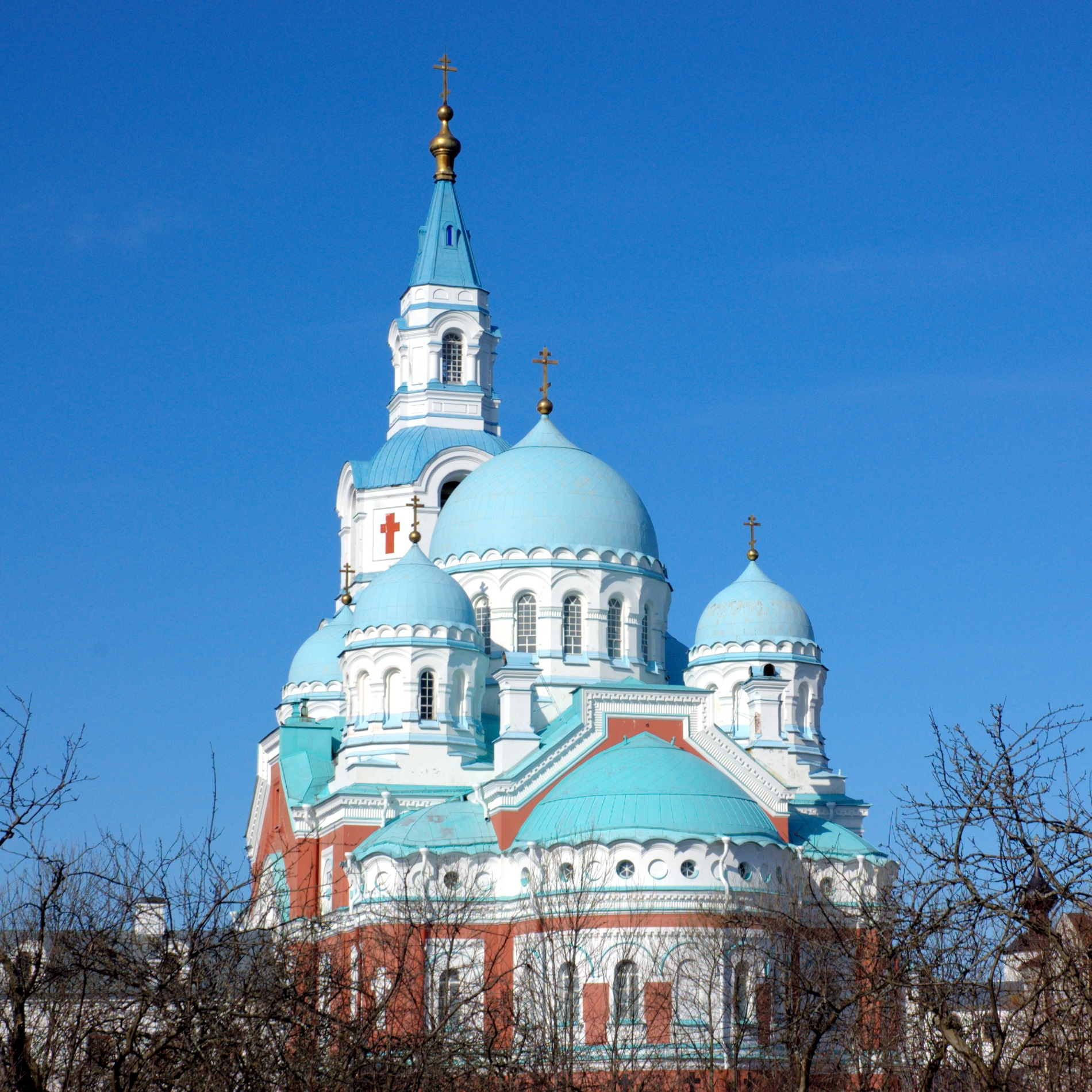
The katholikon

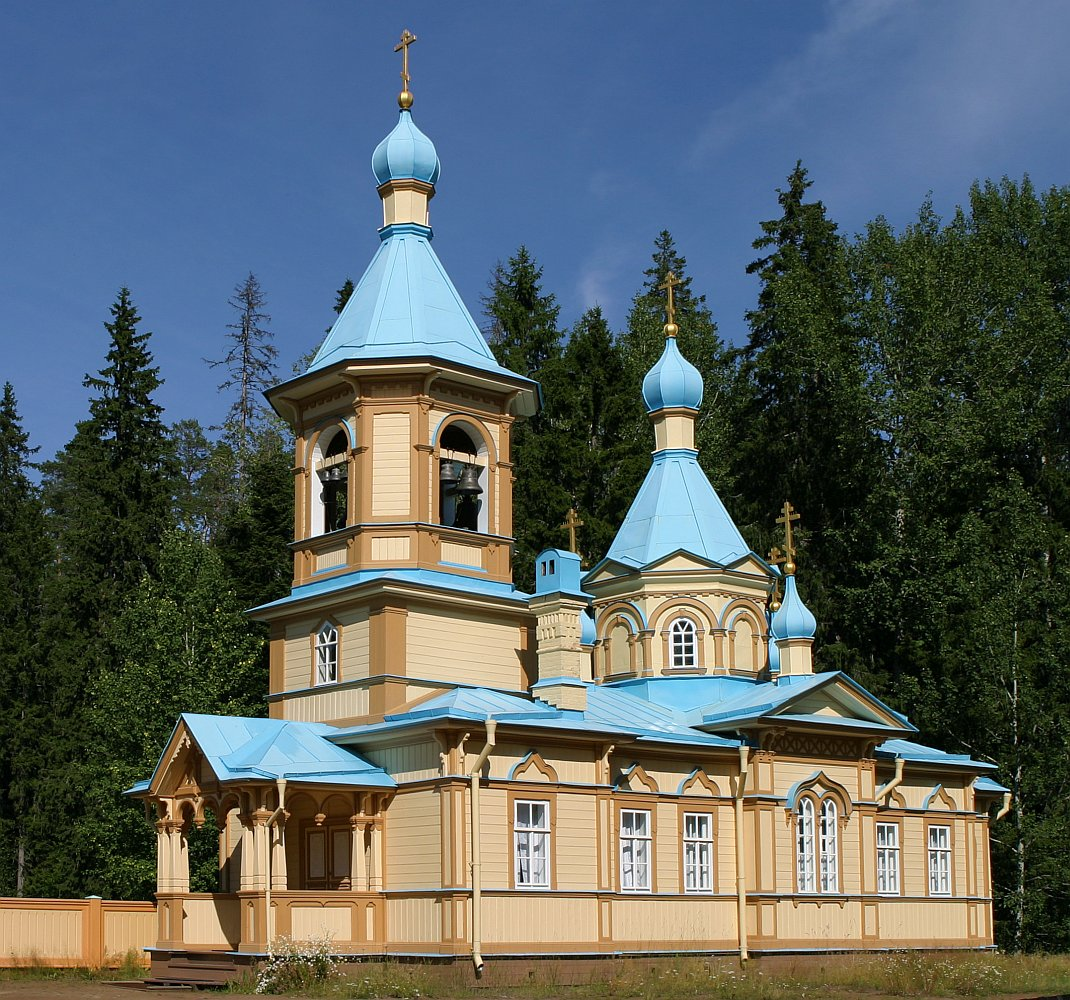
Gefsimanskiy Skete

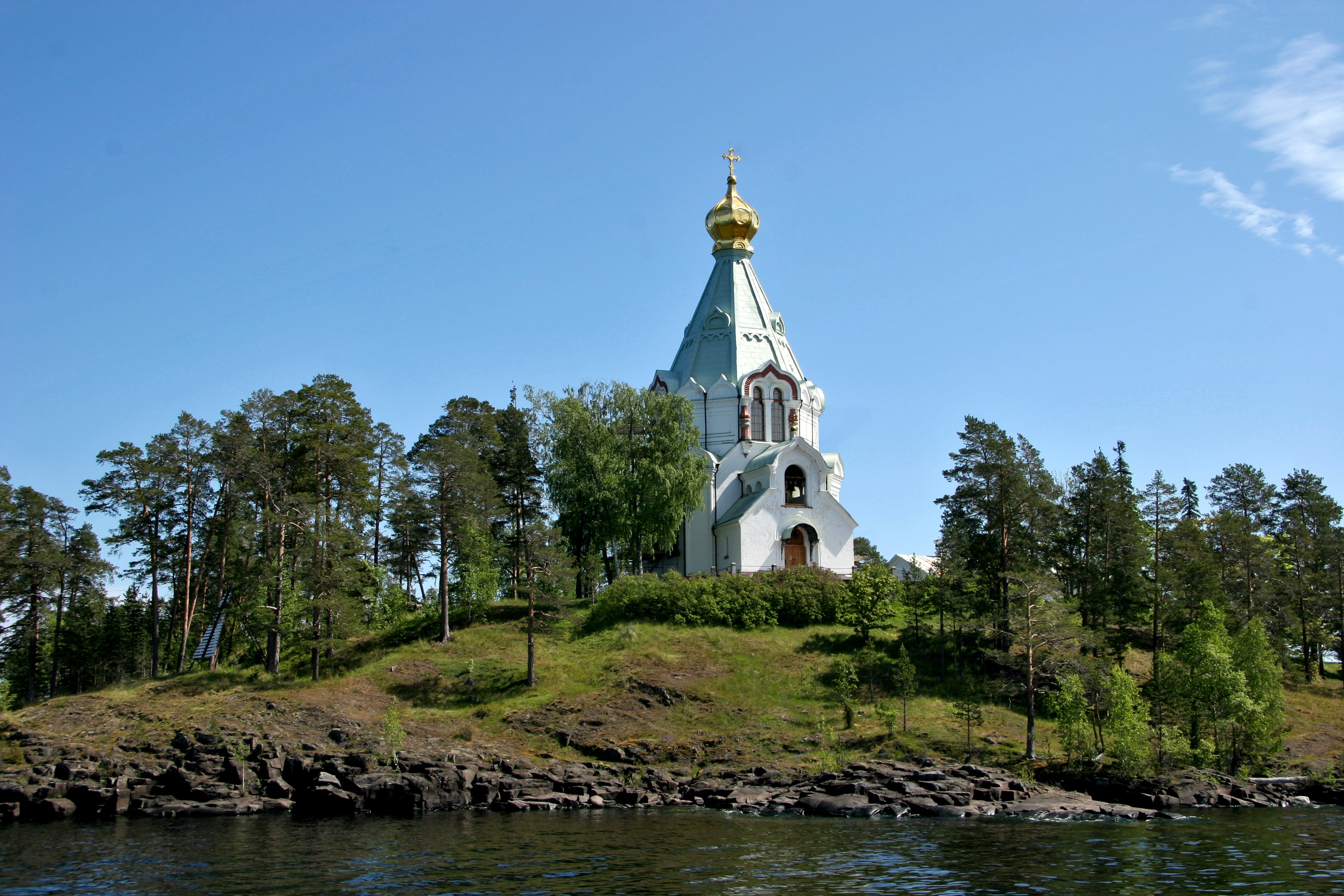
Nikolsky Skete

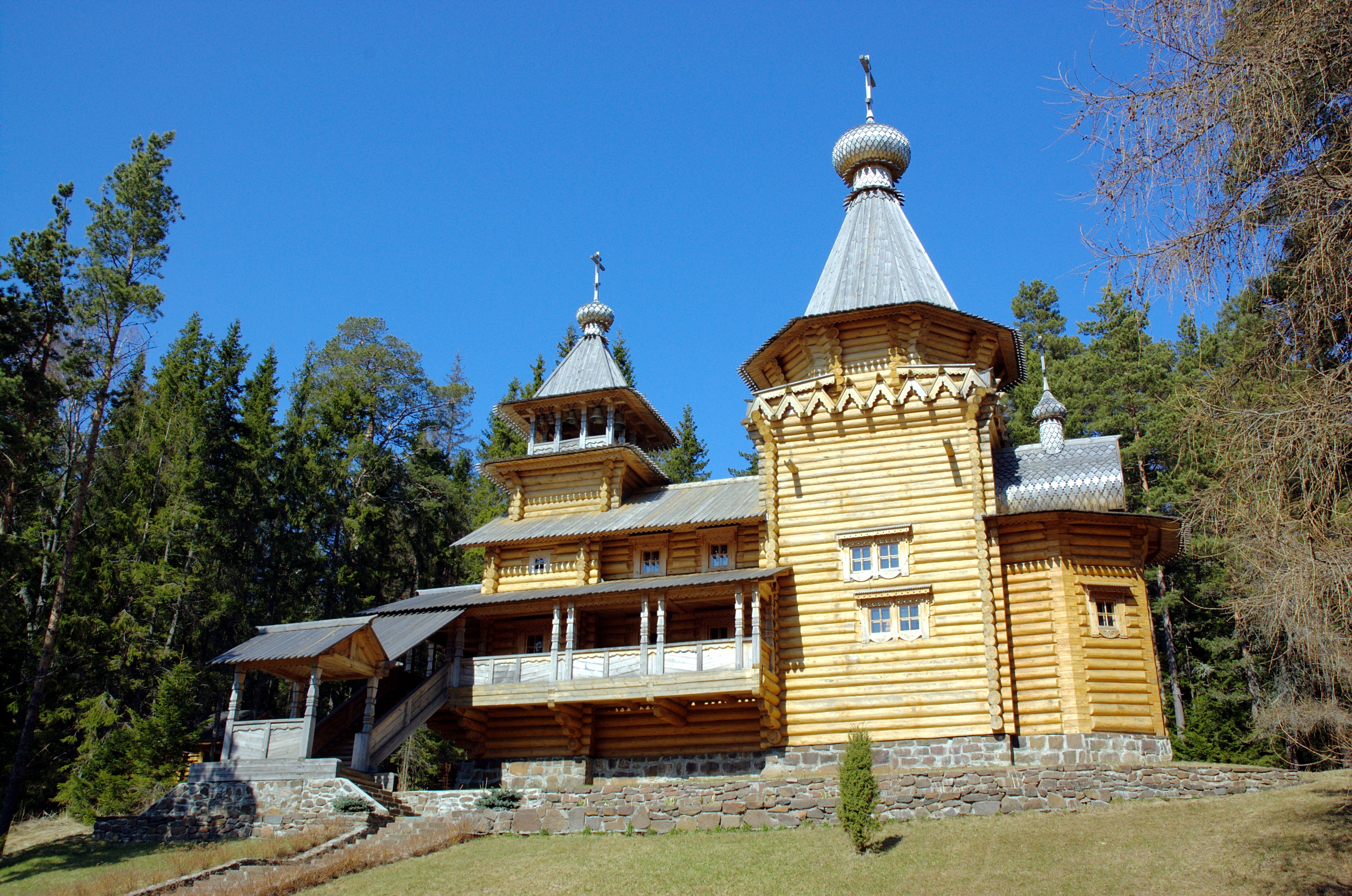
The rebuilt Saint Prophet Elias Skete on Lembos Island, ca. 10 km to the east of the main monastery

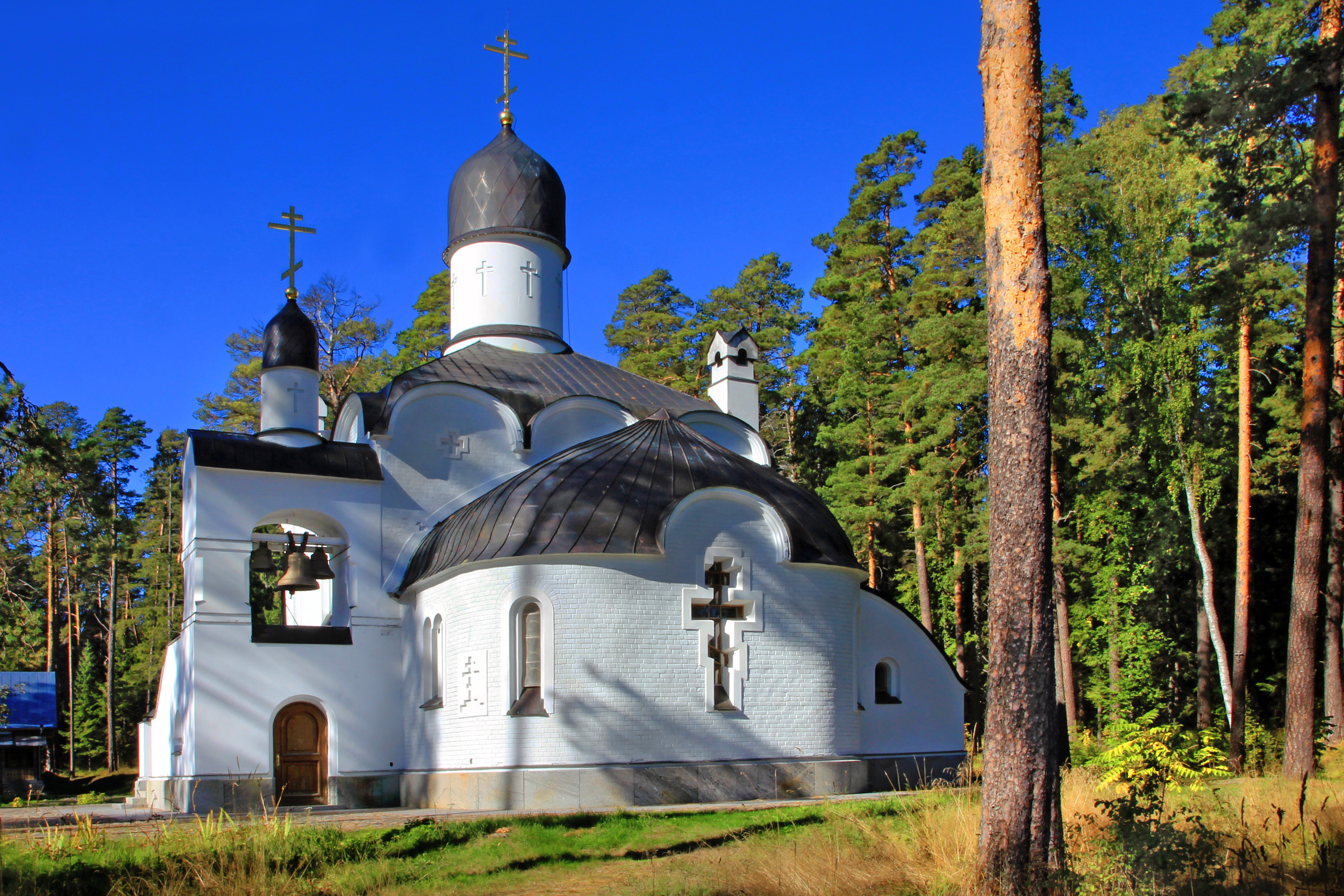
Smolensky Skete

Flag of the Valaam Monastery of Karelia, Russia

== See also ==
- Category:Burials at Valaam Monastery
- Skete
- Konevsky Monastery
