= Neverkinsky District =

Neverkinsky District Неверкинский район (Russian)
- District
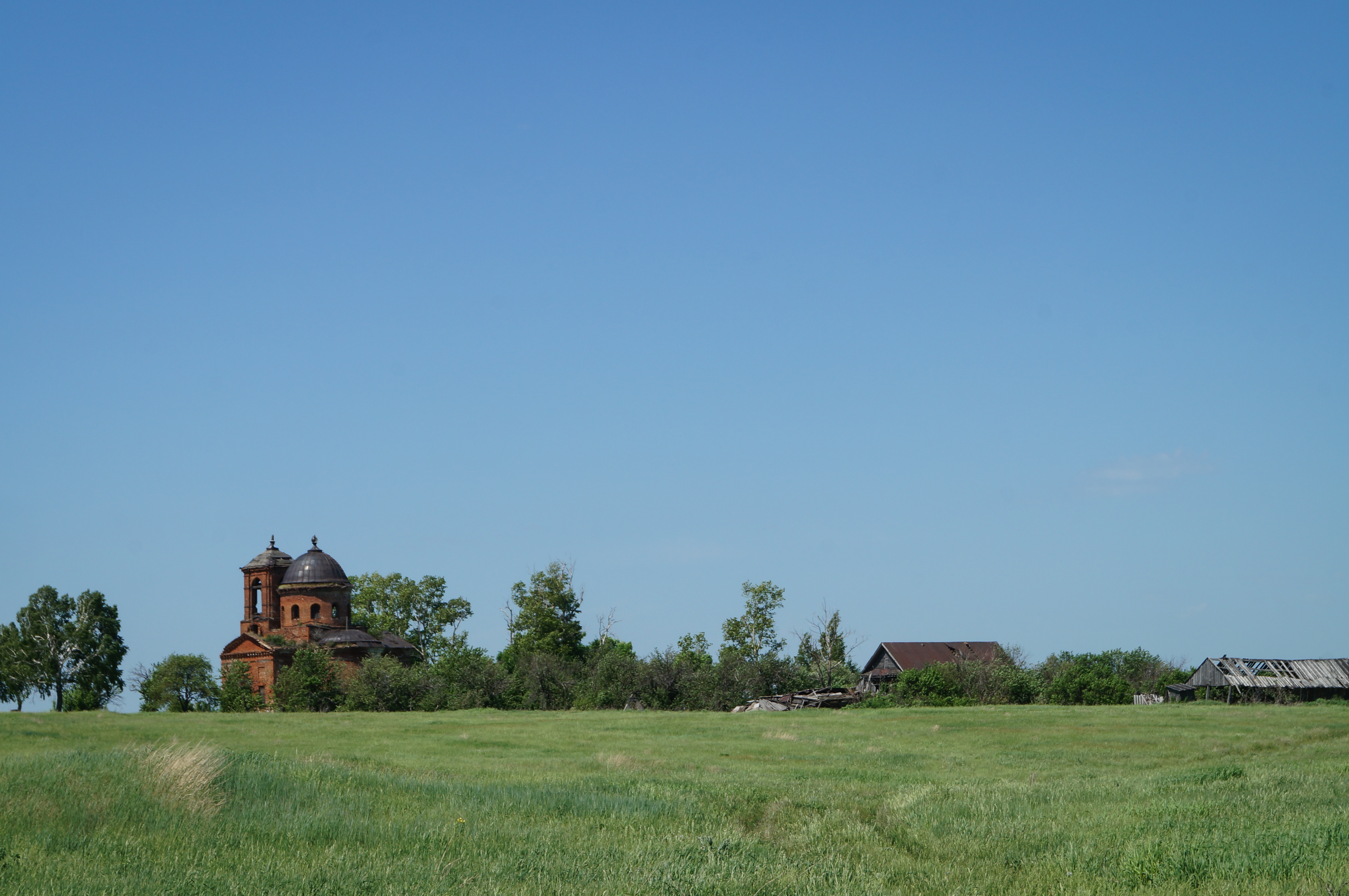
- Assumption Church, Neverkinsky District

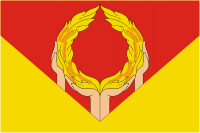
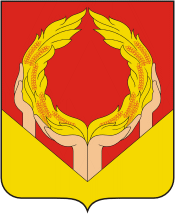
- Flag Coat of arms
- Location of Neverkinsky District in Penza Oblast
- Coordinates: 52°47′17″N 46°43′55″E
- Country: Russia
- Federal subject: Penza Oblast
- Administrative center: Neverkino

Area
  - Total: 984.5 km^{2} (380.1 sq mi)

Population (2010 Census)
  - Total: 16,329
  - Density: 16.59/km^{2} (42.96/sq mi)
  - Urban: 0%
  - Rural: 100%

Administrative structure
  - Administrative divisions: 15 selsoviet
  - Inhabited localities: 29 rural localities

Municipal structure
  - Municipally incorporated as: Neverkinsky Municipal District
  - Municipal divisions: 0 urban settlements, 15 rural settlements
- Time zone: UTC+3 (MSK)
- OKTMO ID: 56649000
- Website: http://rnever.pnzreg.ru/

Neverkinsky District (Russian: Неве́ркинский райо́н; Tatar: Невер районы, romanized: Never rayonı) is an administrative and municipal district (raion), one of the twenty-seven in Penza Oblast, Russia. It is located in the southeast of the oblast. The area of the district is 984.5 square kilometers (380.1 sq mi). Its administrative center is the rural locality (a selo) of Neverkino. Population: 16,329 (2010 Census); 18,538 (2002 census); 19,247 (1989 Soviet census). The population of Neverkino accounts for 26.8% of the district's total population.

== Geography ==
The highest point of Penza Oblast is an unnamed hill of the Khvalynsk Mountains reaching 342 metres (1,122 ft) above sea level is located in the district.
