= Irgiz =

Irgiz may refer to:

- Bolshoy Irgiz, a river in Russia
- Maly Irgiz, a river in Russia
- Irgiz (Turgay), a river in Kazakhstan, tributary of the Turgay
- Yrgyz, a town in Kazakhstan
