= Khvalynsky District =

Khvalynsky District Хвалынский район (Russian)
- District
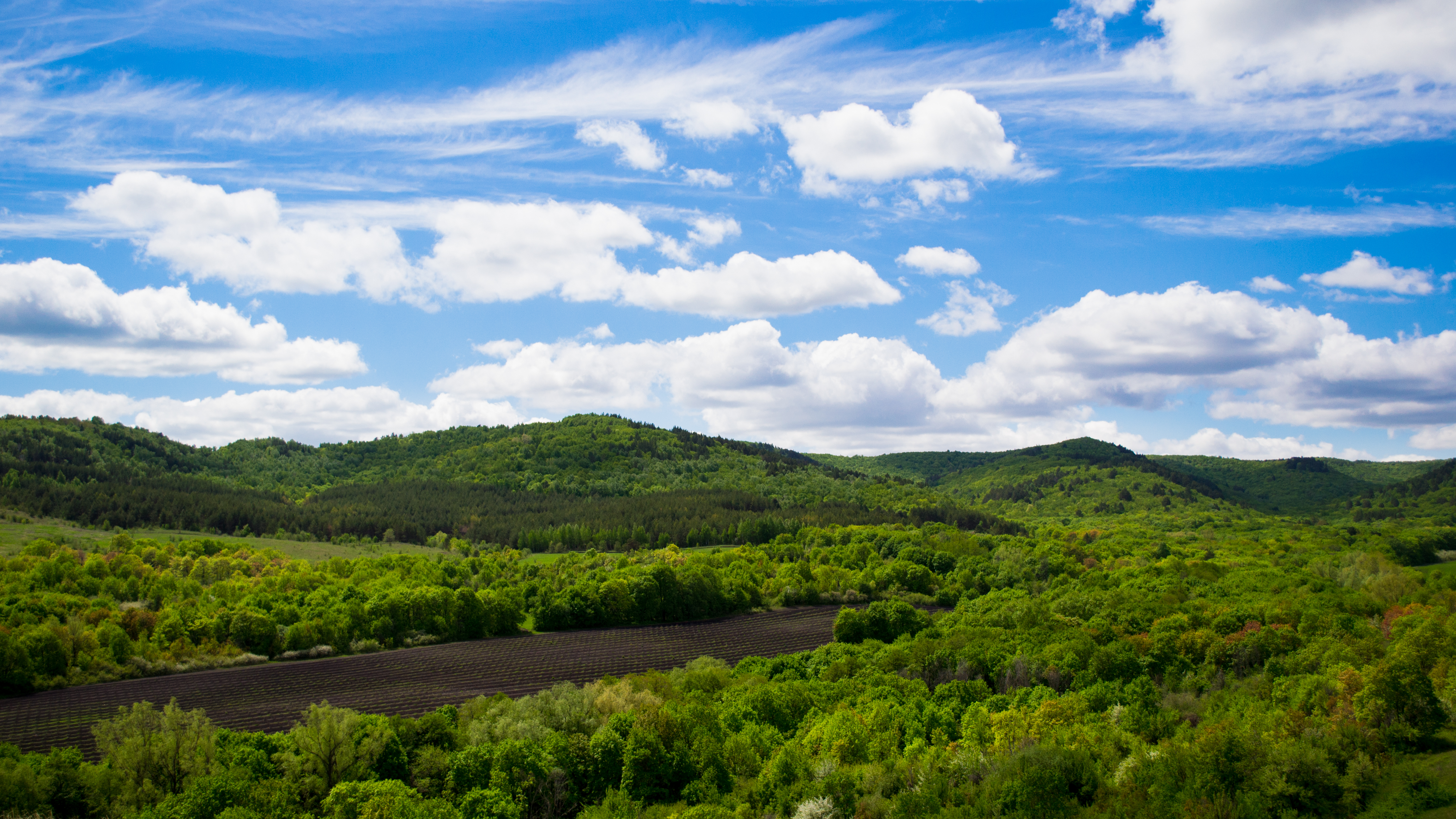
- Hills in Khvalynsky National Park, Khvalynsky District

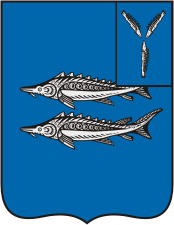
- Coat of arms
- Location of Khvalynsky District in Saratov Oblast
- Coordinates: 52°29′N 48°06′E
- Country: Russia
- Federal subject: Saratov Oblast
- Administrative center: Khvalynsk

Area
  - Total: 1,900 km^{2} (730 sq mi)

Population (2010 Census)
  - Total: 10,688
  - Density: 5.6/km^{2} (15/sq mi)
  - Urban: 0%
  - Rural: 100%

Administrative structure
  - Inhabited localities: 28 rural localities

Municipal structure
  - Municipally incorporated as: Khvalynsky Municipal District
  - Municipal divisions: 1 urban settlements, 7 rural settlements
- Time zone: UTC+4 (MSK+1)
- OKTMO ID: 63649000
- Website: http://hvalynsk.sarmo.ru/

Khvalynsky District (Russian: Хвалынский райо́н) is an administrative and municipal district (raion), one of the thirty-eight in Saratov Oblast, Russia. It is located in the north of the oblast. The area of the district is 1,900 square kilometers (730 sq mi). Its administrative center is the town of Khvalynsk (which is not administratively a part of the district). Population: 10,688 (2010 Census); 12,962 (2002 census); 15,297 (1989 Soviet census).

== Administrative and municipal status ==
Within the framework of administrative divisions, Khvalynsky District is one of the thirty-eight in the oblast. The town of Khvalynsk serves as its administrative center, despite being incorporated separately as a town under oblast jurisdiction—an administrative unit with the status equal to that of the districts (and which, in addition to Khvalynsk, also includes six rural localities).

As a municipal division, the district is incorporated as Khvalynsky Municipal District, with Khvalynsk Town Under Oblast Jurisdiction being incorporated within it as Khvalynsk Urban Settlement.
