= Khvalisy =

The Khvalisy were a tribe mentioned in old Russian chronicles by Nestor.

Polish historian August Bielowski conjectured that Khvalisy referred to the same people called "Khalyzians" by the Byzantine chroniclers.

Other scholars believe that "Khvalisy" refers to Khazaran, the twin city of Atil, (the capital of the Khazar Khaganate) and that the term derives from the Khwarazmians who formed a part of the Khazar army (see Arsiyah).

== See also ==
- Khvalynsk - a Russian town whose name may derive from the same root
