= Khvalynsky National Park =

National park in Saratov Oblast, Russia

- Хвалынский (Russian)
- IUCN category II (national park)
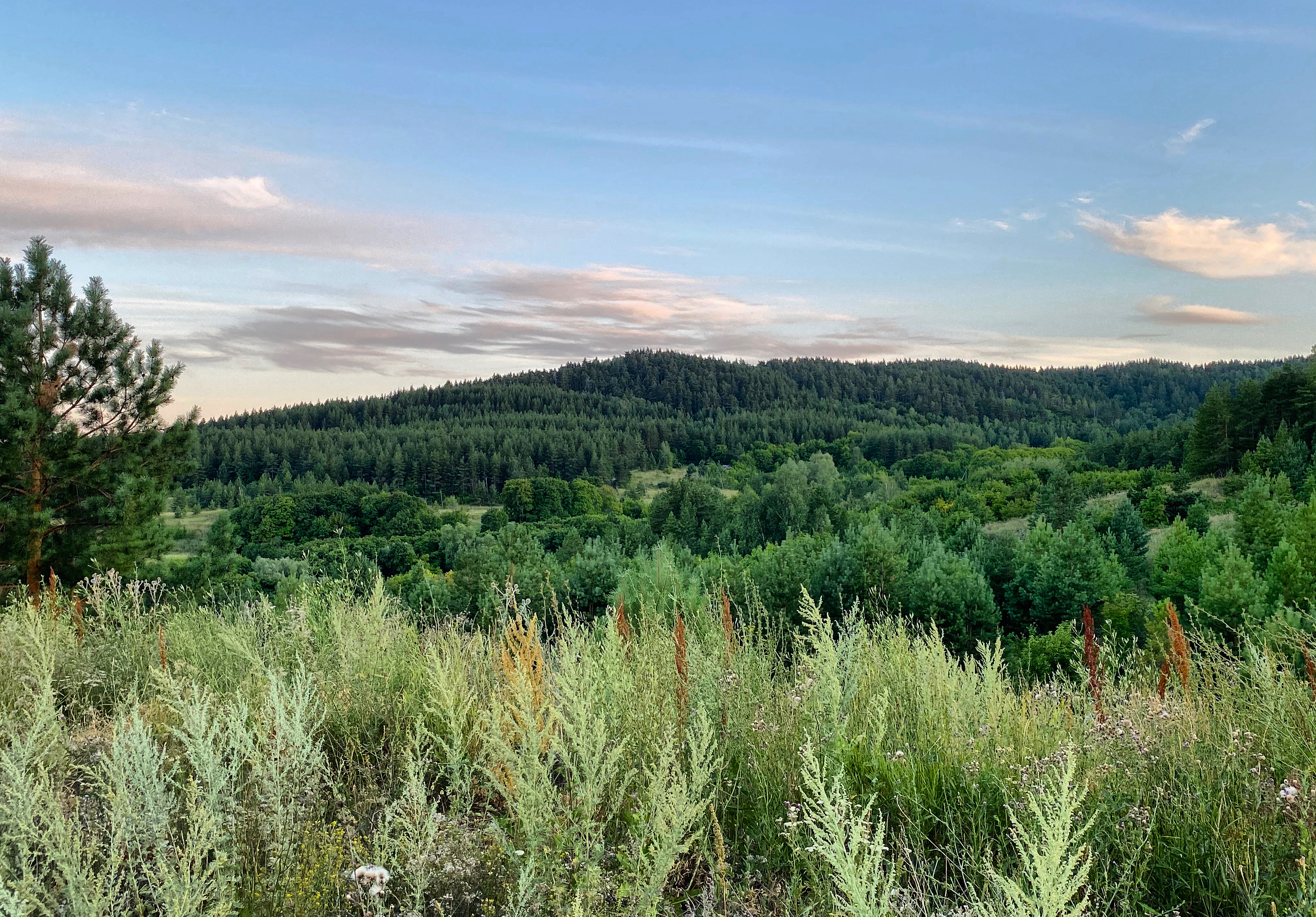
- Khvalynsky NP

- Location within Russia
- Location: Saratov Oblast
- Nearest city: Khvalynsk
- Coordinates: 52°29′N 48°06′E
- Area: 25,524 hectares (63,071 acres; 255 km^{2}; 99 sq mi)
- Visitors: 35,000

Khvalynsky National Park (Russian: Хвалынский) encompasses a raised plateau of chalk hills of the Volga Uplands, covered in mixed oak-linden and conifer forests, along the west side of the Volga River. It is about 1,000 km north of the Caspian Sea, in Saratov Oblast overlooking the Saratov Reservoir. The northern end is about 10 km west of the city of Khvalynsk, and about 200 km northeast of Saratov on the Volga. About 25,524 hectares (63,071 acres; 255 km^{2}; 99 sq mi) in size, Khvalynsky is spread over three sections. The park was officially formed in 1994.

== Topography ==
The park centers on the Khvalynsk Mountains, a raised plateau that stretches along the west bank of the Volga River (referred to as the 'Right Bank'). Because the bedrock is primarily chalk and marl, the landform reflects extensive erosion out from the center of the ridge, with undulating and hilly terrain and numerous interconnected ravines and gullies. The varied landforms create many micro-climates and habitats. The highest mountain (Belenkaya, almost entirely of chalk) is 369 meters in altitude, and there are five other mountains over 250 meters in height. The mountains in the park are mostly covered with upland forest trees. The Volga reaches its greatest depths (22 meters) in the territory of the park.

Over 90% of the park is forest land. There are numerous outcrops of exposed bedrock, and underground water that frequently comes to the surface in springs. Habitats include pine and watershed forests, small rivers and hollows, and various types of forest edge and steppe.

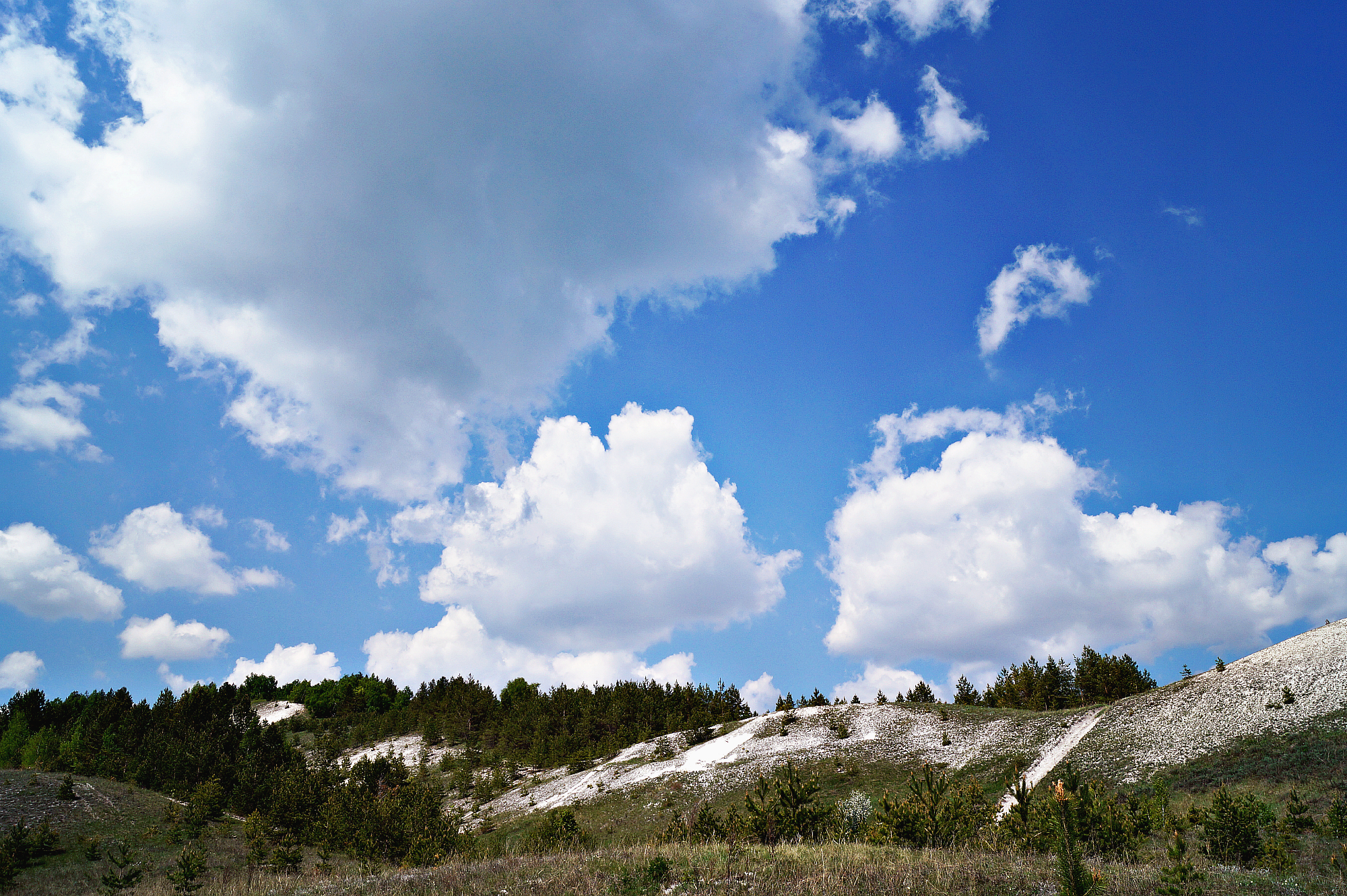
Chalk hills in Khvalysky National Park

== Ecoregion and climate ==
Khvalysky is in the Pontic–Caspian steppe ecoregion, a band of grasslands and occasional forest that stretches from the middle of Ukraine to the Ural Mountains. The climate of Kvalynsky is Humid continental climate, warm summer (Köppen climate classification (Dfb)). This climate is characterized by large swings in temperature, both diurnally and seasonally, with mild summers and cold, snowy winters. Winters last from late November to early April, with an average of 33 cm of snow.

== Animals ==
Because Khvalynsky borders many ecological zones - forest, semi-arid steppe, the Volga, mountain, meadows, and stream valleys - it has a complex variety of habitats. These varied habitats supports a large number of different plants and animals, many of which are rare or endangered. Small mammals are common, including hares, beavers, foxes, and wolves. Among reptiles are the common European adder (vipera berus), an indicator of complex habitat.

Predatory birds include White-tailed Eagles, Ospreys, and the endangered Saker Falcon.

== Plants ==
The forest-forming trees are predominantly oak (40%), linden (30%) and pine (21%), with many lesser species, including remnants of orchards on some of the edge slopes. Over 970 different vascular plants have been identified in the park, 26 of which are rare or endangered (there is a list on the official website of the park.

== Tourism ==
Public use is encouraged, with the park generally zoned into protected, recreational, and commercial. Environmental paths are laid out to visit some of the highlights, including the "Puteshestvie po Dnu Drevnego Morya" (Travel on the Bottom of an Ancient Sea) which highlights the geology of the area. Another path leads to the Peshchera Monakha (Monk's Cave). There is a museum of everyday peasant life, "Derevenskoe Podvorye” (“Village Farmstead”), a chapel and sacred springs. Cars are not permitted in the protected zone. Accommodations in a family-oriented guesthouse are available by prior reservation, or in the nearby town of Khvalynsk. About 30-35 thousand people visit the park every year.

Representative animals of the park can be seen in a captive farm (zoo) in the park, and by prior arrangement visitors can experience a "Khvalinskoe safari" in the park itself. There is a ski resort on the edge of the park, and resort hotels. In the town of Khalynsk to the northeast of the park is a local history museum. Khvalysky is a 'Sister Park' with Fossil Butte National Monument, a unit of the National Park Service in the United States.
