= Khalyzians =

The Khalyzians or Chalyzians (Arabic: Khalis, Khwarezmian: Khwalis, Byzantine Greek: Χαλίσιοι, Khalisioi, Magyar: Kálizok, also known in German sources as Kolzen, Koltzil, Kotziler and Cozlones) were the Bessi "Black-Cuman" people of the Carpathian Basin mentioned from 680s to the 1240s in various Medieval sources such as the 12th-century Byzantine historian John Kinnamos. Their name derived from the Khwarezm region of Central Asia.

Kinnamos in his epitome twice mentions Khalisioi in the Hungarian army. He first describes them as practising Mosaic law; though the consensus is that they were Muslims. They were said to have fought against the Byzantine Empire as allies of the tribes of Dalmatia in 1154, during Manuel Comnenus's campaign in the Balkans.

Prior to the years 889–92 some Khalis and Kabars (Kavars) of the Khazar realm had joined the Hungarian (Magyar) federation that had conquered and settled in Hungary. Another group had joined the Pechenegs. Al-Bakri (1014–1094) states that around 1068 A.D. there were considerable numbers of al-Khalis amongst the nomadic Muslim Pechenegs (Hungarian: Besenyő), that lived around the southern steppes of Russia.

He also mentions that the original al-Khalis living within the Khazar realm may have been foreign slaves from Byzantine Constantinople and/or other lands. The Pechenegs gave them the choice of staying in their country, where they could inter-marry or leave for another country of their choice. Anna Komnena in her Alexiad mentions a Pecheneg chief named Khalis.

Abraham Harkavy hypothesized that the Khalyzians were refugees fleeing the destruction of their khaganate by the Kievan Rus in the 960s AD and the Pecheneg influx which followed in the 970s. A contemporary of Harkavy's, the Polish historian August Bielowski, suggested that the Khalyzians were identical with the tribe known in Russian sources as the Khvalisy; hence they may have been connected to the Arsiya.

The maternal ancestors of the Magyarized Pecheneg clan Aba, to which the Hungarian king Samuel Aba (1041–47) belonged, were according to Hungarian chronicles of Khwarazmian origin (de gente Corosmina, de Corosminis orta).

== The Khwarezmian connection ==
Khwarezm is a city in present-day Uzbekistan, in the former Persian province of Khorasan. Since it was part of the Silk Road, it was known internationally, and had several different names in several different languages, including Byzantine Greek who called the products of this city "khalisios", which was masculine for "of the city of Khalis."

== A province of the Lower Volga ==
The province of Khwalis (Khwali-As) on the lower Volga, was the realm of the trading Eastern Iranians; its twin city Amol/Atil, also called Sariycin/Khamlikh. It was ruled by a governor with the title of Tarkhan As-Tarkhan.

Source: Harvard Ukrainian Studies, Volume II, Number 3, September 1978, p. 262 (Ukrainian Research Institute, Harvard University Cambridge, Massachusetts).

== Areas named after the Kaliz ==
Budakalász (Hungary), Körös (Hungary), Kalász (Hungary/Slovakia), Cuzdrioara (Transylvania, Romania), Halych (Ukraine), Kalasë (Albania), Kalasevo (Mordovia) and numerous other places in Russia, Kalash Garan (Ostan-e Lorestan, Iran), Kalizeh (Velayat-e Helmand, Afghanistan) and Kalis/Kalas (Punjab Pakistan).

== See also ==
- Böszörmény
- Kankalis a clan of Pechenegs (Besenyő)
- Kabar
- Qarays and Karaim language

== Sources ==
- 1901-1906 Jewish Encyclopedia
