= Ahmad ibn Kuya =

10th-century Khazar vizier

Ahmad ibn Kuya (also ibn Kuia, Ahmad son of Kuya or Kuwya; Arabic: أحمد بن كويه) was a vizier of the Khazar Khaganate and the commander of the Arsiyah (al-Larisiya) guard during the 940s.

== Biography ==
According to the Arab historian Al-Masudi, who provided the most detailed description of the Muslim community in Khazaria (c. 943), the royal guard consisted of Muslims and had a commander chosen from among their own ranks. This commander held the position of vizier and possessed the right of supreme judicial jurisdiction over all Muslims in the capital, Atil.

It is probable that Ibn Fadlan, writing two decades earlier (c. 922), mentions this same official role. He describes an attendant of the king, designated by the word khaz.

== Kiev hypothesis ==
Historian Omeljan Pritsak proposed a hypothesis linking the name Kuya with the Arabic name for Kiev—Kuyaba. Pritsak saw this as evidence of Khazar participation in the founding of the city. However, this version has not gained acceptance in historiography, as it is not confirmed by factual evidence and is considered internally contradictory.

== See also ==
- Kyi, Shchek and Khoryv (a legend)

== Sources ==
- Golb, Norman; Pritsak, Omeljan (1982). Khazarian Hebrew Documents of the Tenth Century. Ithaca: Cornell University Press. ISBN 978-0-8014-1221-9.
- Kalinina, Tatiana M. (2025). "Мусульмане степей Восточной Европы и воины ал-ларисийа (ал-арсийа)" [Muslims of the Steppes of Eastern Europe and the al-Larisiya (al-Arsiya) Warriors] (PDF). In Mukhetdinov, Damir V. (ed.). ХХ «Фаизхановские чтения»: материалы международной научно-образовательной конференции [XX "Faizkhanov Readings": Materials of the International Scientific and Educational Conference] (in Russian). Moscow: Medina. pp. 81–90. ISBN 978-5-9756-0377-7.
- Tolochko, Peter P. (2018-10-02). "The Myth of the Judeo-Khazar Founding of Kiev". Anthropology & Archeology of Eurasia. 57 (4): 294–305. doi:10.1080/10611959.2018.1536635. ISSN 1061-1959.
