= Balakovo =

Town in Saratov Oblast, Russia

Balakovo Балаково
- City
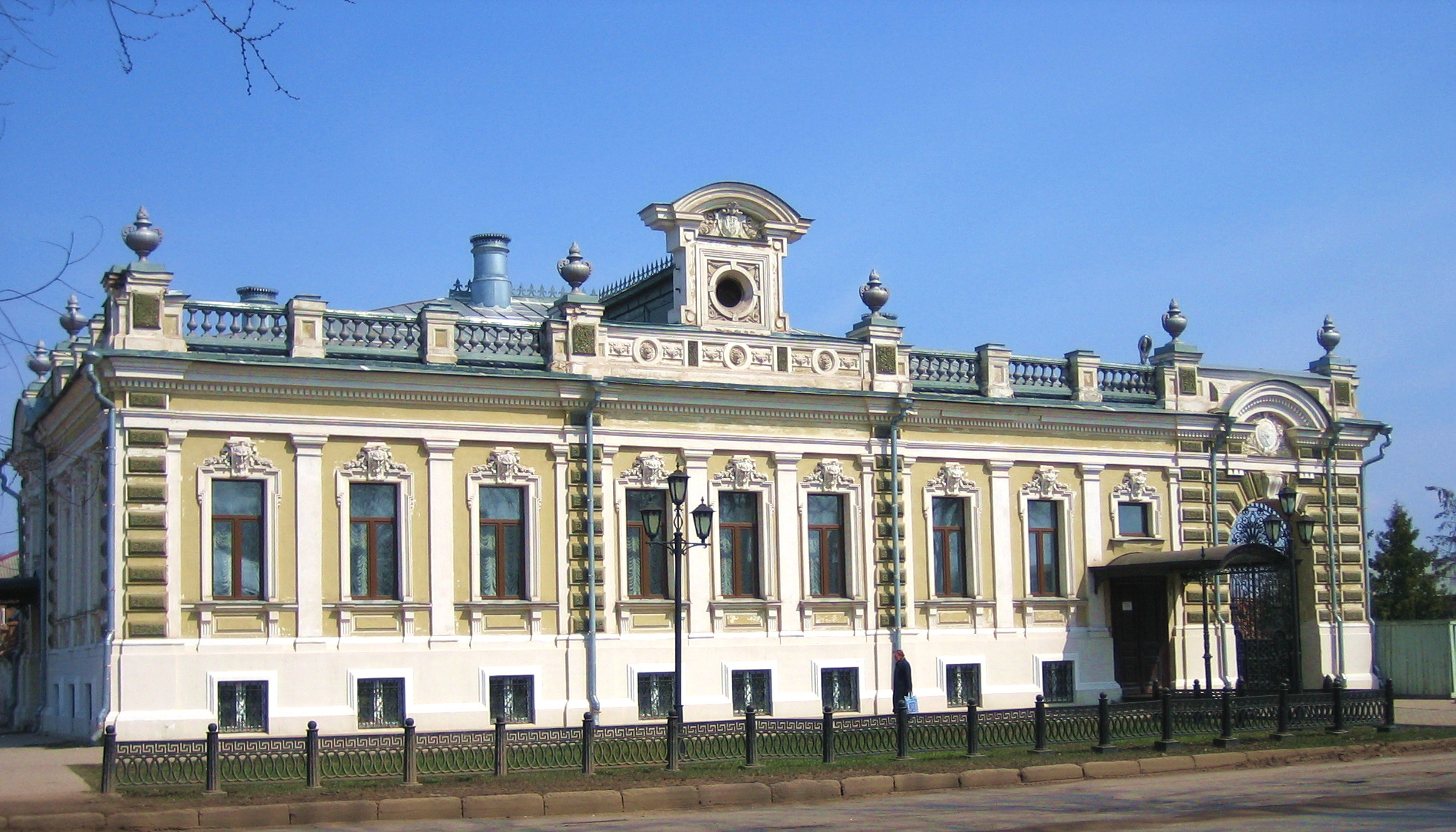
- Maltsev Manor in the historical part of the city

- Coat of arms
- Interactive map of Balakovo
- Location of Balakovo Balakovo (Saratov Oblast)
- Coordinates: 52°02′N 47°47′E
- Country: Russia
- Federal subject: Saratov Oblast
- Founded: 1762
- City status since: 1911

Government
  - Body: Council
  - Head: Barulin Sergey Vladimirovich
- Elevation: 25 m (82 ft)

Population (2010 Census)
  - Total: 199,690
  - Estimate (2025): 180,694 (−9.5%)
  - Rank: 94th in 2010

Administrative status
  - Subordinated to: city of oblast significance of Balakovo
  - Capital of: Balakovsky District, city of oblast significance of Balakovo

Municipal status
  - Municipal district: Balakovsky Municipal District
  - Urban settlement: Balakovo Urban Settlement
  - Capital of: Balakovsky Municipal District, Balakovo Urban Settlement
- Time zone: UTC+4 (MSK+1)
- Postal codes: 413840, 413841, 413843, 413849–413851, 413853, 413855–413861, 413863–413866
- Dialing code: +7 8453
- OKTMO ID: 63607101001
- Website: mo-balakovo.ru

Balakovo (Russian: Балако́во, IPA: [bəlɐˈkovə]) is a city in Saratov Oblast, Russia, located on the East bank of the Volga River about 131 kilometers (81 mi) northeast of Saratov, the administrative center of the oblast. Population: 199,690 (2010 census); 200,470 (2002 census); 197,391 (1989 Soviet census).

Historical population
Year	Pop.	±%
1897	16,000	—
1926	19,000	+18.8%
1939	23,179	+22.0%
1959	36,428	+57.2%
1970	103,495	+184.1%
1979	151,560	+46.4%
1989	197,391	+30.2%
2002	200,470	+1.6%
2010	199,690	−0.4%
2021	184,466	−7.6%
Source: Census data

== History ==
It was founded in 1762 by the Old Believers who returned from Poland and was granted town status in 1911.

=== Russian Empire ===
For a long time it was believed that the city of Balakovo was founded in 1762, but later a document dated 1738 was found in the archives of St. Petersburg, which mentions the Cossack meadow possession of Balakov Yurt, located two versts from the Volga. December 14, 1762 Empress of Russia Catherine II issued a manifesto calling on the Old Believers, who had fled to Poland, to return from abroad to Russia and settle on the lands between the Bolshoy and Maly Irgiz rivers. To the zealots of the old faith, 70,000 dessiatins (76,300 hectares) of the best land on the left bank of the Volga were allocated for use. Returned Old Believers founded several new settlements, including the village of Balakovo. In 1861 there were 2,700 people living in the village of Balakovo. The convenient location on the shipping routes helped the village to grow rapidly due to wheat trade. In one season, up to 10 million poods of grain were sent from Balakovo. More than 300 spacious barns that stood on the shore of Balakovo, allowed to store grain from harvest to harvest. In the 1860s for one navigation, from Balakovo could go up to 180 barges with cargo. Another commodity, to which the Balakovo merchants traded in huge quantities, was the forest. Balakovo was an intermediary between the forest provinces of the Upper Volga region and the forestless left bank of the Volga. Here, from such rivers as Kama, Belaya, Vyatka, it was brought annually up to 500 thousand poods of firewood and up to three million poods of forest building materials. Part of this forest was processed in two sawmills.

With the development of trade, the pier freight turnover grew, the fleet of freight and passenger ships increased. To repair them, the ship-repair industry was created. In 1897 the population of the village reached 18,388 people.

The beginning of the 20th century was marked by a significant expansion of the borders of the village, as well as an increase in the number of industrial enterprises. In May 1911, the Highest Ordinance was signed to confer on Balakovo the status of a city with the rights of self-government. Ivan Mamin, the industrialist, became the first city head. On the eve of the 1917 revolution, there were 6 churches, 7 schools, the grain market, the ironworks of Fyodor Blinov and the mechanical plant of oil engines of the Mamin brothers, ship repair and furniture workshops, sawmills, mills, a commercial college opened in 1910, with considerable financial assistance of the merchant - a patron of Ivan Kobzar, the Zemsky hospital and the city factory ambulance (polyclinic), a library, and a power plant, which was organized by the "Light" partnership.

Inventors Fyodor Abramovich Blinov and Yakov Mamin, which were self taught, glorified Balakovo as the birthplace of the world's first caterpillar tractor, wheel self-propelled gun and Russian diesel engine. The plant of oil engines and tractors (Yakov Mamin) produced 325 diesel engines, with a total capacity of 5100 horsepower in 1915. The image of the old Balakovo was created by such architects as H. F. Meyer and academician Fyodor Schechtel. The people of Balakovo constantly improved the city by restoring historical landscape within, by creating new aesthetic and appearance. Straight and spacious avenues, and slender buildings with elegant facades that preserved the culture.

=== Soviet Union ===
Until 1928, Balakovo was part of the Samara Governorate (Balakovo county existed in 1919–1924), after the Lower Volga region, from December 5, 1936, to the Saratov Oblast.

In the period from 1956 to 1971, the Saratov Hydroelectric Station was built in Balakovo, which led to the flooding of the Volga and the flooding of part of the coastal territory and the changing appearance of the modern city, as well as its sharp growth associated with obtaining the necessary electricity. In a short time the Balakovo industrial complex was created, numbering more than two dozen enterprises of chemistry, engineering, energy, construction industry, food industry. In 1985, the first power unit of the Balakovo Nuclear Power Plant was put into operation, which currently has 4 operating power units.

As a result of the referendum on December 22, 1996, the Balakovo municipal formation was created, which included the city of the regional subordination of Balakovo and the rural Balakovo district. In 2004 the Balakovo municipal formation was renamed Balakovo municipal district.

== Administrative and municipal status ==
Within the framework of administrative divisions, Balakovo serves as the administrative center of Balakovsky District, even though it is not a part of it. As an administrative division, it is incorporated separately as the city of oblast significance of Balakovo—an administrative unit with the status equal to that of the districts. As a municipal division, the city of oblast significance of Balakovo is incorporated within Balakovsky Municipal District as Balakovo Urban Settlement.

== Economy ==
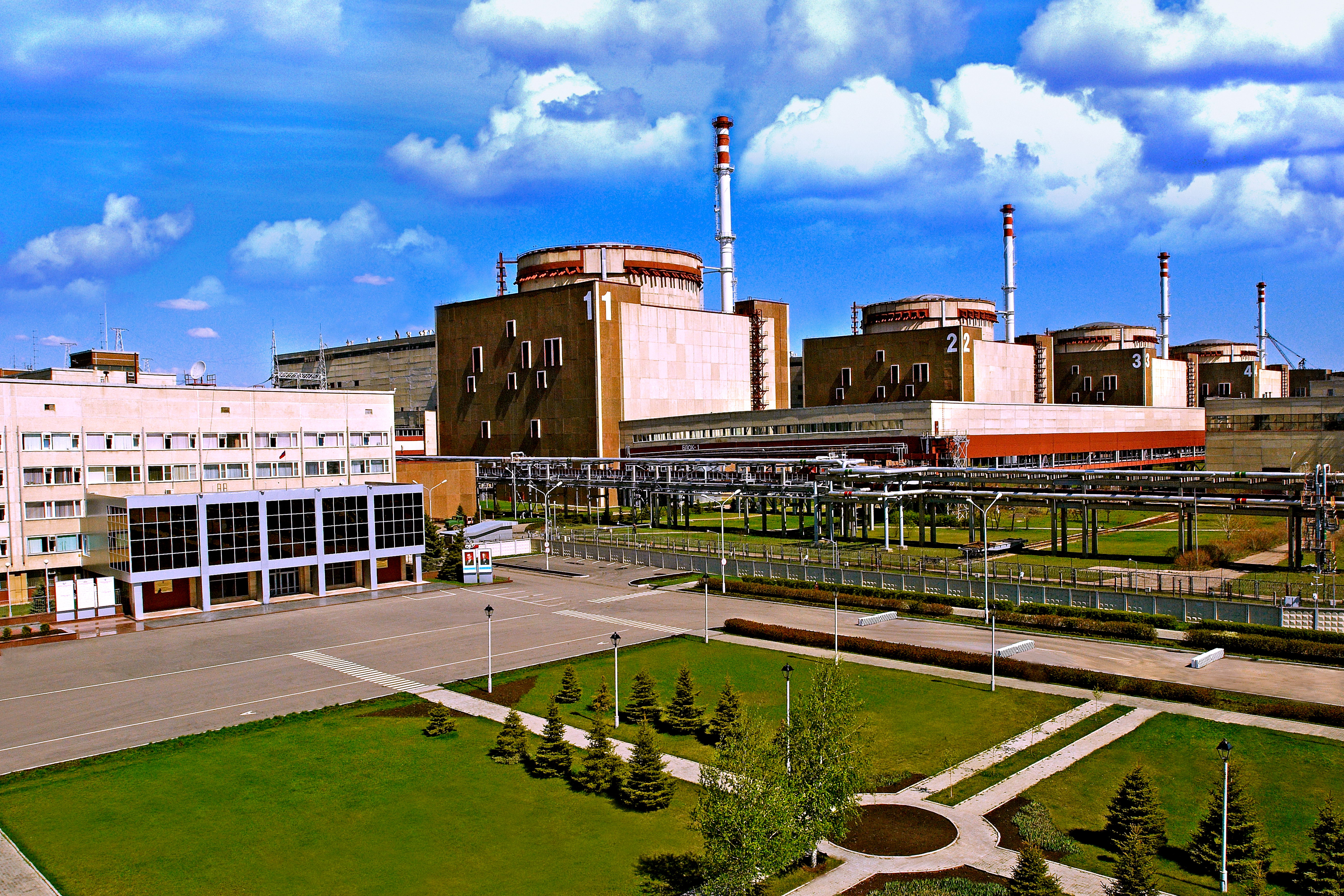
Balakovo Nuclear Power Plant

Balakovo is the location of the Saratov Hydroelectric Station on the Volga River and the Balakovo Nuclear Power Plant. It is served by the Balakovo Airport which currently does not work. Balakovo has a rail connection to Moscow, and is an end destination for some train routes.

== Geography ==
=== Climate ===
Balakovo has a humid continental climate (Köppen: Dfa) with long cold winters and warm, often hot summers. The warmest month is July with daily mean temperature near +22 °C (72 °F); the coldest month is February with −8 °C (18 °F). Balakovo has distinct cold and warm seasons, like cold winters and warm summers. The temperatures at night are cooler than during daytime.

Winter has prolonged freezing periods, with the coldest month most often being December. August is on average the month with most sunshine. Rainfall and other precipitation has no distinct peak month, but June is slightly the wettest.

Climate data for Balakovo
Month	Jan	Feb	Mar	Apr	May	Jun	Jul	Aug	Sep	Oct	Nov	Dec	Year
Record high °C (°F)	8 (46)	8 (46)	17 (63)	31 (88)	34 (93)	40 (104)	41 (106)	41 (106)	38 (100)	25 (77)	16 (61)	11 (52)	41 (106)
Mean daily maximum °C (°F)	−5 (23)	−4 (25)	1 (34)	13 (55)	21 (70)	26 (79)	28 (82)	27 (81)	20 (68)	12 (54)	3 (37)	−3 (27)	12 (53)
Daily mean °C (°F)	−8 (18)	−8 (18)	−3.5 (25.7)	8 (46)	15 (59)	20 (68)	21.5 (70.7)	20.5 (68.9)	14.5 (58.1)	7.5 (45.5)	0 (32)	−6 (21)	6.8 (44.2)
Mean daily minimum °C (°F)	−11 (12)	−12 (10)	−6 (21)	3 (37)	9 (48)	14 (57)	15 (59)	14 (57)	9 (48)	3 (37)	−3 (27)	−9 (16)	2 (36)
Record low °C (°F)	−37 (−35)	−35 (−31)	−27 (−17)	−17 (1)	−3 (27)	2 (36)	6 (43)	4 (39)	−2 (28)	−12 (10)	−23 (−9)	−33 (−27)	−37 (−35)
Average precipitation mm (inches)	39 (1.5)	31 (1.2)	31 (1.2)	30 (1.2)	38 (1.5)	42 (1.7)	35 (1.4)	27 (1.1)	41 (1.6)	34 (1.3)	35 (1.4)	35 (1.4)	418 (16.5)
Average rainy days	3	2	4	6	7	6	6	5	6	9	7	4	65
Average snowy days	16	12	7	1	0	0	0	0	0	2	8	14	60
Average relative humidity (%)	85	84	81	65	54	58	56	55	59	72	84	86	70
Source 1: Myweather.com
Source 2: Meteoblue.com

== Infrastructure ==
Passenger transportations are carried out by buses, route taxis, taxis and trolleybuses. In 2002 a new section of the contact network was put into operation, which allowed increasing the number of trolleybus routes.

The connection between the two parts of the city is carried out by the lock bridge. In 2003, it was decided to build a second bridge across the Navigable Canal. Since December 9, 2015 the Bridge "Victory Bridge" has been put into operation.

There is a bus station "Balakovo", railway station Balakovo, railway station "Linyovo" (for freight trains, electric trains), river station, river port, ship repair port.

Earlier in Balakovo, there was a similar airport (located near the village of Malaya Bykovka), which until the late 1990s received regular flights. In 2003 the airport was closed.

== Sports ==
There is a speedway team called Speedway Klub Turbina, that is six-time Soviet Union champion and three-time Russian champion. The Trud Stadium is located south west of the centre of the city, on the south side of the Volga and has hosted various international competitions.

== Notable people ==
- Anastasia Karpova (born 1984), pop singer
- Yevgeni Khlebodarov (born 1980), former footballer
- Andrei Kovalenko (born 1970), professional ice hockey forward
- Andrey Kudriashov (born 1991), speedway rider
- Dmitri Kugryshev (born 1990), professional ice hockey forward
- Ivan Maximkin (born 1988), professional ice hockey defenceman
- Artem Vodyakov (born 1991), speedway rider

== Twin towns – sister cities ==
Balakovo is twinned with:

- Trnava, Slovakia
- Cherepovets, Russia
- Scranton, Pennsylvania, United States
