= Neverkino =

Rural locality in Penza Oblast, Russia

Neverkino Неве́ркино
- Selo
- Location within Penza Oblast Location within Russia
- Coordinates: 52°47′06″N 46°44′06″E
- Country: Russia
- Federal subject: Penza Oblast
- District: Neverkinsky District

Neverkino (Russian: Неве́ркино) is a rural locality (a selo) and the administrative center of Neverkinsky District, Penza Oblast, Russia. The development of the locality’s population, by year: 4,376 (2010 census); 5,173 (2002 census); 4,816 (1989 Soviet census).

The highest point of Penza Oblast is an unnamed hill of the Khvalynsk Mountains reaching 342 metres (1,122 ft) above sea level located near Neverkino.
