= Penza Oblast =

First-level administrative division of Russia

Penza Oblast Пензенская область (Russian)
- Oblast
- Flag Coat of arms

- Coordinates: 53°15′N 44°34′E
- Country: Russia
- Federal district: Volga
- Economic region: Volga
- Established: February 4, 1939
- Administrative center: Penza

Government
  - Body: Legislative Assembly
  - Governor: Oleg Melnichenko

Area
  - Total: 43,352 km^{2} (16,738 sq mi)
  - Rank: 59th

Population (2021 census)
  - Total: 1,266,348
  - Estimate (2018): 1,331,655
  - Rank: 35th
  - Density: 29.211/km^{2} (75.656/sq mi)
  - Urban: 68.7%
  - Rural: 31.3%

GDP (nominal, 2024)
  - Total: ₽803 billion (US$9.42 billion)
  - Per capita: ₽652,090 (US$7,651.75)
- Time zone: UTC+3 (MSK)
- ISO 3166 code: RU-PNZ
- License plates: 58
- OKTMO ID: 56000000
- Official languages: Russian
- Website: http://pnzreg.ru

Penza Oblast (Russian: Пензенская область, IPA: [ˈpʲenzʲɪnskəjə ˈobɫəsʲtʲ]) is a federal subject of Russia (an oblast). Its administrative center is the city of Penza. As of the 2010 Census, its population was 1,266,348. It was formed in 1939 on the territory detached from neighboring Tambov Oblast.

== Geography ==
The highest point of Penza Oblast is an unnamed hill of the Khvalynsk range, reaching 342 metres (1,122 ft) above sea level, located at the southeastern end of the region near Neverkino.

=== Main rivers ===
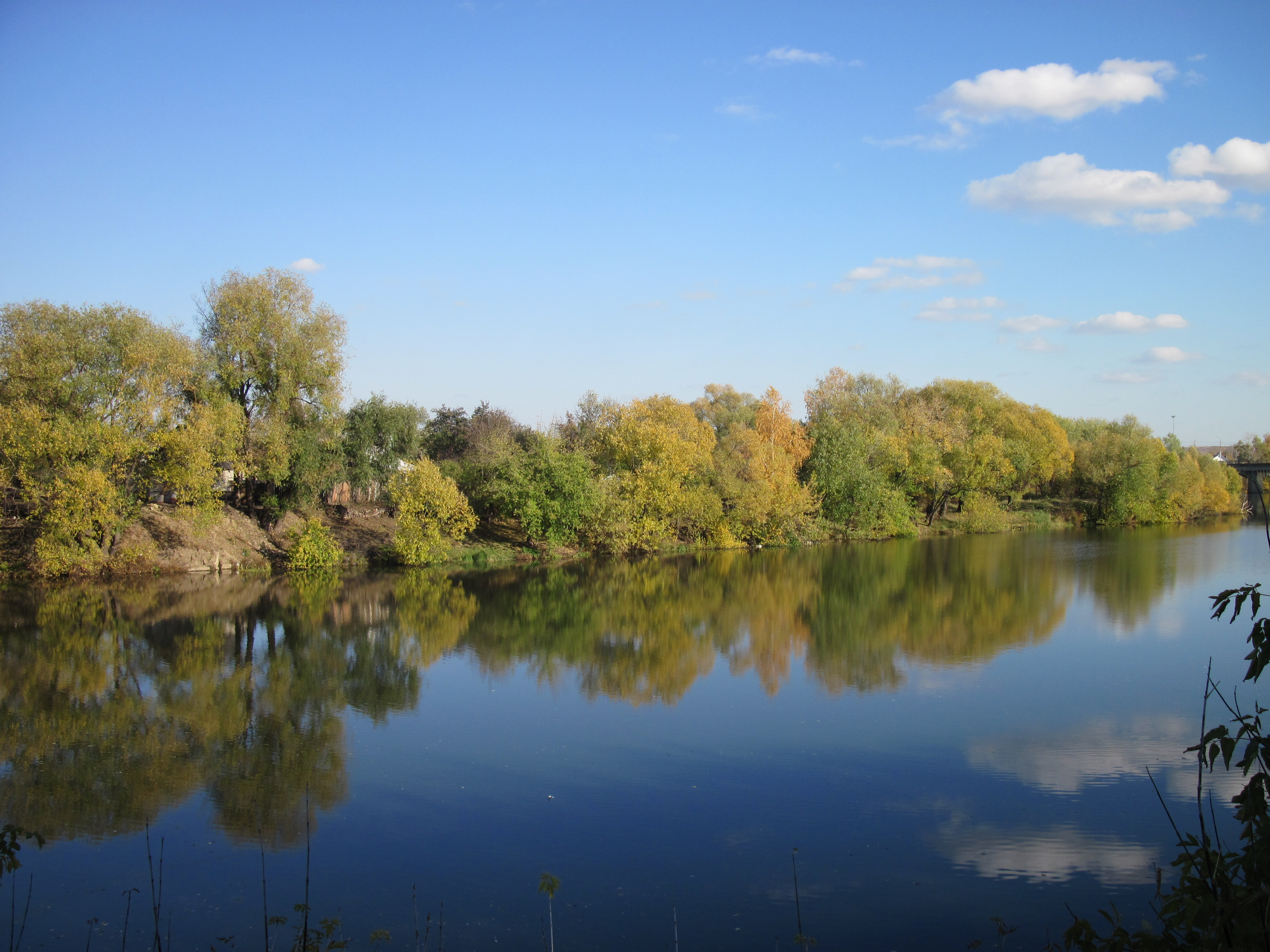
The Sura River

Depending on source or opinion, Penza Oblast has anywhere from 200 or 300 to 3,000 rivers, including smaller creeks, streams and waterways, measuring around 15,458 km in total length. The largest river to flow through the region is the Khopyor (also called the Vorona) at 979 km (608 mi), followed by the Sura at 841 km (523 mi), and the Moksha at 656 km (408 mi).

=== Fauna ===
There are over 300 documented species of vertebrate within Penza, including:

- at least 10 species of amphibians;
- over 250 species of birds;
- at least 10 species of reptiles;
- at least 50-70 species of mammals (badger, beech and pine marten, beaver, brown bear, dormouse, hamster, hedgehog, marmot, moose, otter, red fox, red squirrel, red and roe deer, shrew, stoat, voles (bank and common), water vole, weasel, wild boar, and more).

Several introduced, invasive, or otherwise non-native species of mammal have become naturalized in Penza Oblast, including the American mink (Neogale vison) and muskrat (Ondatra zibethicus), and the raccoon dog (Nyctereutes procyonoides) and sika deer (Cervus nippon), both from East Asia. With the exception of the sika deer, which was introduced for hunting purposes, the majority of non-native species in the region stem from the fur industry, after escaped or released animals thrived and created breeding populations, as the climate is similar to their native range. From a conservation standpoint, work has been carried out to reintroduce the Bobak or forest-steppe marmot, the Eurasian beaver, and the Russian desman (a species of mole that resembles a muskrat).

Several bat species inhabit Penza, including Brandt's bat, brown long-eared bat (Plecotus auritus), common noctule (Nyctalus noctula), Eurasian serotine (Cnephaeus serotinus), Kuhl's pipistrelle (Pipistrellus kuhlii) and the parti-coloured bat (Vespertilio murinus).

In the waters of Penza Oblast, there are between 30-50 species of fish. The Sura Reservoir alone is home to around 30 species. Commercial species include common and silver bream, pikeperch, ide, chub, and the giant wels catfish. In the ponds and smaller waterways dwell weather loach, common roach, European perch and carp, and northern pike. The most valuable fish to be found in the natural waters is the sterlet.

=== Climate ===
Climate data for Penza (1961-1990)
Month	Jan	Feb	Mar	Apr	May	Jun	Jul	Aug	Sep	Oct	Nov	Dec	Year
Record high °C (°F)	6.0 (42.8)	5.0 (41.0)	17.0 (62.6)	30.0 (86.0)	35.4 (95.7)	38.0 (100.4)	37.8 (100.0)	37.2 (99.0)	32.5 (90.5)	25.0 (77.0)	13.4 (56.1)	8.0 (46.4)	38.0 (100.4)
Mean daily maximum °C (°F)	−6.9 (19.6)	−5.8 (21.6)	0.3 (32.5)	11.7 (53.1)	21.2 (70.2)	24.4 (75.9)	25.7 (78.3)	23.7 (74.7)	17.6 (63.7)	8.9 (48.0)	0.4 (32.7)	−4.3 (24.3)	9.7 (49.5)
Daily mean °C (°F)	−9.8 (14.4)	−10.0 (14.0)	−4.2 (24.4)	6.4 (43.5)	13.9 (57.0)	18.0 (64.4)	19.2 (66.6)	17.1 (62.8)	11.6 (52.9)	4.5 (40.1)	−2.9 (26.8)	−7.7 (18.1)	4.7 (40.5)
Mean daily minimum °C (°F)	−13.9 (7.0)	−13.5 (7.7)	−7.1 (19.2)	1.7 (35.1)	8.1 (46.6)	12.5 (54.5)	14.2 (57.6)	11.9 (53.4)	7.1 (44.8)	1.3 (34.3)	−4.4 (24.1)	−10.4 (13.3)	0.6 (33.1)
Record low °C (°F)	−39.0 (−38.2)	−40.0 (−40.0)	−31.1 (−24.0)	−20.0 (−4.0)	−6.0 (21.2)	−2.2 (28.0)	2.0 (35.6)	0.6 (33.1)	−6.1 (21.0)	−17.2 (1.0)	−31.1 (−24.0)	−40.0 (−40.0)	−40.0 (−40.0)
Average precipitation mm (inches)	41 (1.6)	29 (1.1)	32 (1.3)	36 (1.4)	41 (1.6)	62 (2.4)	67 (2.6)	56 (2.2)	53 (2.1)	49 (1.9)	52 (2.0)	45 (1.8)	563 (22.2)
Source: Гидрометцентр, Погода и Климат

== History ==
The regional center of Penza was built in 1663 as a Russian fortress on the border of the Wild Fields, although evidence of the presence of more ancient settlements has been found in the modern city.

Penza Province was established within Kazan Governorate in 1718. It became a separate Penza Governorate on September 15, 1780, which existed until March 5, 1797, when it was dissolved and merged into Saratov Governorate. Penza Governorate was re-established on September 9, 1801 and existed until 1928. Between 1928 and 1937, the territory of the former governorate underwent a number of administrative transformations, ending up as a part of Tambov Oblast in 1937. On February 4, 1939, modern Penza Oblast was established by splitting it out of Tambov Oblast. In March 1939, the Penza Oblast Committee of the CPSU was formed, the first secretary of the committee being Alexander Kabanov.

The 2026 Penza Oblast mobilisation was disruptive for the region's society.

== Economy ==
Penza Oblast is part of the Volga economic region. The oblast is one of Russia's leading producers of wheat, rye, oats, millet, buckwheat, cereal and forage crops, vegetables, potatoes, mustard, and meat.

== Politics ==
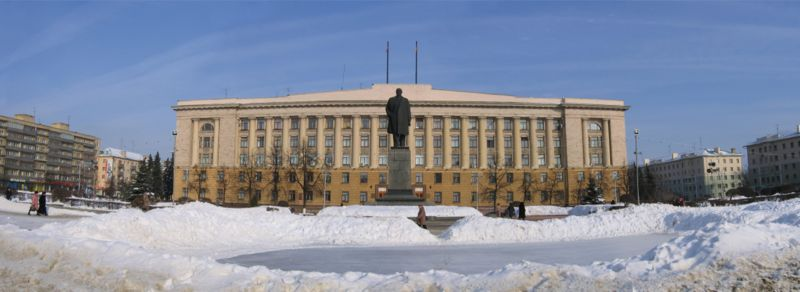
Seat of the Oblast government

During the Soviet period, the high authority in the oblast was shared among three persons: The first secretary of the Penza CPSU Committee (who in reality had the biggest authority), the chairman of the oblast Soviet (legislative power), and the Chairman of the oblast Executive Committee (executive power). Since 1991, CPSU lost all the power, and the head of the Oblast administration, and eventually the governor was appointed/elected alongside elected regional parliament.

The Charter of Penza Oblast is the fundamental law of the region. The Legislative Assembly of Penza Oblast is the province's standing legislative (representative) body. The Legislative Assembly exercises its authority by passing laws, resolutions, and other legal acts and by supervising the implementation and observance of the laws and other legal acts passed by it. The highest executive body is the Oblast Government, which includes territorial executive bodies such as district administrations, committees, and commissions that facilitate development and run the day to day matters of the province. The Oblast administration supports the activities of the Governor who is the highest official and acts as guarantor of the observance of the oblast Charter in accordance with the Constitution of Russia.

== Demographics ==
Historical population
Year	Pop.	±%
1897	1,470,474	—
1926	2,208,780	+50.2%
1959	1,507,765	−31.7%
1970	1,535,970	+1.9%
1979	1,503,198	−2.1%
1989	1,504,309	+0.1%
2002	1,452,941	−3.4%
2010	1,386,186	−4.6%
2021	1,266,348	−8.6%
Source: Census data

Population: 1,266,348 (2021 census); 1,386,186 (2010 census); 1,452,941 (2002 census); 1,504,309 (1989 Soviet census).

Vital statistics for 2024:

- Births: 7,736 (6.3 per 1,000)
- Deaths: 19,234 (15.6 per 1,000)

Total fertility rate (2024):
1.15 children per woman

Life expectancy (2021):
Total — 69.97 years (male — 65.17, female — 74.75)

Ethnic composition (2010):

- Russians: 86.8%
- Tatars: 6.4%
- Mordvins: 4.1%
- Ukrainians: 0.7%
- Chuvash: 0.4%
- Armenians: 0.3%
- Others ethnicities: 1.3%
- Additionally, 43,283 people were registered from administrative databases, and could not declare an ethnicity. It is estimated that the proportion of ethnicities in this group is the same as that of the declared group.
- Births: 7,962 (Jan-July 2008)
- Deaths: 13,608 (Jan-July 2008)

=== Religion ===
Religion in Penza Oblast as of 2012 (Sreda Arena Atlas)
Russian Orthodoxy	62.9%
Other Orthodox	0.7%
Other Christians	2.2%
Islam	5.7%
Spiritual but not religious	14.6%
Atheism and irreligion	9.1%
Other and undeclared	4.8%

According to a 2012 survey, 62.9% of the population of Penza Oblast adheres to the Russian Orthodox Church, 2% are unaffiliated generic Christians, 1% are Orthodox Christian believers without belonging to churches or members of non-Russian Orthodox churches, and 7% are Muslims. In addition, 15% of the population declares to be "spiritual but not religious", 9% is atheist, and 3.1% follows other religions or did not give an answer to the question.

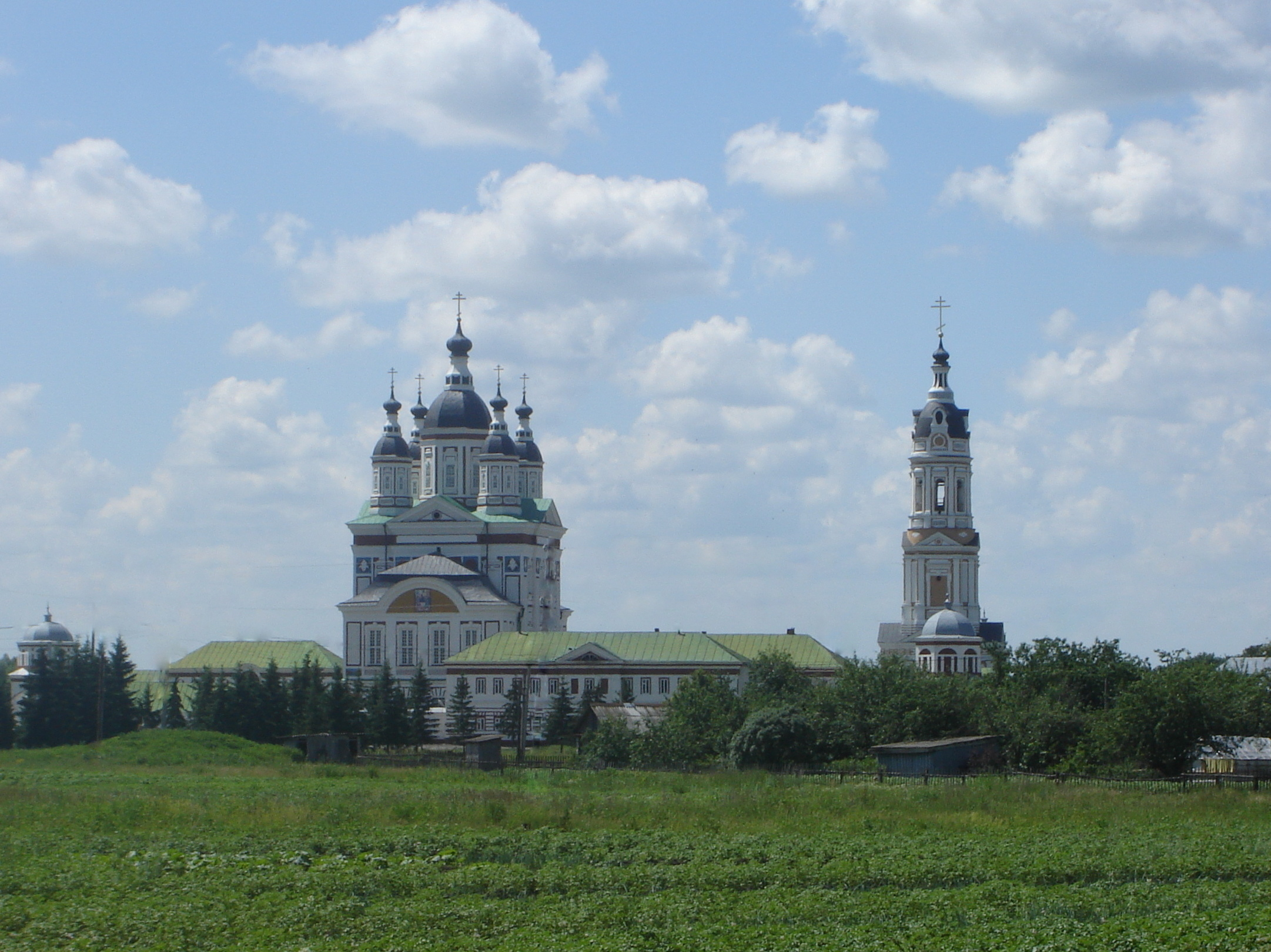
Troitse-Scanov Convent

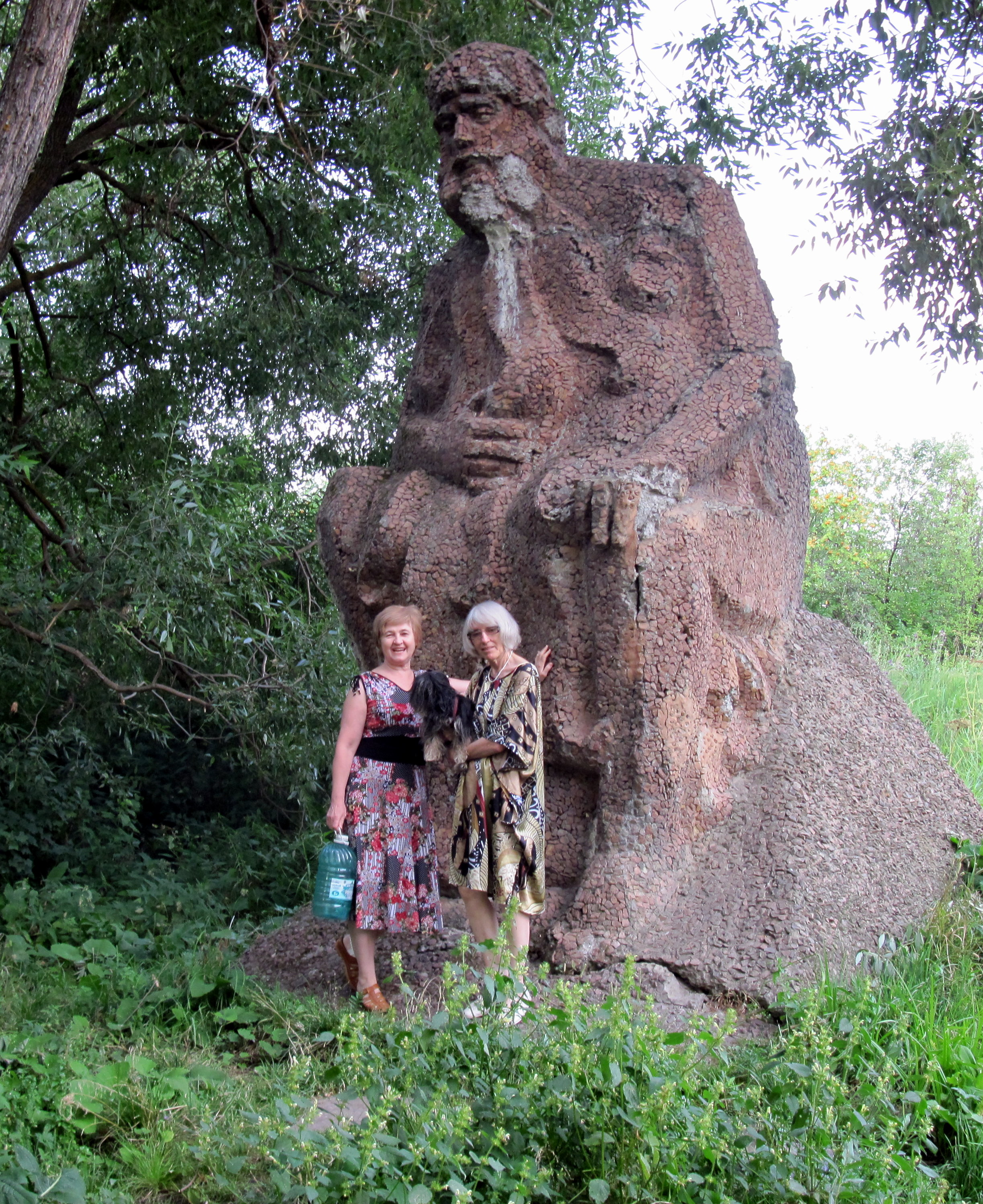
Tourists near Oldman Khopyor at river source

== Culture and recreation ==
=== Tourism ===
- Troitse-Scanov Convent
- State Lermontov Museum and Reserve of Tarkhany

== Notable people ==
- Vasily Klyuchevsky (1841–1911) — a leading Russian historian of the late imperial period.
- Aristarkh Lentulov (1882–1943) – a Russian avant-garde artist of Cubist orientation who also worked on set designs for the theatre.
- Yevgeny Rodionov (1977–1996) – a Russian soldier who was murdered in Chechen captivity for his refusal to convert to Islam and defect to the enemy side.
- Victor Skumin (1948–) – a Russian scientist first describes "cardioprosthetic psychopathological syndrome", later known as Skumin syndrome, a form of anxiety suffered by recipients of artificial heart valves.
- Natalya Starovoyt, actress of Penza Oblast Drama Theatre

== See also ==
- List of Chairmen of the Legislative Assembly of Penza Oblast
