= Saratov Hydroelectric Station =

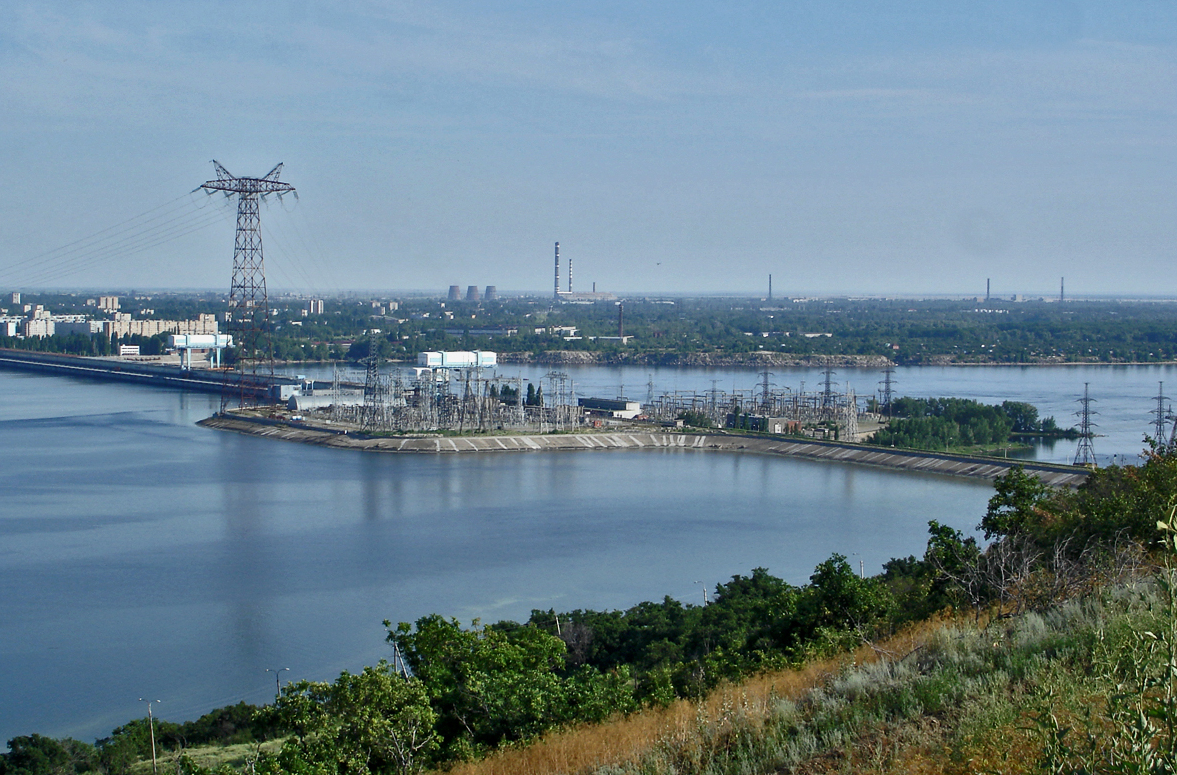
- The Balakovo Dam

- Location within Russia
- Official name: Саратовская ГЭС
- Location: Balakovo, Russia
- Coordinates: 52°03′11″N 47°45′18″E
- Construction began: 1956
- Opening date: November 1971

Dam and spillways
- Impounds: Volga River
- Height: 40 m (131 ft)
- Length: 1,260 m (4,134 ft)

Reservoir
- Creates: Saratov Reservoir
- Surface area: 1,831 km^{2} (707 mi^{2})

Power Station
- Turbines: 17 × 66 MW; 4 × 60 MW; 2 × 54 MW; 1 × 11 MW
- Installed capacity: 1,481 MW
- Annual generation: 5,352 GWh

The Saratov Hydroelectric Station or the Saratov GES (Russian: Саратовская ГЭС) also known as the Lenin Komsomol Saratov Hydroelectric Power Station (Russian: Саратовская ГЭС имени Ленинского Комсомола) is a hydroelectric power plant on the River Volga that is located in Balakovo, Saratov Oblast, 130 km northeast from the city of Saratov, Russia.

== History ==
The plant was built as part of the massive post-war industrialisation plan The great construction sites of communism, which was to form a Volga-Kama Cascade of hydroelectric dams. Construction was authorised by an order from the Council of Ministers of the Soviet Union on June 1, 1956.

Although the initial design had to be altered for practical reasons, the delay was long enough to allow the Kuybyshev GES to come online and provide direct power to the new building site. Many of the workers moved to the new city of Balakovo and their experience proved to be invaluable. The construction was declared to be all-union and in particular took a massive input from the nation's youth. Because of their large input the station was later named after the Communist Youth League, the Komsomol. By autumn 1967 the dam was completed and the river was blocked and in December of that year the first four powerhouses became operational. Overall the station was declared to be completed in November 1971.

== Technical details ==
Today the station consists of a 1,260 metre long, 40 metre high artificial dam flanked by landfilled earth dam which totals 14 kilometres in length, forming the Saratov Reservoir.

The station is rated at 1,481MW, producing an annual 5.352 billion KWh of energy. There are a total of 24 powerhouses, 17 rotor-blade at 66 MW, 4 rotor-blade at 60 MW and two horizontal turbines at 54 MW. In addition there is fishery path that generates a further 11 MW.

== Economic value ==
Today the station is a valuable asset to the Central region and the middle Volga. It powers several nearby industries and irrigates fertile adjacent land. Most of the city of Saratov is powered by the station; the rest of the energy is absorbed into the Russian national grid.

== Powerlines ==
The two 500 kV powerlines from Balakovo Nuclear Power Plant traverse the Saratov Hydroelectric Station, crossing the Volga River in a 1.6 kilometres long span. Only the south line connects at Saratov HES, while the north line continues to Nikolaevka Transmission Station without connection. The tower at Saratov Hydrolectric Station is 159 metres, that at the East shore of Volga River 197 metres tall. It is the tallest electricity pylon in Russia Source.

== See also ==
- List of conventional hydroelectric power stations
- List of power stations in Russia
