= Yevgeni Khlebodarov =

Russian footballer

Personal information
- Full name: Yevgeni Vladimirovich Khlebodarov
- Date of birth: 10 February 1980 (age 46)
- Place of birth: Balakovo, Russian SFSR
- Height: 1.85 m (6 ft 1 in)
- Positions: Midfielder; forward

Senior career*
Years	Team	Apps	(Gls)
1997	FC Volga Balakovo	12	(0)
1998–2000	FC Balakovo	43	(1)
2000–2001	FC Kavkazkabel Prokhladny	44	(19)
2002	PFC Spartak Nalchik	27	(1)
2003	FC Kavkazkabel Prokhladny	15	(2)
2004	FC Volga Ulyanovsk	19	(4)
2004–2005	FC Alnas Almetyevsk	20	(7)
2006	FC Gazovik Orenburg	13	(1)
2007–2008	FC Gubkin	22	(5)
2010	FC Syzran-2003 (D4)		
2011	FC Syzran-2003	20	(3)
- * Club domestic league appearances and goals

Yevgeni Vladimirovich Khlebodarov (Russian: Евгений Владимирович Хлебодаров; born 10 February 1980) is a former Russian football midfielder.

== Club career ==
He played in the Russian Football National League for PFC Spartak Nalchik in 2002.
