= Balakovo Airport =

Airport in Balakovo, Russia

Balakovo Airport Аэропорт Балаково
- IATA: BWO; ICAO: UWSB

Summary
- Airport type: Public
- Location: Balakovo
- Elevation AMSL: 95 ft / 29 m
- Coordinates: 51°51′0″N 47°45′0″E
- Interactive map of Balakovo Airport

Runways
Direction	Length		Surface
Direction	ft	m	Surface
03/21	8,225	2,507	Concrete

Balakovo Airport (Russian: Аэропорт Балаково) (IATA: BWO, ICAO: UWSB) is an airport in Russia located 19 km south of Balakovo. It is a civilian airport servicing medium-sized airliners up to Tu-154 and Il-76 size.

== See also ==
- List of airports in Russia
