= Balakovo Nuclear Power Plant =

Nuclear power plant in Saratov Oblast, Russia

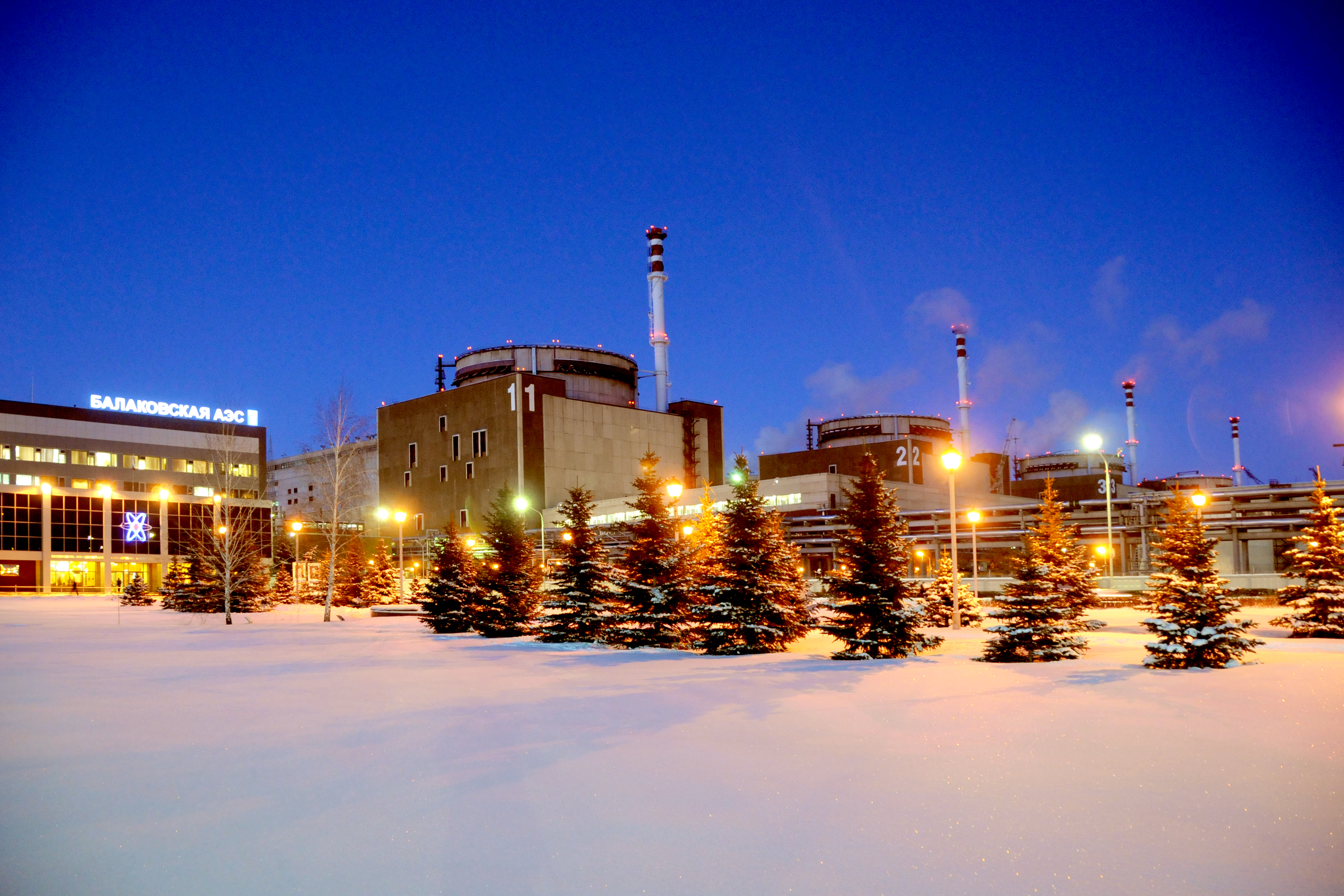
- Balakovo Nuclear Power Plant
- Country: Russia
- Coordinates: 52°5′28″N 47°57′19″E
- Status: Operational
- Construction began: December 1, 1980
- Commission date: May 23, 1986
- Owner: Rosenergoatom
- Operator: Rosenergoatom

Nuclear power station
- Reactor type: VVER

Power generation
- Units operational: 4 x 1,000 MW
- Units under const.: 1 x 1,000 MW
- Nameplate capacity: 4,000 MW
- Capacity factor: 82.9%
- Annual net output: 29,062 GW·h

External links
- Website: Official website
- Commons: Related media on Commons

Balakovo nuclear power station (Russian: Балаковская АЭС, romanized: Balakovskaya AES []) is a nuclear power plant located in the city of Balakovo, Saratov Oblast, Russia, about 900 kilometres (560 mi) south-east of Moscow. It consists of four operational reactors; the construction of the fifth and sixth unit was cancelled. The owner and operator of the nuclear power station is Rosenergoatom.

Balakovo NPP participates in a twinning program between nuclear power stations in Europe and Russia; since 1990 it has been in partnership with Biblis Nuclear Power Plant.

== Remix fuel tests ==
Balakovo Nuclear Power Plant is used for experiments with Remix Fuel. In December 2024, the third final 18-month phase of the pilot program started with the goal to achieve a closed nuclear cycle for VVER reactors. A mixture of enriched uranium with recycled uranium and plutonium received from the used nuclear fuel at other VVER reactors is used instead of standard enriched uranium, as used in most other reactors. After the first 2 stages of 3, the fuel elements were inspected and were approved for the 3rd and final stage. The 3rd stage should conclude in 2026 when the fuel will be unloaded and further studied. Remix fuel has a lower plutonium content of up to 5% when compared with MOX fuel.

== Reactor data ==
The Balakovo Nuclear Power Plant has four operating units:

Unit	Reactor type	Net capacity	Gross capacity	Construction started	Connected to grid	Commercial operation	Shutdown
Balakovo-1	VVER-1000/320	950 MW	1,000 MW	1980-12-01	1985-12-28	1986-05-23	2045 planned
Balakovo-2	VVER-1000/320	950 MW	1,000 MW	1981-08-01	1987-10-08	1988-01-12	2043 planned
Balakovo-3	VVER-1000/320	950 MW	1,000 MW	1982-11-01	1988-12-25	1989-04-08	2048 planned
Balakovo-4	VVER-1000/320	950 MW	1,000 MW	1984-04-01	1993-05-12	1993-12-22	2053 planned
Balakovo-5	VVER-1000/320	950 MW	1,000 MW	1987-04-01	-	-	Construction suspended 1992-12-28
Balakovo-6	VVER-1000/320	950 MW	1,000 MW	1988-05-01	-	-	Construction suspended 1992-12-28

In 2018 Rosatom announced it had developed a thermal annealing technique for reactor pressure vessels which ameliorates radiation damage and extends service life by between 15 and 30 years. This had been demonstrated on unit 1.

== Gallery ==
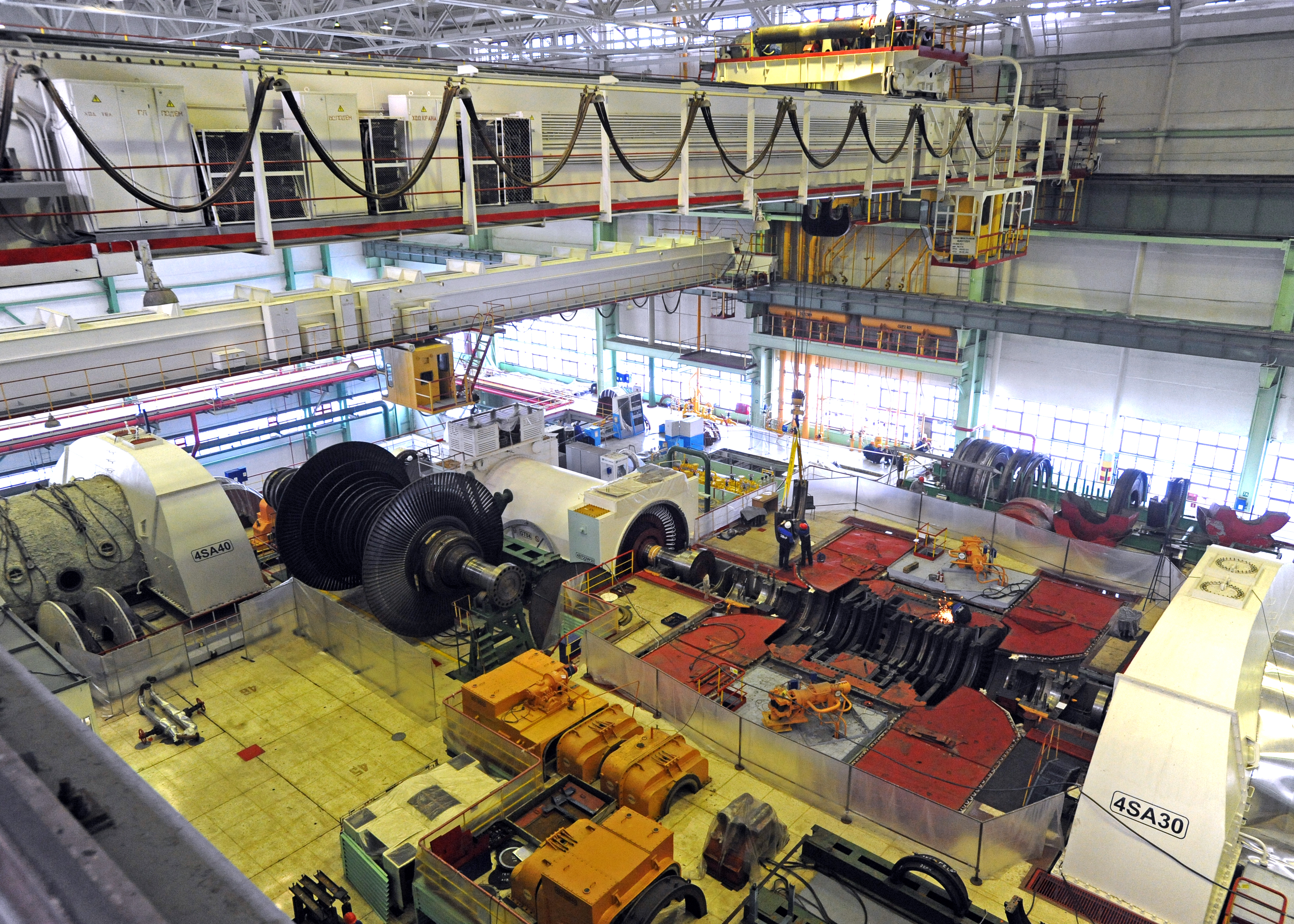
Interior View

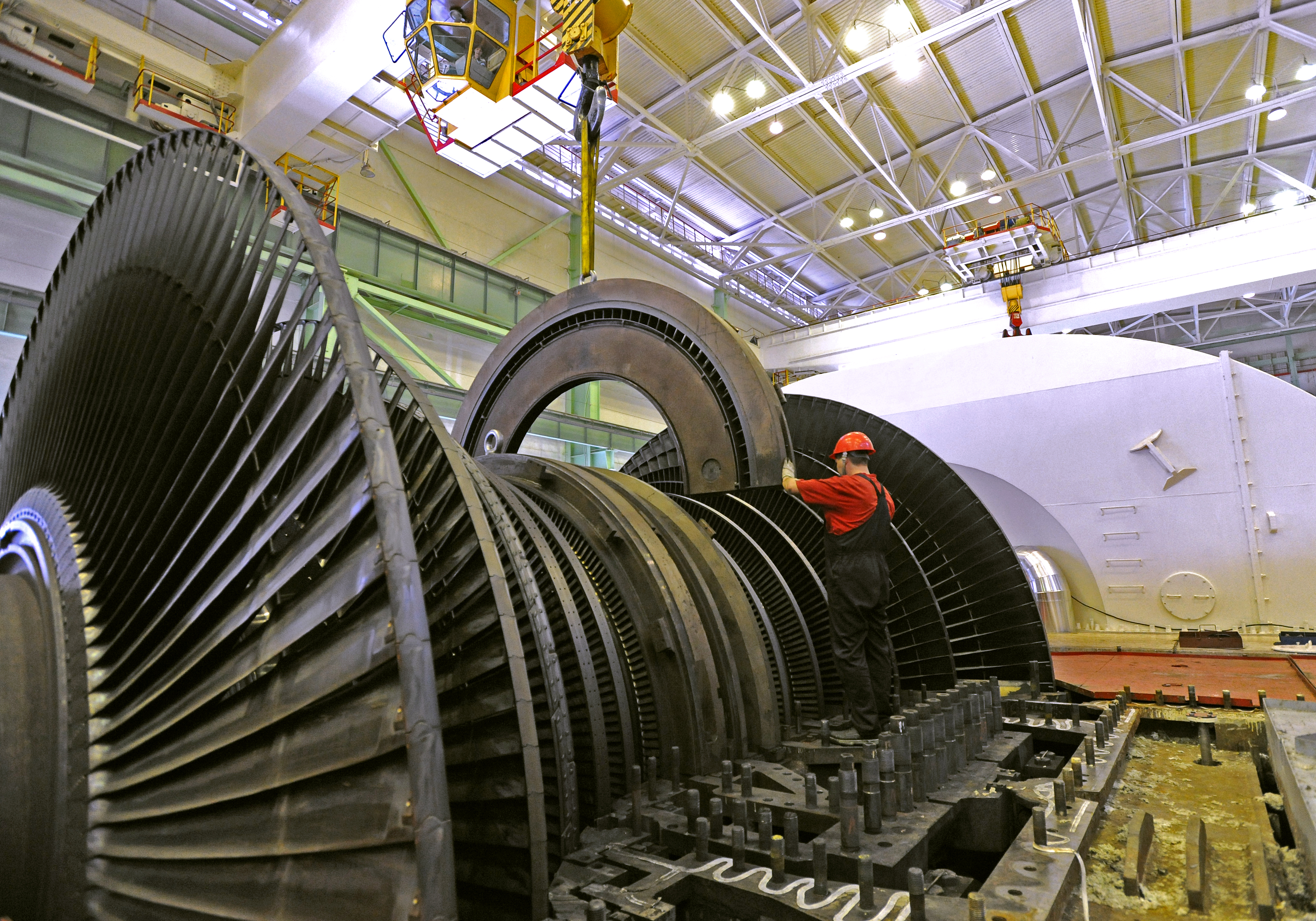
Steam Turbine Maintenance

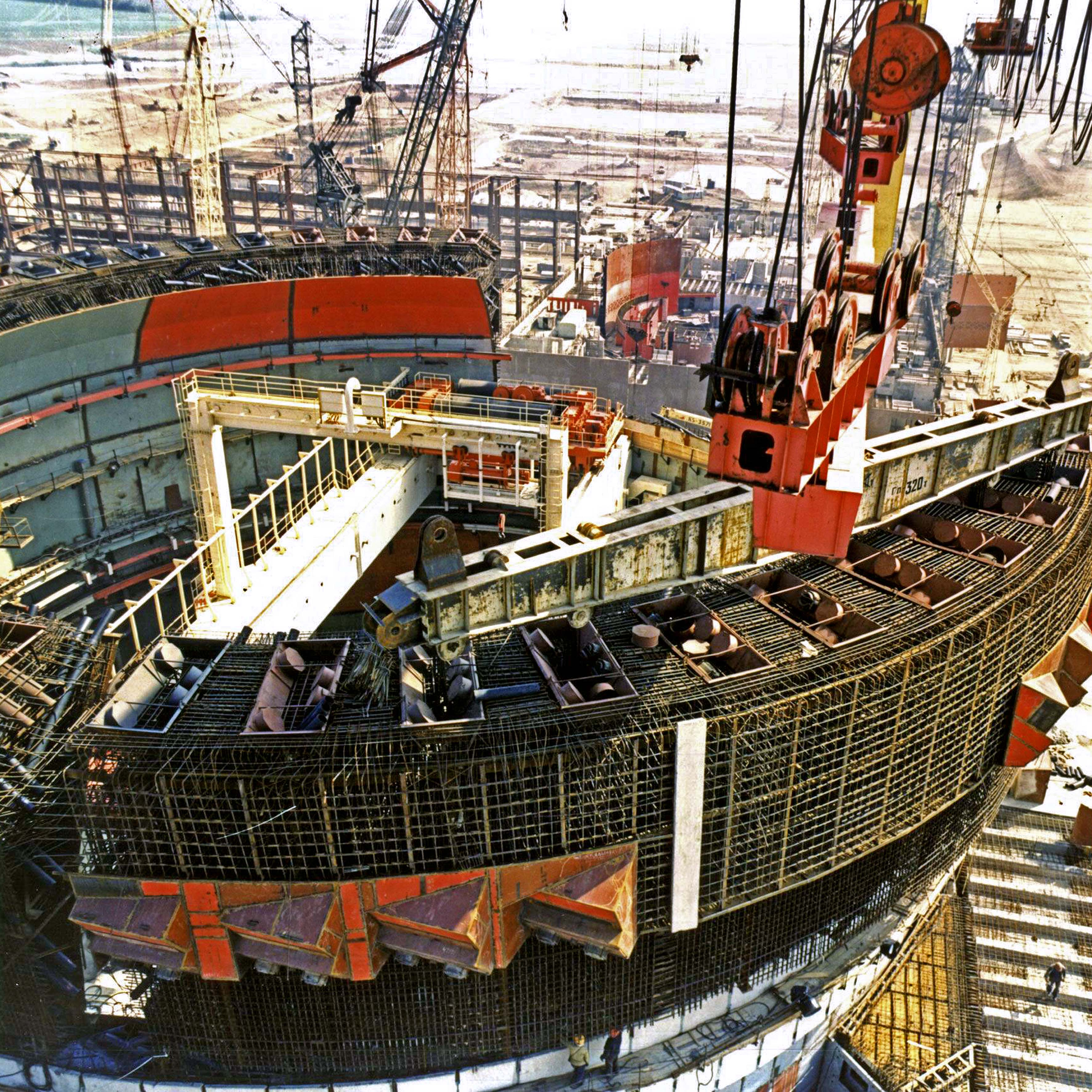
Reactor under Construction

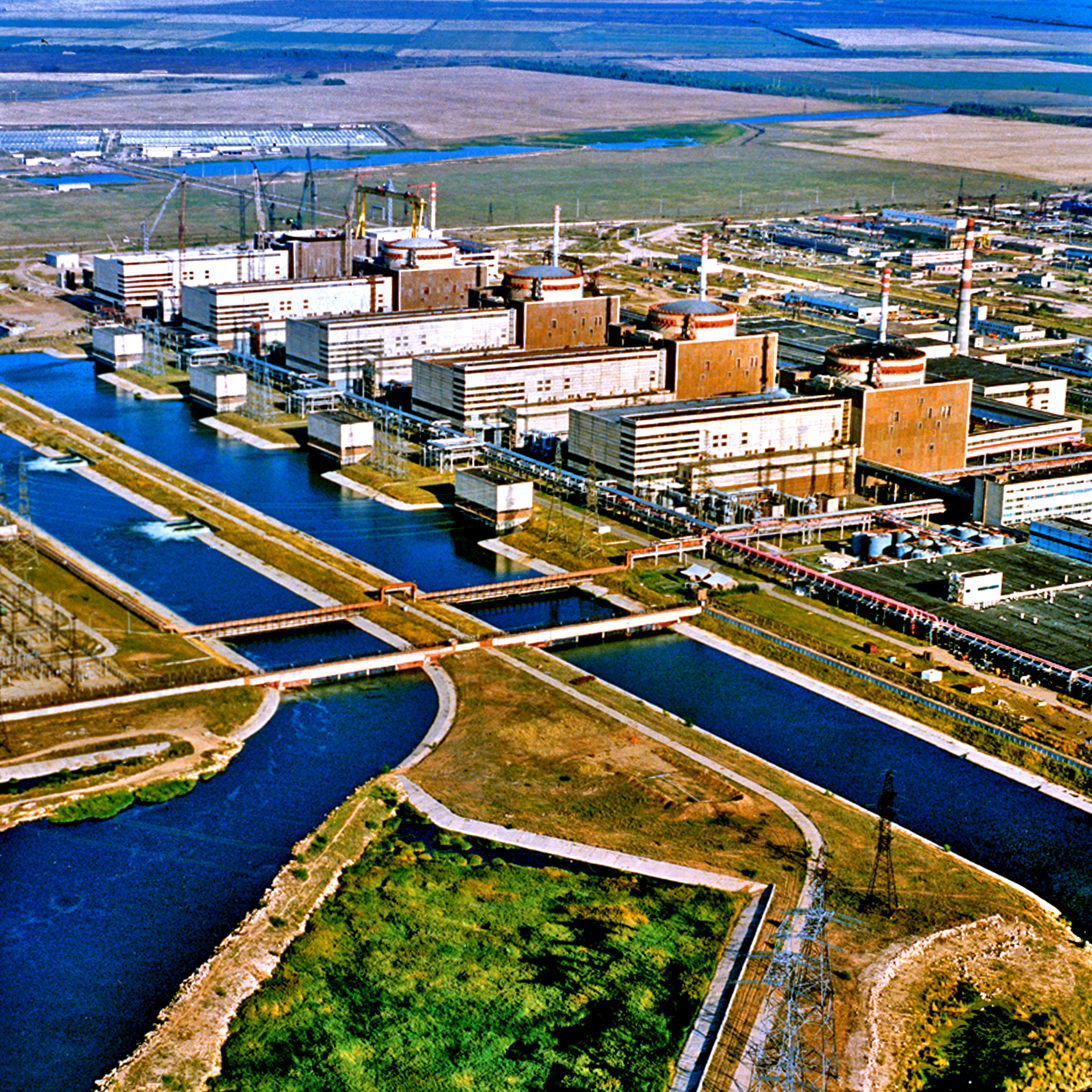
Aerial View

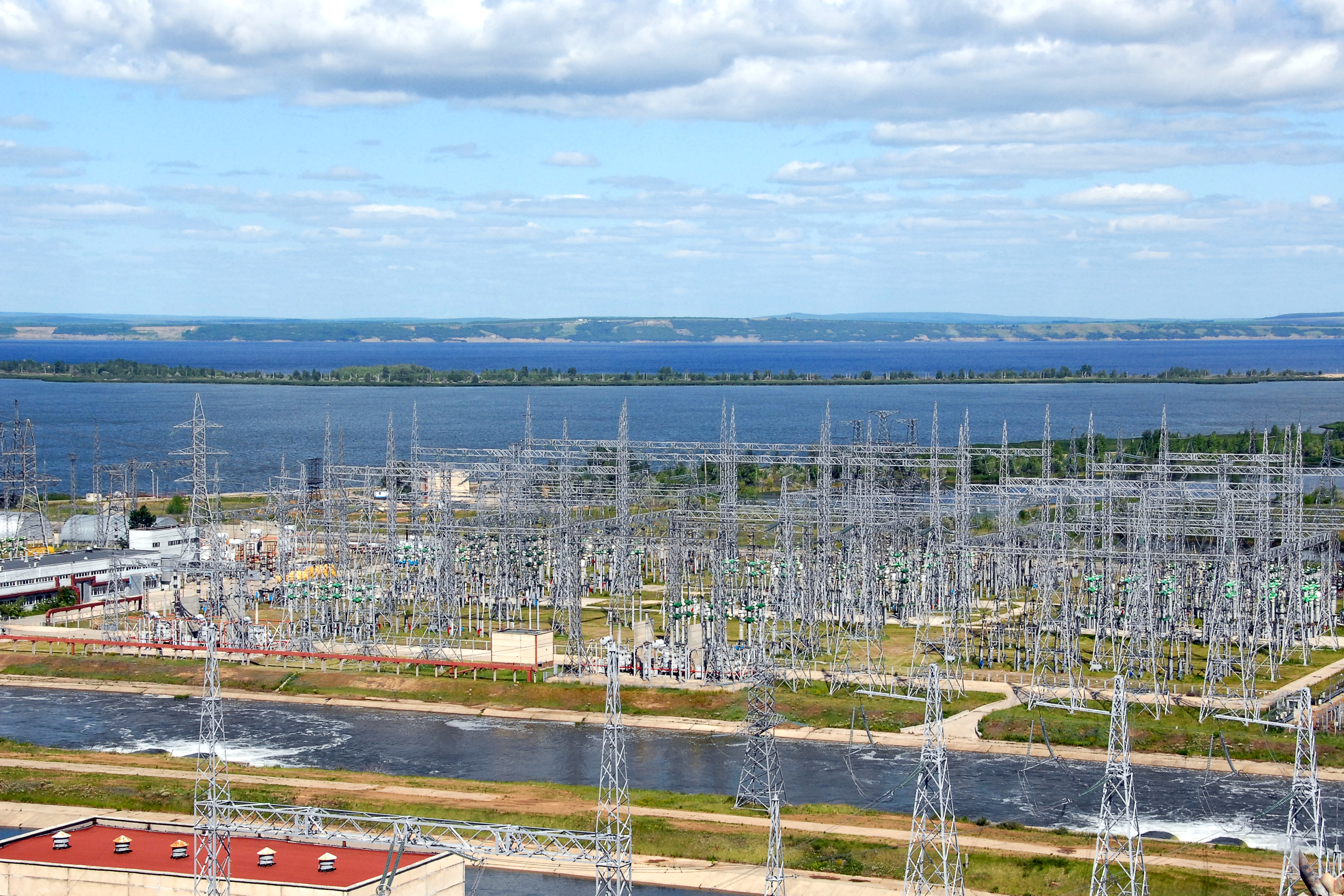
Distribution Station

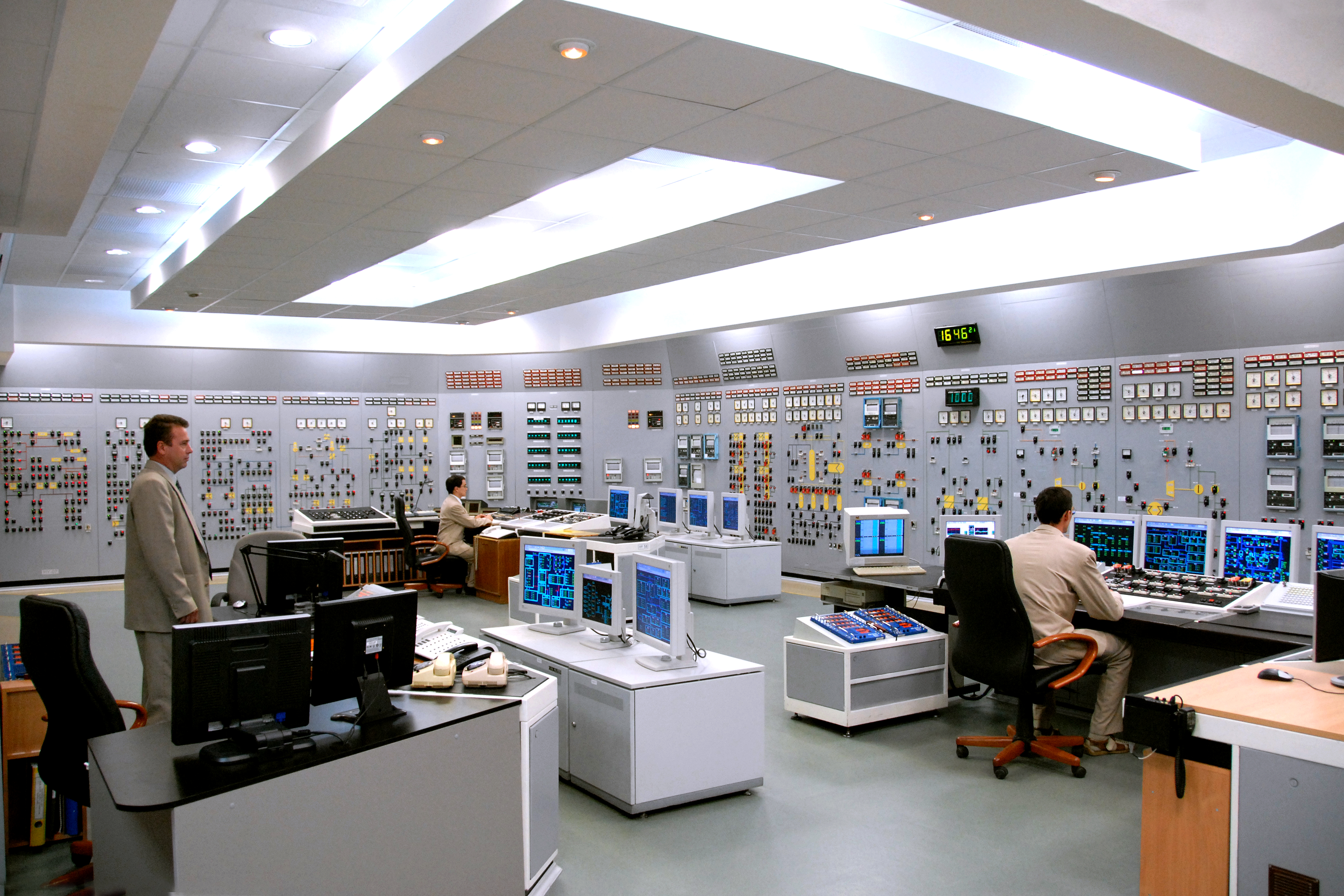
Control Room

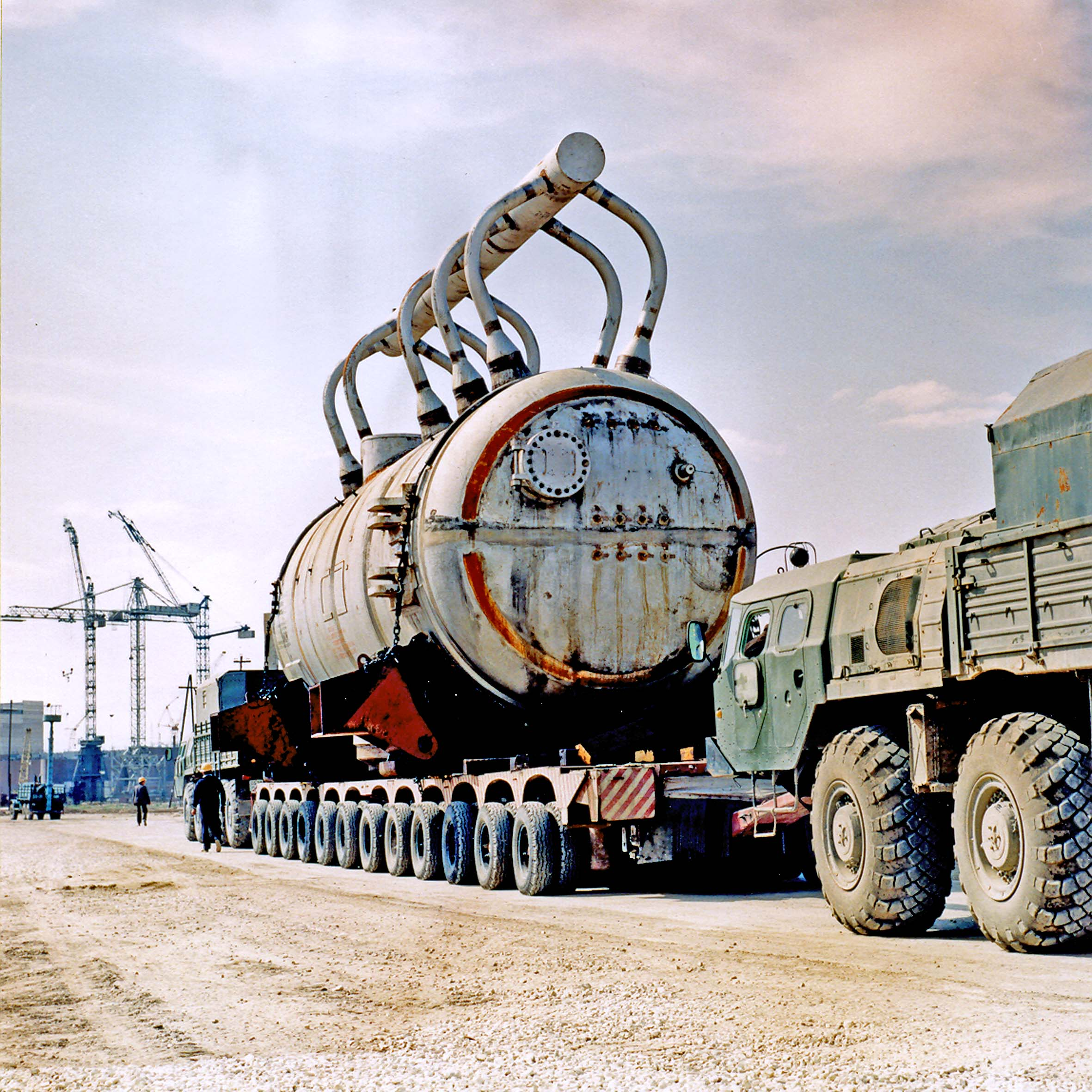
Steam Generator Transport

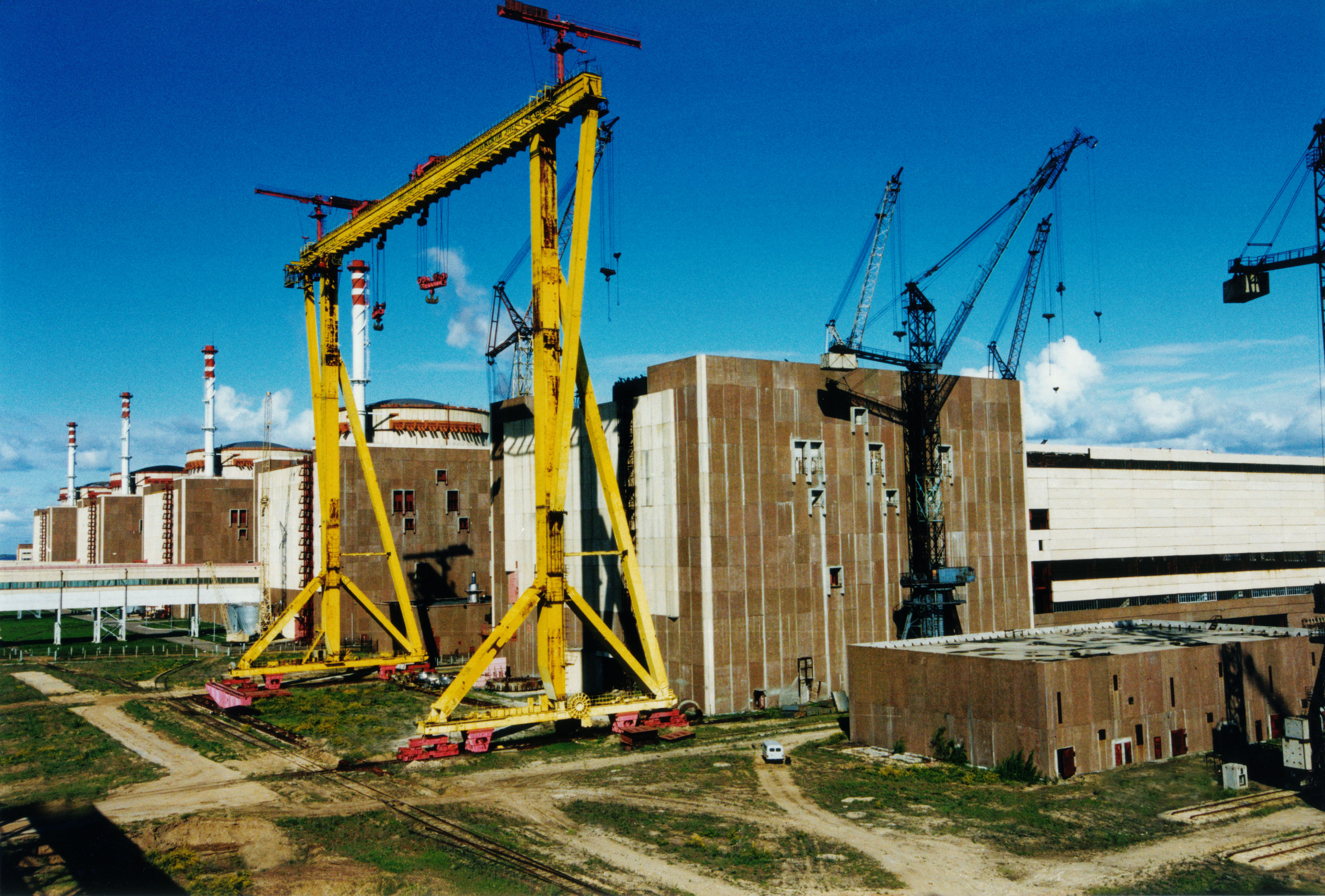
Unit 5 Construction

== Incidents ==
On 27 June 1985 during startup of the first reactor unit, a human error (later attributed to inexperience and haste) unexpectedly opened a pressurizer relief valve, and 300 °C (572 °F) steam caused an explosion of the turbine and entered the staff work area. Fourteen people were killed. This event is cited as one of the predecessors of the Chernobyl disaster.

== See also ==
- Nuclear power in Russia
