= Ivan Maximkin =

Russian ice hockey player (born 1988)

- Born: March 5, 1988 (age 37); Balakovo, Russian SFSR, Soviet Union
- Height: 6 ft 3 in (191 cm)
- Weight: 190 lb (86 kg; 13 st 8 lb)
- Position: Defence
- Shot: Left
- Played for: Lada Togliatti; Dynamo Moscow
- Playing career: 2005–2015

Ivan Maximkin (born March 5, 1988) is a Russian former professional ice hockey defenceman.

Maximkin played in the Russian Superleague and Kontinental Hockey League for Lada Togliatti and Dynamo Moscow. He also had spells in the Kazakhstan Hockey Championship for Kazakhmys Satpaev, Saryarka Karagandy, Kazzinc-Torpedo and HC Astana.

Maximkim was selected 28th overall in the 2005 CHL Import Draft by the Ontario Hockey League's Erie Otters, though he ultimately never played in the league and remained in Russia.
