= Maly Irgiz =

Location
- Country: Russia

Physical characteristics
- Source
  - location: Saratov Oblast
- Mouth: Volga
  - location: Saratov Reservoir
  - coordinates: 52°11′53″N 48°30′32″E
- Length: 235 km (146 mi)
- Basin size: 3,900 km^{2} (1,500 sq mi)
- Discharge
  - average: 6.4 m^{3}/s (230 cu ft/s)

Basin features
- Progression: Volga→ Caspian Sea

The Maly Irgiz (Russian: Малый Ирги́з, lit. 'Little Irgiz') is a river in Saratov Oblast, Russia, a left tributary of the Volga. It is 235 kilometres (146 mi) long, with a drainage basin of 3,900 square kilometres (1,500 mi^{2}). The river is fed by snow. Above Seleznikha Maly Irgiz dries up systematically (up to 305 days per year without drainage). Between November and April the Maly Irgiz is frozen.
