= List of chairmen of the Legislative Assembly of Penza Oblast =

The chairman of the Legislative Assembly of Penza Oblast is the presiding officer of that legislature.

== Office-holders ==
Name	Took office	Left office
Yury Vechkasov	1994	2002
Viktor Lazutkin	April 2002	December 2003
Viktor Cherushov	December 2003	December 2007
Aleksandr Gulyakov	December 14, 2012	Present

== Sources ==
- The Legislative Assembly of Penza Oblast
