= Khvalynsk =

Town in Saratov Oblast, Russia

Khvalynsk Хвалынск
- Town
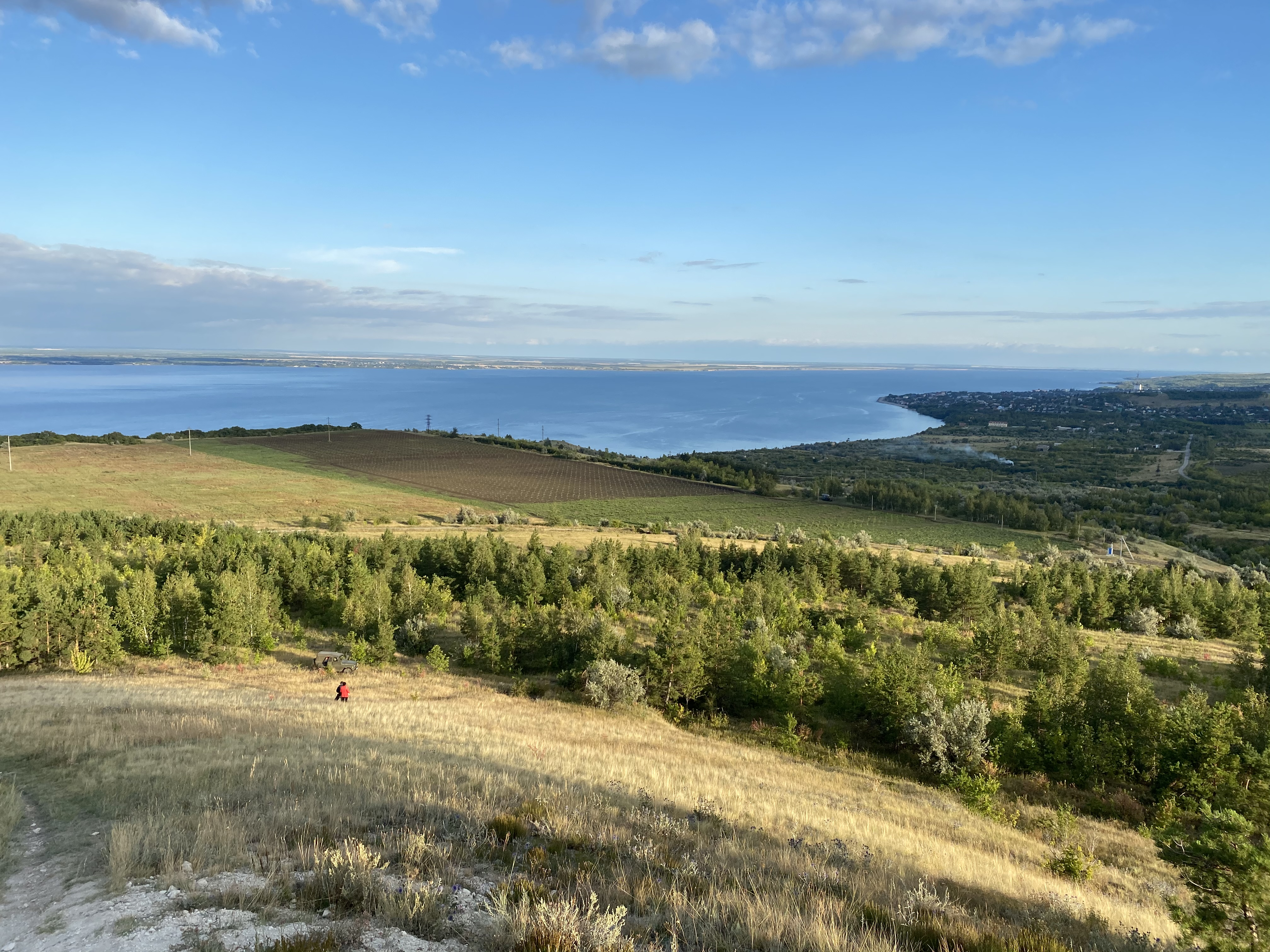
- View of the town from the Khvalynsk Hills

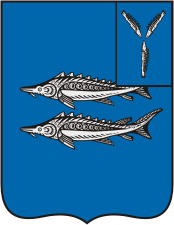
- Coat of arms
- Interactive map of Khvalynsk
- Location of Khvalynsk Khvalynsk (Saratov Oblast)
- Coordinates: 52°29′N 48°06′E
- Country: Russia
- Federal subject: Saratov Oblast
- Founded: 1556
- Town status since: 1780
- Elevation: 50 m (160 ft)

Population (2010 Census)
  - Total: 13,094
  - Estimate (2021): 12,042 (−8%)

Administrative status
  - Subordinated to: Khvalynsk Town Under Oblast Jurisdiction
  - Capital of: Khvalynsky District, Khvalynsk Town Under Oblast Jurisdiction

Municipal status
  - Municipal district: Khvalynsky Municipal District
  - Urban settlement: Khvalynsk Urban Settlement
  - Capital of: Khvalynsky Municipal District, Khvalynsk Urban Settlement
- Time zone: UTC+4 (MSK+1)
- Postal code: 412780–412787
- Dialing code: +7 84595
- OKTMO ID: 63649101001

Khvalynsk (Note: /xvʌˈlɪnsk, kvʌ-/; Russian: Хвалы́нск, IPA: [xvɐˈlɨnsk]) is a river port town in Saratov Oblast, Russia, located by the Volga River. Population: 13,094 (2010 census); 13,752 (2002 census); 14,948 (1989 Soviet census); 16,000 (1974). It is located on the right bank of the Volga, at the foot of the Khvalynsk Mountains, 180 kilometers (110 mi) northeast of Saratov and 160 kilometers (99 mi) southwest of Samara.

The place name stems from the old Russian name of the Caspian Sea: Хвалынское море, or "Khvalyn Sea". The latter is derived from the name "Khwalis" for the inhabitants of Khwarezm. The town is the namesake of the Khvalynsk Hills and Khvalynsk culture.

== History ==
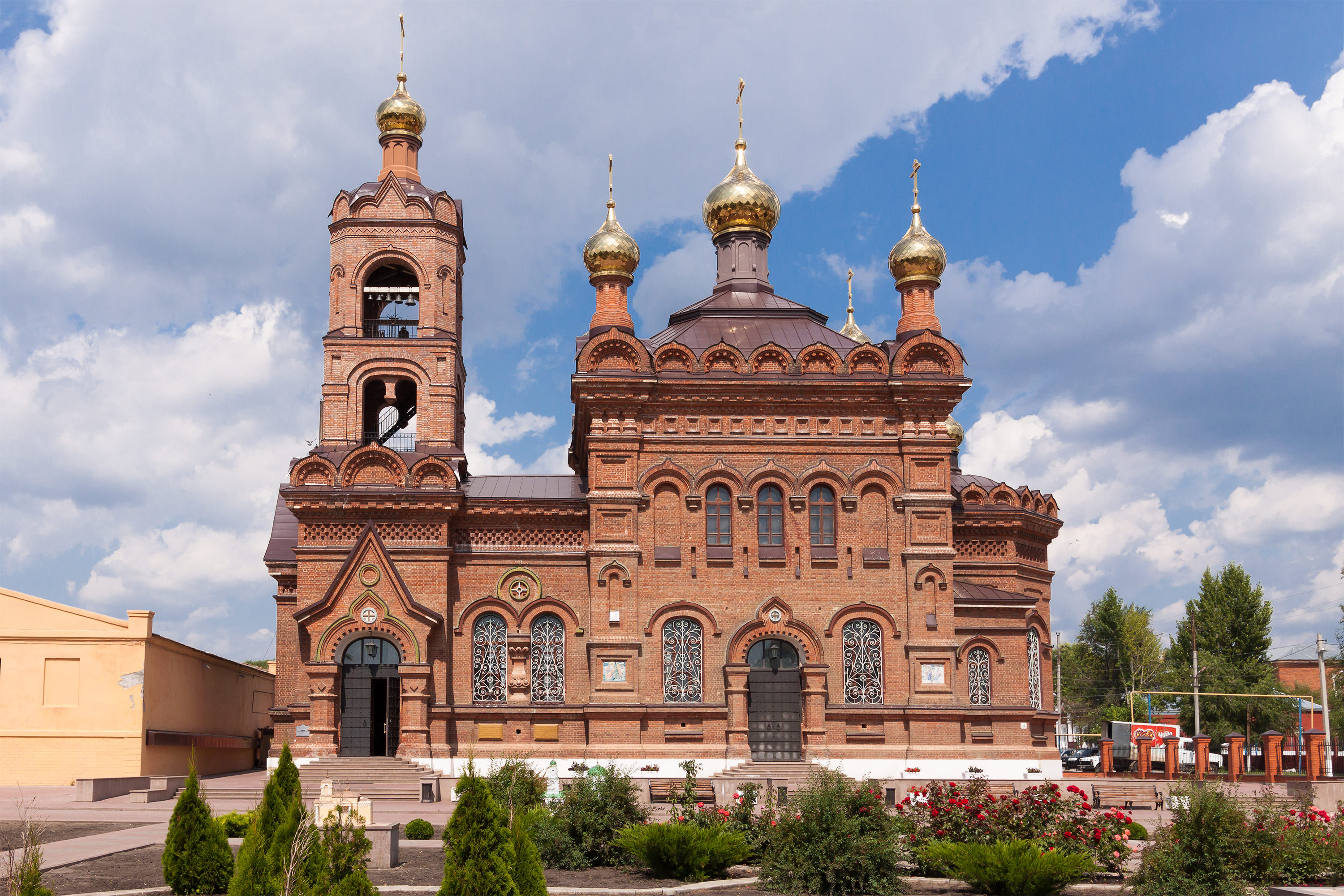
An Orthodox church dedicated to the Feast of the Cross

It was founded in 1556 as a Russian outpost on the Sosnovy Island on the Volga. In 1606, the whole settlement was relocated to the spot of today's Khvalynsk and came to be known as Sosnovy Ostrov (Сосновый Остров, lit. pine island). In 1780, the settlement was granted uyezd town status and renamed Khvalynsk.

In the 18th–19th centuries, Khvalynsk was known as a local center for trading bread and agricultural produce. It was also one of the centers of the Old Believers. Some scholars believe that Khvalynsk was used by Nikolai Gogol as a setting for his play The Government Inspector.

== Administrative and municipal status ==
Within the framework of administrative divisions, Khvalynsk serves as the administrative center of Khvalynsky District, even though it is not a part of it. As an administrative division, it is, together with four rural localities, incorporated separately as Khvalynsk Town Under Oblast Jurisdiction—an administrative unit with the status equal to that of the districts. As a municipal division, Khvalynsk Town Under Oblast Jurisdiction, together with two rural localities in Khvalynsky District, is incorporated within Khvalynsky Municipal District as Khvalynsk Urban Settlement.

== Notable people and culture ==
Khvalynsk is the birthplace of the artist Kuzma Petrov-Vodkin, whose museum was established in the town in 1995.
