= Saratov Reservoir =

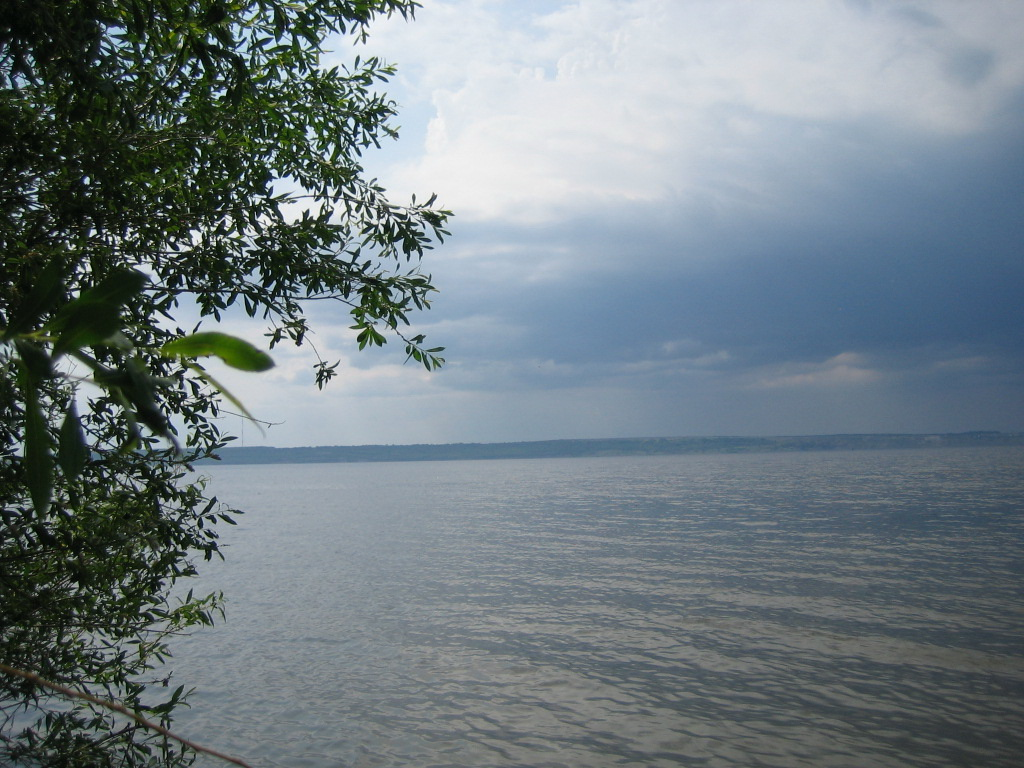

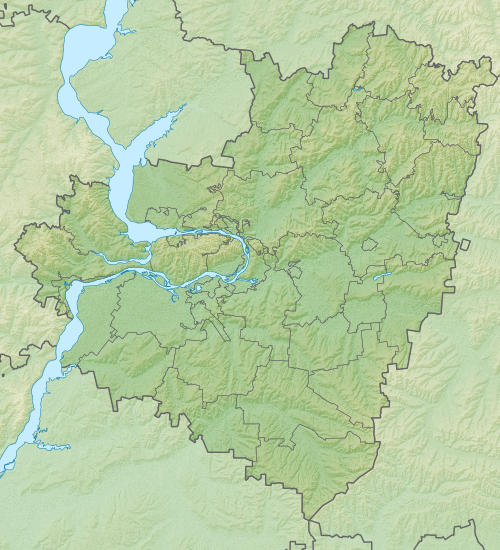
- Location within Samara Oblast
- Coordinates: 52°50′N 48°30′E
- Type: Hydroelectric reservoir
- Primary inflows: Volga, Samara
- Basin countries: Russia
- Max. length: 357 km (222 mi)
- Max. width: 25 km (16 mi)
- Surface area: 1,831 km^{2} (707 sq mi)
- Average depth: 7 m (23 ft)
- Settlements: Samara, Syzran, Balakovo

Saratov Reservoir (Russian: Саратовское водохрани́лище) is an artificial lake in the lower part of the Volga River in Russia. It was formed by the dam of the Saratov Hydroelectric Station situated in the city of Balakovo. Filling of the reservoir started in 1967 and finished the year after. The uppermost point of the reservoir is situated in Tolyatti, it stretches through Samara and Saratov oblasts. The city of Samara and the Volga's Samara Bend are situated on the reservoir. The namesake city of Saratov is situated downstream from the dam.
