= Khvalynsk Hills =

Hills in Russia

- Хвалынские горы
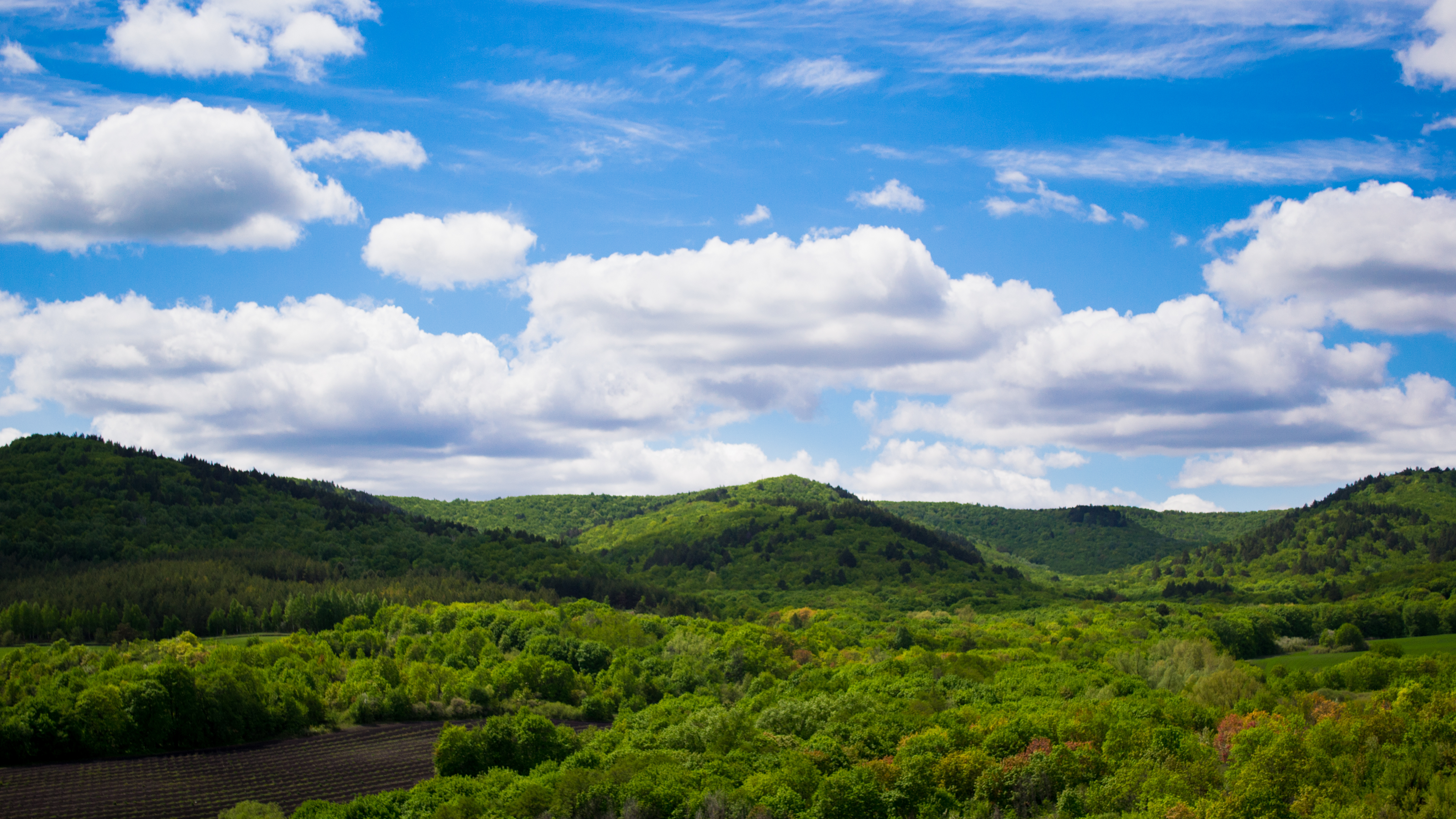
- Panorama of the Khvalynsk Mountains.

Highest point
- Peak: Unnamed
- Elevation: 369 m (1,211 ft)

Geography
- Location within European Russia Location within Russia
- Location: Saratov Oblast, Penza Oblast, Russia
- Range coordinates: 52°29′N 48°01′E
- Parent range: Volga Uplands

Geology
- Rock age: Cretaceous

Climbing
- Easiest route: From Khvalynsk

Khvalynsk Hills (Russian: Хвалынские горы) is a hilly region in Saratov Oblast and Penza Oblast, Russia.

A 25,524 hectares (63,070 acres) section of the hills is a protected area under the name Khvalynsky National Park, which was established in 1994.

== Geography ==
The Khvalynsk Mountains are a group of smooth hills in the East European Plain, extending on the right bank of the Volga. They are one of the highest of the subranges of the Volga Uplands. They are mostly located in the Saratov Oblast, with a small part in southeastern Penza Oblast. The hill zone is sparsely populated. Villages such as Piksankino (Пиксанкино), Novaya Yaksarka (Новая Яксарка), Staraya Yaksarka (Старая Яксарка), Novy Machim (Новый Мачим), Russkaya Norka (Русская Норка), Mordovskaya Norka (Мордовская Норка), Rango Lisma (Ранго-Лисьма), Vilyayevka (Виляевка), Ivanovka (Ивановка —Шемышейский район), Yango-Prya (Янго-Пря), Ust-Murza (Усть-Мурза), Vorobyovka (Воробьёвка —Шемышейский район), Azrapino (Азрапино —Пензенская область), Naumkino (Наумкино —Пензенская область), Dubrovka-on-Uze (Дубровка-на-Узе), Staroye Zakharkino (Старое Захаркино), Staroye Demkino (Старое Демкино), Ust-Uza (Усть-Уза), Peschanka (Песчанка —Шемышейский район), Aleksandro-Bogdanovka (Александро-Богдановка), Koldais (Колдаис), Neklyudovo (Неклюдово —Пензенская область), Karzhimant (Каржимант), Arapino (Арапино) and Neverkino are scattered throughout the hill area, but cities are only located in the periphery.

The highest point of Saratov Oblast, reaching 369 metres (1,211 ft), as well as the highest point of Penza Oblast, reaching 342 metres (1,122 ft) above sea level, are located in the Khvalinsk Hills. Both summits are unnamed. There are also white chalk hills among pine forests that are a tourist attraction.

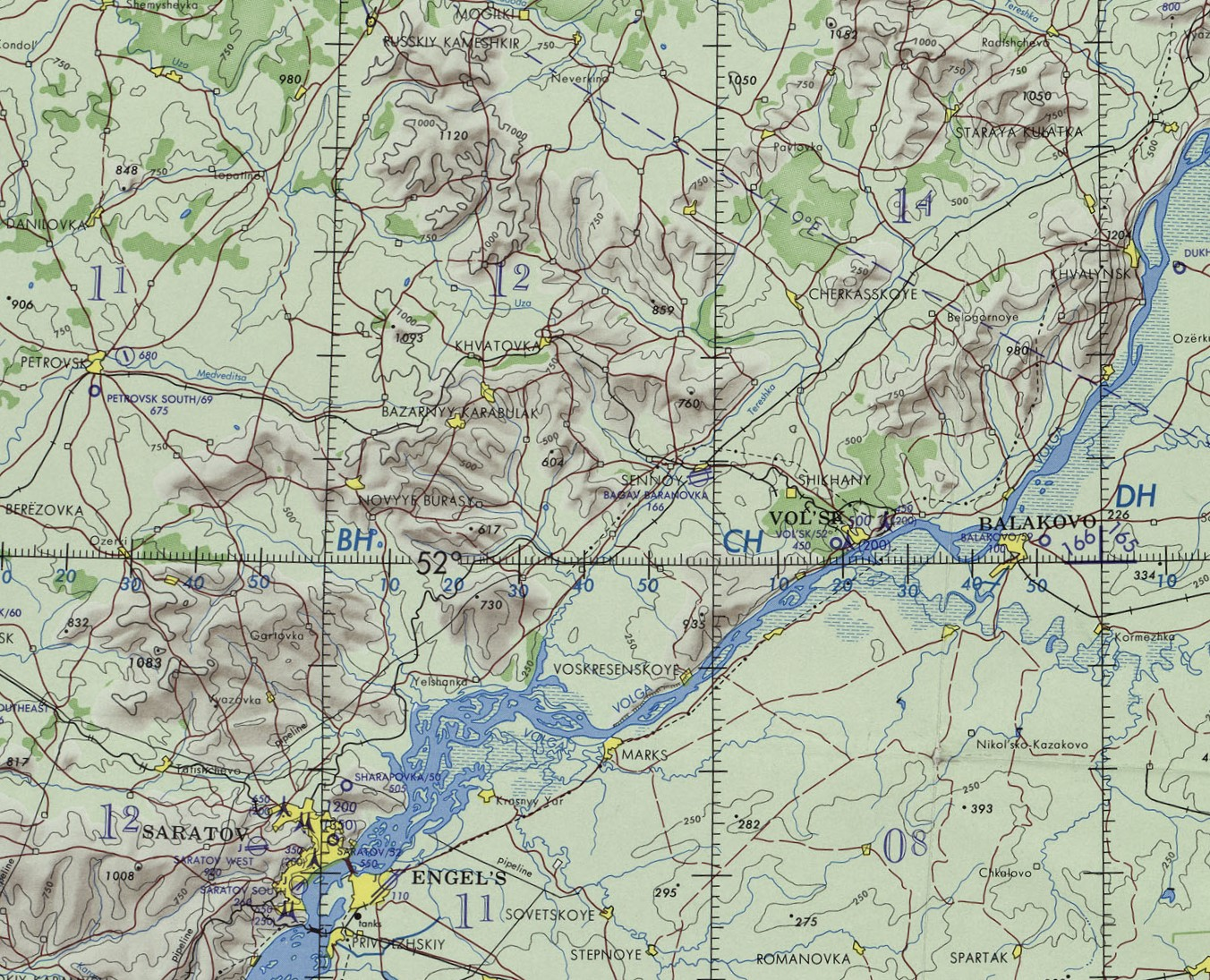
ONC map section of the area.

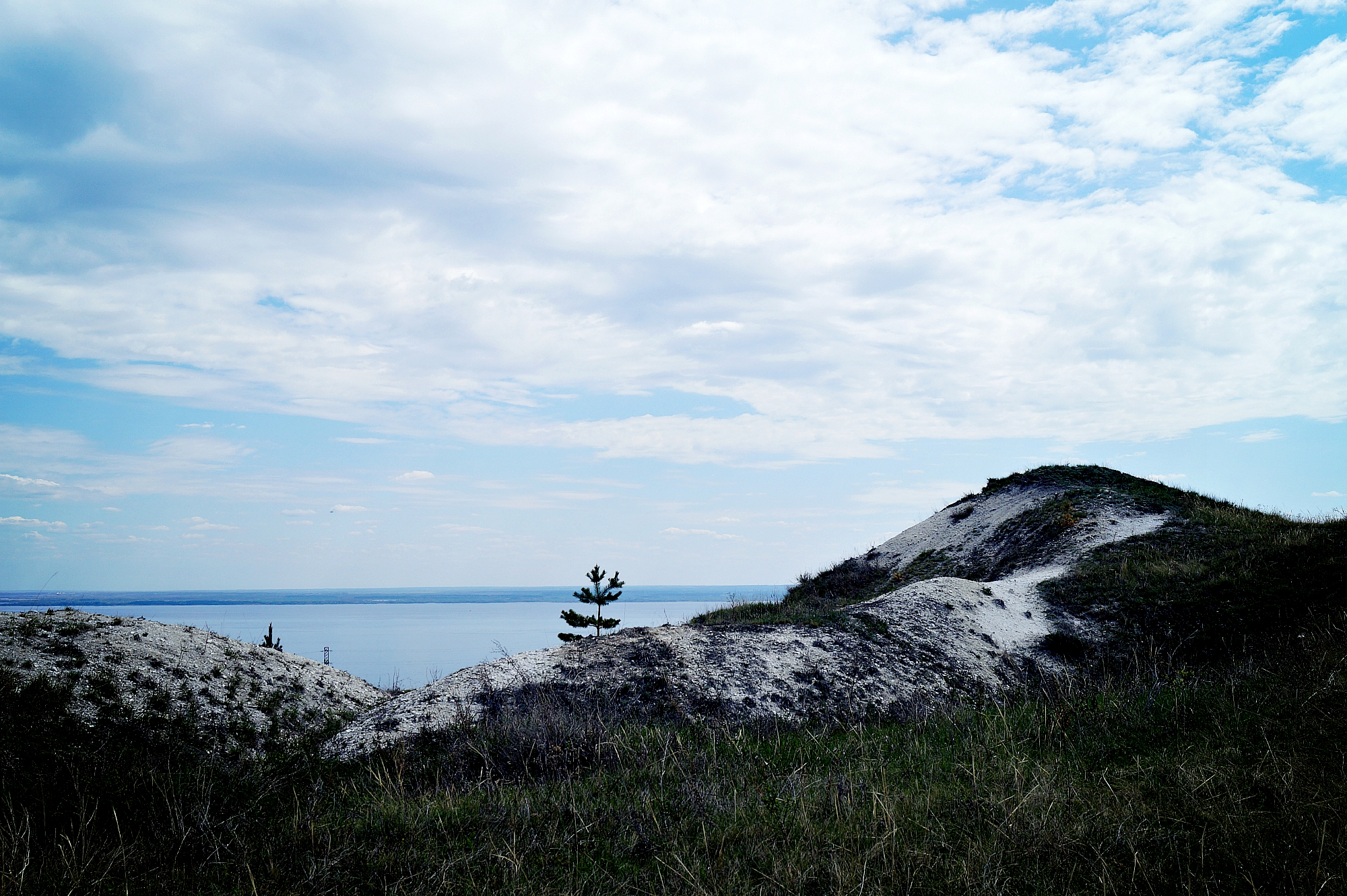
View of the mountains with the Volga in the background.

== See also ==
- Highest points of Russian Federal subjects
- List of mountains and hills of Russia
