= Arsiyah =

Middle Ages Muslim mercenary group

Arsiyah (other forms of the word include - Lariçiyeh, al-Larisiya) was the name used for a group of Muslim mercenaries in the service of the Khazar Khaganate. Whether the Arsiyah were a single tribe or composed of Muslims from a number of different tribes is unclear. They were primarily immigrants from the vicinity of Khwarazm who resettled in Khazaria. According to the Arab historian Al-Masudi, they moved to the territory of the Khazar king in ancient times following the outbreak of war and plague (or drought and famine) in their own land after the emergence of Islam.

== Origins and etymology ==
The origin of the Arsiyah is a subject of debate among historians. While Al-Masudi explicitly describes them as migrants from Khwarazm, modern scholars have proposed links to other Iranian-speaking groups:

- Alanic connection: Some researchers have pointed to the linguistic similarity between "Ars" and "As", the Turkic term for the Alans.
- Aorsi connection: Other scholars derive the name from the ancient Aorsi or the Iranian Auruša (white). However, critics argue that while the Arsiyah may have been related to the As/Alans, they constituted a distinct ethnic group that had resided in the Khwarazm region prior to their migration. Vladimir Minorsky suggested that the title of the Khazar commander Ras Tarkhan might be a variation of "Ars-Tarkhan".

According to Arabic text with French translation "Les Prairies d'or" translated by Charles Barbier de Meynard and Abel Pavet de Courteille, the word reads from Arabic as lariçiyeh. Which, according to the "Book of the Huns" by Alexandre Vincent, is translated from the Khazar language as guards.

== Status and privileges ==
According to Muslim sources, particularly Al-Masudi, the Arsiyah formed the core of the Khazar army and were extremely influential in Khazar politics. They served under a specific treaty with the Khazar king that granted them extensive rights:

- They were permitted to openly practice Islam, maintain mosques, and perform the call to prayer (adhan).
- They had the right to be judged by their own Muslim judges (qadis).
- The position of the king's vizier was hereditary and reserved for the Arsiyah leaders.
- A clause in their contract guaranteed they would not be forced to fight against fellow Muslims; in such wars, they stood apart from the main army, though they fought alongside the Khazars against other "infidels".

== Military history ==
The Arsiyah were the main part of the only permanent, paid standing army in the region, consisting of approximately 7,000 heavy cavalry. They were equipped with bows, cuirasses, helmets, and chainmail, and included spearmen armed in the Muslim fashion.

Some historians suggest the Khazar Bek recruited the Arsiyah during the 9th century to secure a loyal force during the civil wars that followed the Khazar elite's conversion to Judaism. Their presence may also have been a countermeasure against the Hungarians, who appeared on the Khazar western frontier around 836.

=== Campaign of 913 ===
In 913, a Varangian fleet was granted passage to the Caspian Sea by the Khazar government in exchange for a share of their plunder. After the Rus raided the Muslim lands of Gilan, Tabaristan, and Shirvan, the Arsiyah demanded the right to retaliate for the slaughter of their co-religionists. Although the Khazar king warned the Rus, he could not restrain his guard. A force of 15,000, comprising the Arsiyah and Christians from the capital Atil, ambushed the Rus at the Volga estuary. The battle lasted three days and resulted in the destruction of the Rus forces, with Al-Masudi reporting 30,000 dead.

== Connection to Kyiv ==
During the 10th century, the Arsiyah vizier was named Ahmad ibn Kuya. Historian Omeljan Pritsak hypothesized that the name of his father, Kuya, is linguistically linked to the name of Kyiv (via the form *Kujaba). Pritsak suggested that Kuya, as the Khazar minister of war, may have founded or fortified the fortress at Kyiv in the 9th century to secure the western frontier.

This theory is strongly contested by Ukrainian archaeologists such as Petro Tolochko, who argue that the archaeological layers of early Kyiv are thoroughly Slavic and lack the Saltovo-Mayaki (Khazar) material culture that would be expected if the city were founded by a Khazar vizier.

== Sources ==
- Brook, Kevin Alan (2006). The Jews of Khazaria (2nd ed.). Rowman & Littlefield Publishers, Inc.
- Bubenok, O. B.; Radivilov, D. A. (2004). "Народ ал-арсийа в Хазарии (из истории хазаро-хорезмских связей)" [The Al-Arsiyah People in Khazaria (From the History of Khazar-Khwarazmian Relations)] (PDF). Khazarskii almanakh (in Russian). 2. Moscow: 5–18.
- Dunlop, Douglas M. (1954). The History of the Jewish Khazars. Princeton, N.J.: Princeton University Press.
- Golb, Norman; Pritsak, Omeljan (1982). Khazarian Hebrew Documents of the Tenth Century. Ithaca: Cornell University Press.
- Golden, Peter B. (2007). "The Conversion of the Khazars to Judaism". The World of the Khazars: New Perspectives. Leiden: Brill.
- Vincent, Alexandre (2016). «Book of the Huns» - Part I. Bibliothèque nationale de France. ISBN 978-2-9577687-0-7.
