= Edinoverie =

Interfaith agreement in Russia

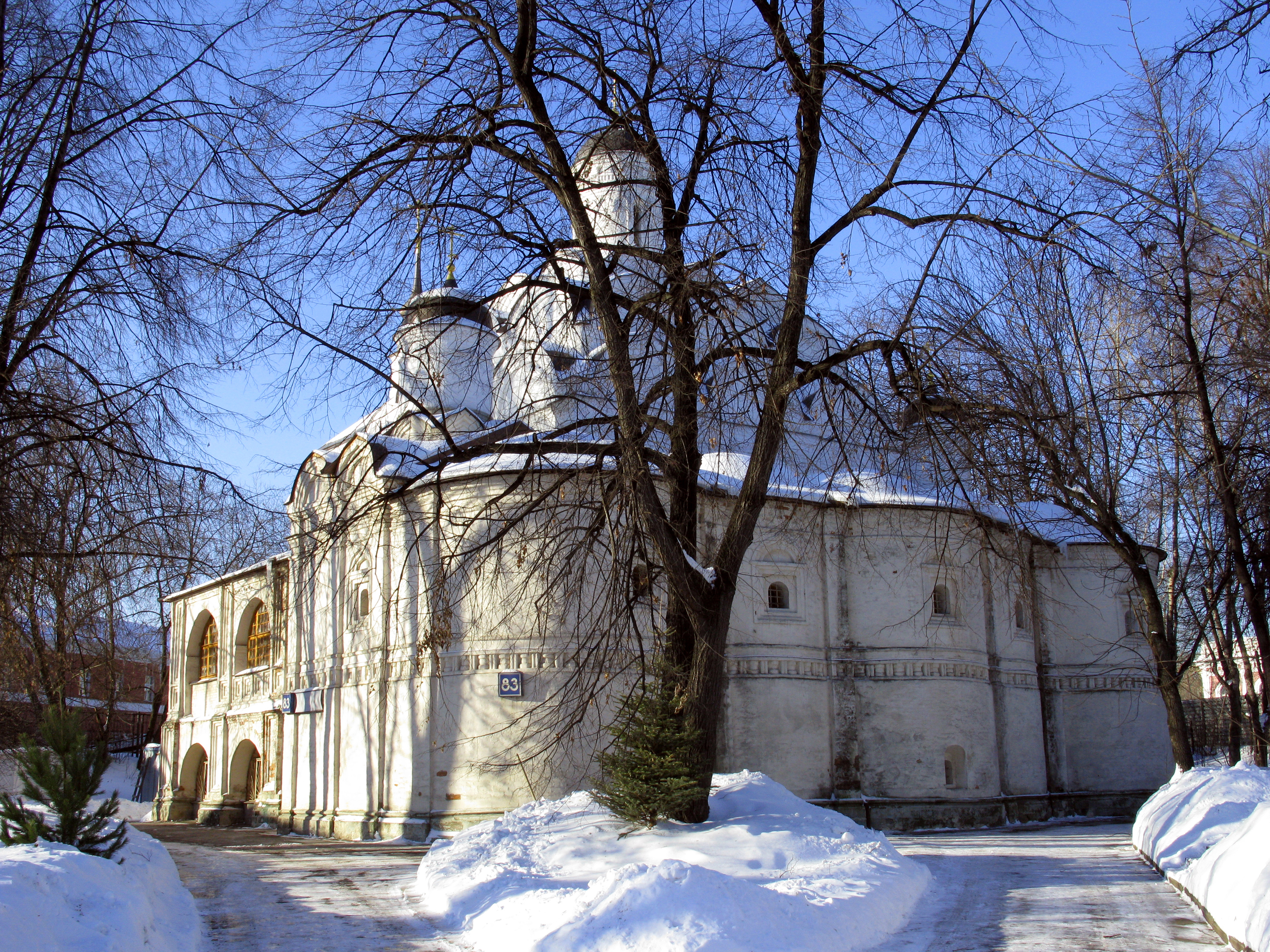
Church of the Protection of the Theotokos in Rubtsovo in Moscow, seat of the Patriarchal Centre of the Old Russian Liturgical Tradition.

Edinoverie (Russian: единове́рие, IPA: [jɪdʲɪnɐˈvʲerʲɪjɪ]) is an arrangement between certain Russian Old Believers communities and the official Russian Orthodox Church, whereby such communities are treated as a part of the normative Church system while maintaining their own rites. Thus, they are often designated "Old Ritualists" (Russian: старообря́дцы, staroobryadtsy), as opposed to "Old Believers". The followers of this movement preserve the ancient liturgical rites (like two-finger blessing, services according to pre-reform printed books, etc.) and the old Russian way of life, recognise the hierarchical jurisdiction of the Moscow Patriarchate. In the definition of Bishop Simon (Shleev): "Edinoverie is Old Belief reconciled with the Russian and Universal Church".

It emerged in the 18th century and was, on the one hand, an expression of the desire of some adherents of the "old faith" to unite with the Russian Orthodox Church due to the absence of a church hierarchy among the Old Believers and, on the other hand, arose in connection with the government's recognition of the ineffectiveness of forceful methods of "suppressing the schism", which provoked the Old Believers into resistance. It was sanctioned by the highest church authority in the 1780s and regulated in 1800 by Metropolitan Platon (Levshin). At the same time, requests for the appointment of a special bishop for Edinoverie adherents and for the lifting of the "anathemas" of the Councils of 1656 and 1667 against the old rites were not met. Edinoverie was from the outset regarded with suspicion both by the majority of Old Believers, who viewed Edinoverie adherents as traitors and compared Edinoverie to a unia, and by most of the clergy of the state church, who saw them as "half-schismatics" and secret Old Believers. Despite restrictions on their rights, by 1918 approximately 600 Edinoverie parishes and more than ten monasteries were operating on the territory of the Russian Empire. At the All-Russian Local Council of 1917–1918, the question of appointing Edinoverie bishops was resolved affirmatively. The "anathemas" against the old rites were lifted only at the Local Council of the Russian Orthodox Church in 1971. In the Soviet era, due to the total persecution of the Church and the old way of life in general, Edinoverie virtually disappeared. Since the late 1980s, the old rite within the Russian Orthodox Church has experienced a second birth. At the same time, "among the main features of the contemporary situation of the Old Rite parishes of the Russian Orthodox Church one may note the absence of an official ecclesiastical-canonical status that would define the structure of their liturgical and communal life" Only on March 24, 2022, did the Synod approve the "Statute on the Old Rite Parishes of the Russian Orthodox Church".

== Terms and meanings ==
In the pre-revolutionary period, in addition to the term Edinoverie ("Unity in Faith"), several other terms were also used. In the 1780s, Old Believers who sought reconciliation with the official Church while preserving their own rituals, books, and traditions began to be called soglasniki (literally "those in agreement"), and their movement was known as soglasnichestvo ("conciliation [movement]"). In the 1790s, another term appeared — soyedinentsy ("those who joined [the Church]"), and this tendency was referred to as soyedinenstvo ("reunion" or "unification").

In 1800, Metropolitan Platon Levshin introduced a new concept, calling the Old Believers, supporters of the join, as edinovertsy (co-religionists, ones of the same faith): "those who accepted and agreed and received the Church on the above-mentioned basis should no longer be called schismatics or old-ritualists, because there is nothing new in the Church and there are no new-ritualists, to call them soyedinentsy or edinovertsy, to which names they, according to my suggestion, declare themselves agreeable...", and therefore their Church should be called Edinoverie"). More open-minded hierarchs of the State Church saw in the Edinoverie a mutual acceptance. In the words of Metropolitan Philaret Drozdov of Moscow, addressed to the Edinovertsy at the 1854 consecration of Saint Nicholas Church for them at Rogozhskoye Cemetery: "You are people of our faith, and we are people of your faith".

After the First All-Russian Congress of Co-Religionists, held in October 1912 in St. Petersburg, another name for this church movement became widespread – Orthodox Old Believers.

== History ==
=== Old rites before 1800 ===
The reforms of Patriarch Nikon did not become established immediately. Although in Moscow, under Nikon, services were already conducted according to the new rite, in the provinces many bishops who had signed the conciliar decrees in favour of the reforms along with Nikon quietly sabotaged their own decisions so as not to provoke unrest among their flocks. In the provinces, services were mostly conducted according to the old rite. Intermediate forms were also common. Even after the anathemas of the Moscow Council of 1656 and the Grand Moscow Council of 1666–1667, according to whose decisions those who practiced the two-fingers blessing were declared heretics, cases of the coexistence of the old and new rites within the ruling Church still occurred. Pyotr Chubarov noted: "It is known that even in the second half of the 17th century in many places in actual liturgical practice, especially on the periphery, old and new books and rites coexisted. Many believers attended ordinary Orthodox parishes but kept to the two-fingered sign and old rites". Such tendencies, as the researcher notes, were extremely persistent. The fact that at the beginning of the 18th century there were people who permitted the old rite in the official church is attested by the decree of the Holy Synod of February 28, 1722, which required the elimination of the mixing of old and new rites: "Those who, although they submit to the Church and receive all the church sacraments, yet make the sign of the cross with two fingers… shall be recorded as schismatics, regardless of anything". Nevertheless, in the mid-18th century Bishop Hilarion of Astrakhan (1731–1755) permitted clergy in his diocese, due to the large number of Old Believers living in the region, to conduct services according to pre-reform books. According to documents of the Astrakhan Spiritual Consistory, the Terek Cossacks "remained almost until the mid-18th century in unity with the Orthodox Church and in submission to the Bishop of Astrakhan, while at the same time maintaining, together with their priests, not only privately but also ecclesiastically, the old rites according to old printed books". An analogous situation until the 1780s also existed among the Yaik (Ural) Cossacks, who maintained old rites and orders in their churches while remaining under the jurisdiction of the Metropolitan of Kazan. A known conflict arose between the host and the Metropolitan of Kazan Luka (Konashevich), during which the Cossacks gave written responses to the bishop, indicating that the books in the Mikhail-Archangel Cathedral were old printed ones. Luka was compelled to ordain the Cossack Maxim Pavlov, who crossed himself with two fingers, as a protopope for the host, and to abandon the establishment of a spiritual administration in Yaik Gorodok. Nevertheless, these were for the most part isolated actions by individual bishops that had no effect on the overall situation.

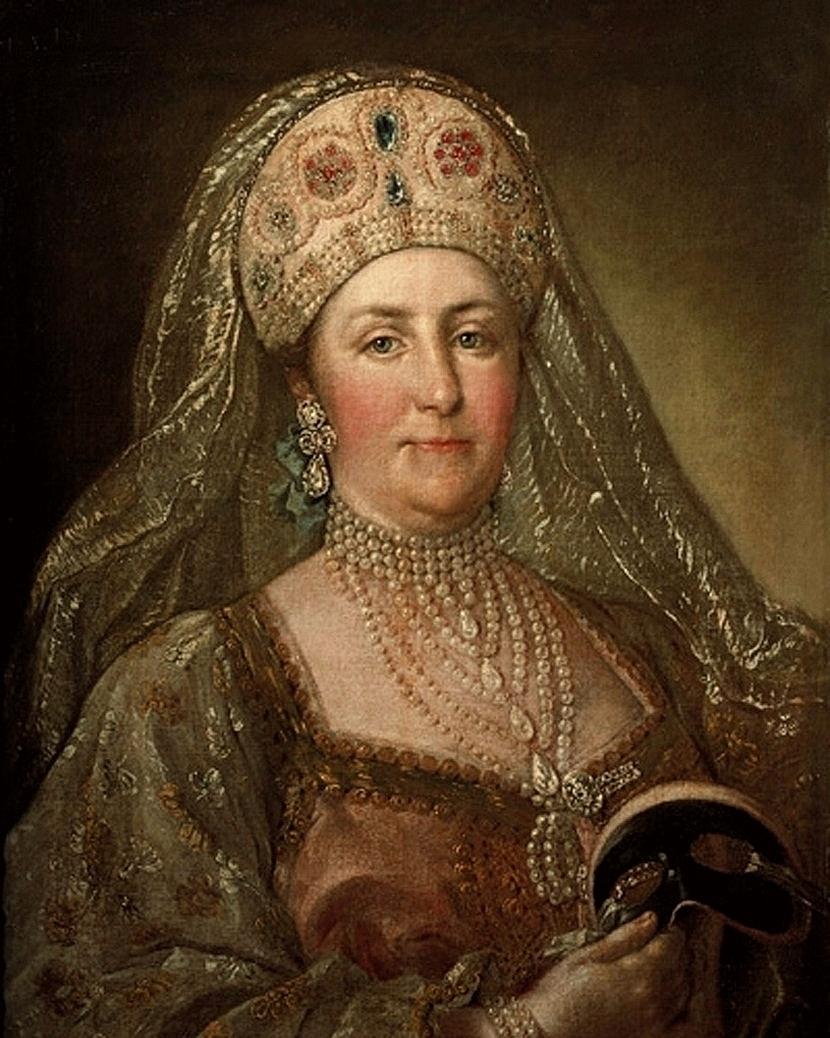
Catherine II in Russian Costume. Late 18th century

The union of Old Believers with the Orthodox Church issue was raised during the reign of Catherine II. In 1762, Metropolitan of Novgorod Dimitry (Sechenov) and Bishop of Pskov Gedeon (Krinovsky) admitted the possibility of leaving the old rites to the "schismatics". To support this idea they put forward the following arguments: "first, it is desirable in the Church to have full agreement of its members in all questions, not only in faith but also in rites; second, … with unity of faith it may be … permitted in the Church, out of condescension to the conscience of the weak, the use of various rites, provided they have an orthodox signification; third, the permission for Old Believers to use the so-called old rites cannot be at variance with the anathema of the Council of 1667, because it was pronounced 'not against rites and not because of rites.' And fourth, the use of old rites by those devoted to them can be salvific only in union with the Church: receiving permission to use their rites, such persons are obliged 'in all else' to be of one mind with the Orthodox Church — not only with regard to its hierarchy, accepting it, but also with regard to rites, 'by no means reproaching them.'" In 1763, the Procurator-General of the Holy Synod Ivan Melissino addressed Catherine II with a similar idea. In his document Proposals Concerning the Schismatics, he wrote that the Old Believers not only desire to draw closer to Orthodoxy, but assert that they have not deviated from it, that all their distinction consists only in church rites, which they perform, as they say, according to ancient custom. Melissino further remarked that the Old Believers' conditions could be accepted if they were to be loyal subjects, if they undertook nothing contrary to religion or civil laws. Their rites could be permitted, "those not contrary to Orthodoxy, as well as the old books," they could be allowed to build churches and given priests who would serve "according to agreed rites" and report monthly to the bishop on the conduct of the "schismatics of each parish… in addition to the above-mentioned indulgence one could also do the following: no longer call them schismatics, but replace this name with another more fitting to them, such as dvoidantsy; they would no longer have the anathema proclaimed against them". A sign of tolerance towards the old rites was also the statement of the joint Conference of the Synod and the Senate of September 15, 1763, that "the custom of crossing oneself with two fingers is not proof of belonging to the schism and should not be prohibited". In 1766, Archimandrite Platon (Levshin), the future Metropolitan of Moscow, published the book Exhortation for the Confirmation of Truth), written at the initiative of Catherine II. Unlike previous "anti-schismatic" writings, most of which were sharply accusatory in character, this book states that the "schismatics" and the Orthodox "are agreed in the faith itself… and quarrel only over trifles," and further that "it is better to tolerate a change of church customs than to lose love and union with the Church". In March 1769, a decree of the Holy Synod On the Distribution throughout Churches and Monasteries in All Dioceses of Copies of the Booklet 'Exhortation to Schismatics,' with a Supplement on the Procedure to Be Followed in Their Reception into the Orthodox Church was released. Although given everything that Metropolitan Platon subsequently wrote about Old Belief, this composition should be considered "a fairly opportunistic work, written in the spirit of Catherine II's approach to the Old Believer problem," it was precisely this work that became the starting point for the future founders of Edinoverie.

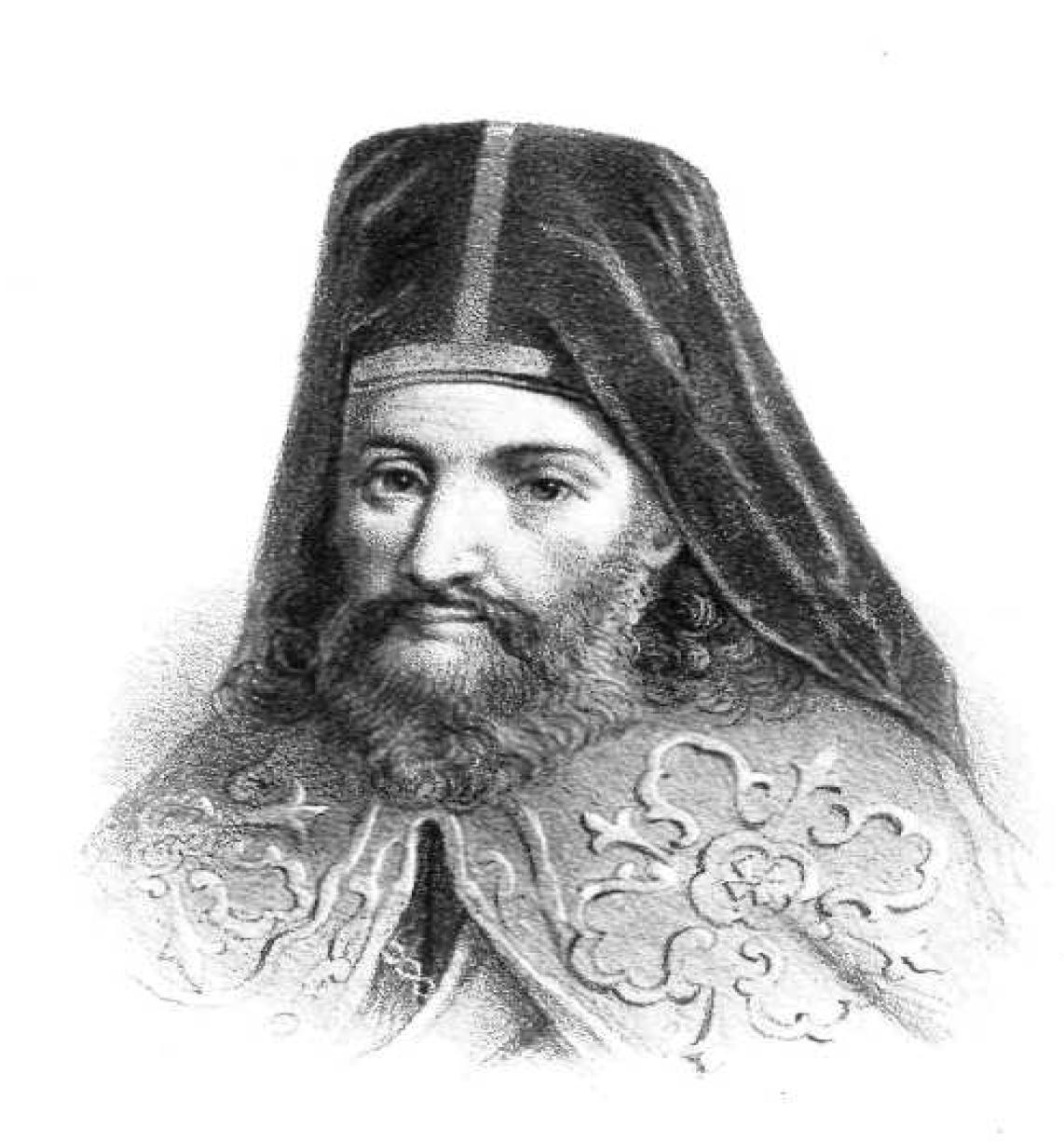
Archbishop Nikiphoros (Theotokis)

The first to put the principle of Edinoverie into practice were Old Believers of the popovtsy agreement from the village of Znamenka in Yelisavetgrad Uyezd (now Znamenka Vtoraya in Kirovograd region): in 1799 or 1780, they requested Bishop Nikiphoros (Theotokis) to allow them to build a church, have a priest from among themselves, and use the ancient books, on condition of their recognising the Greek Church as true, universal, catholic, and apostolic. Bishop Nikiphoros recognised it as possible to fulfil. The reception of the Old Believers of the village of Znamenka was performed according to the established rite by a representative specially sent by Nikiphoros for this purpose. The church was founded on May 3, 1780, and consecrated on June 16. Archbishop Nikiphoros himself consecrated the church and celebrated the first liturgy in it. For the newly consecrated church and the parish formed around it, Archbishop Nikiphoros appointed one of the Orthodox priests, to whom he gave "his blessing to conduct services according to the old printed books" and to use old rites. On the sheet with the Old Believers' petition, Nikiphoros inscribed an archpastoral directive: "That henceforth no Orthodox Christian should dare to call or regard them [those received] as schismatics, but that all should regard and name them as true Christian believers, as we ourselves are". However, the attitude of the clergy to such actions was ambiguous. Archbishop Nikiphoros was confident that his instructions would be confirmed by the Synod, but his expectations were not fulfilled. The Synod met Nikiphoros's instructions with perplexity and, fearing Old Believer unrest, did not cancel them. To justify his actions, Archbishop Nikiphoros wrote A Narrative of the Conversion of the Old Believers of the Village of Znamenka. Archbishop (later Metropolitan) of Novgorod Gavriil (Petrov) and the Holy Synod evaluated Nikiphoros's arguments, and this contributed to the fact that the "affair of the establishment of Edinoverie in Starodubye and other places" that followed met with no objections from the Holy Synod but, on the contrary, "found approval and support". However, Metropolitan Platon (Levshin) expressed himself very sharply against such "condescension". He strove for all Old Believers who joined the Church to adopt the generally accepted rite, and feared lest "the greater part of those who had come to our Church abandon it and join their gang: the ignorant are closer to the ignorant". But Nikiphoros Theotokis appealed to another work by the same Metropolitan Platon – the Exhortation for the Confirmation of Truth of 1776 – where it was stated: "…the Orthodox Church, although it defends, as it should, the new books, does not at all reproach the old ones, nor does it command — it does not even advise — refraining from their use". It was precisely this assertion that later served as the basis for subsequent petitions by Old Believers "for permission to use old printed books in their liturgical practice". Archbishop Nikiphoros thus became not only the founder of the future Edinoverie, but also its first defender.

=== Establishment of Edinoverie ===
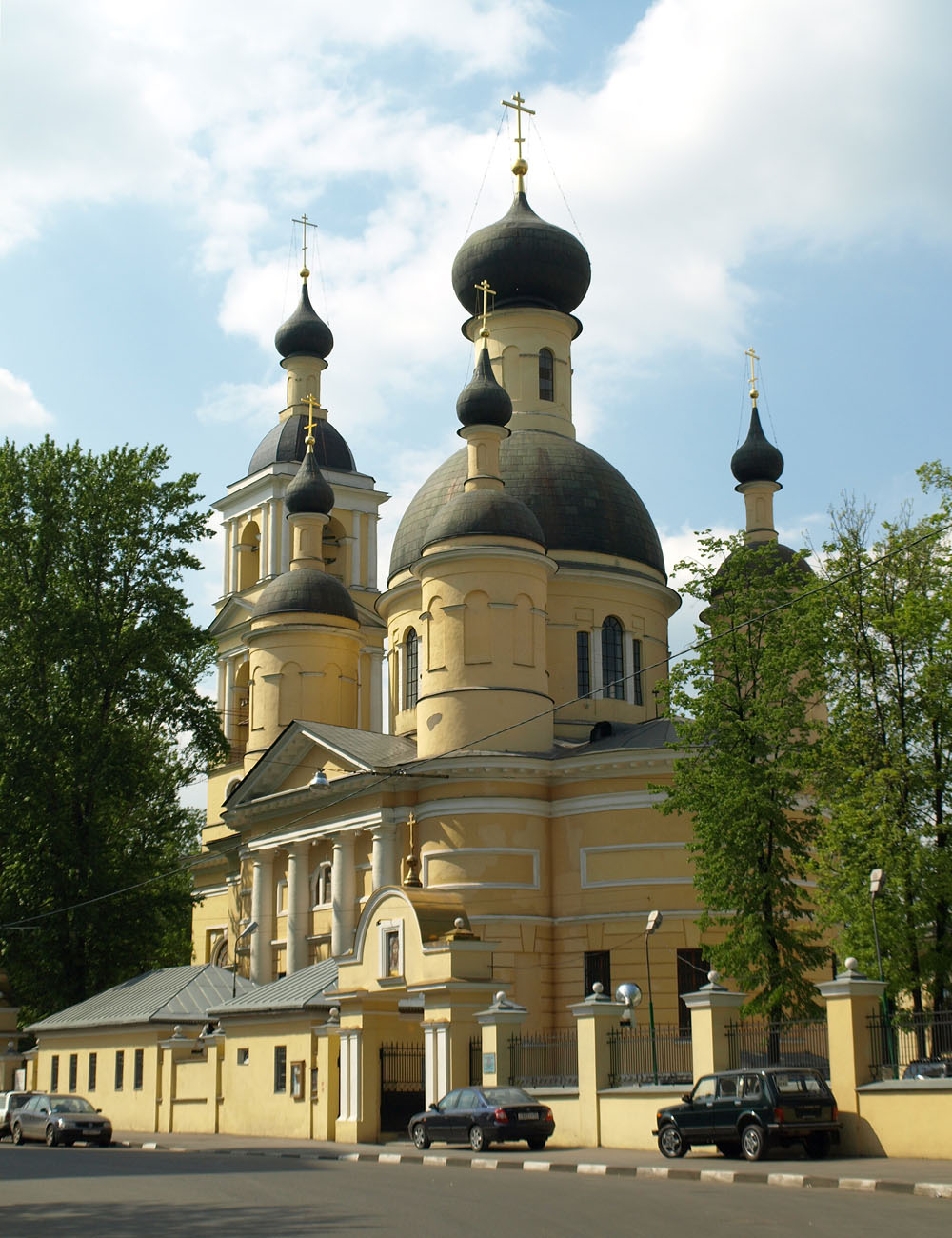
Church of Presentation of Mary in Lefortovo (1819), formerly of the Moscow's Edinoverie community

Edinoverie arrangements began to appear in the last quarter of the 18th century, after more than a century of struggle between Russia's established Orthodox Church and various Old Believer groups, who did not recognise the changes to liturgy and the official translations of Scripture made under the leadership of Patriarch Nikon in the 1660s.

On the side of the established church, Metropolitan Platon of Moscow (the senior hierarch of the Russian Orthodox Church) and Archbishop Nikephoros Theotokis are known as the initiators of Edinoverie. Nikephoros, when he began reaching out to Old Believers in 1780, was based in Poltava, the headquarters of what was then the Diocese of Sloviansk and Kherson, covering much of eastern Ukraine, and later to become the Diocese of Ekaterinoslav. When he visited a chapel of Popovtsy (Old Believers who had their own priests not recognised by the Church) in Elisavetgrad in July of that year, he offered them the possibility of giving their chapel official standing in the established Church, with a priest selected by the Old Believers themselves, and using the pre-Nikonian service books and rites. The offer was rejected by the Old Believers of Elisavetgrad, but later that month, many Old Believers in the village of Bolshaya Znamenka (in Melitopol uyezd) accepted a similar arrangement. In February 1781, an archbishop issued a letter, authorising them to set up a church legally and conduct services in accordance with traditional rites. That was done by consecrating as a church the wooden chapel that the Old Believers of Znamenka had built in 1776.

Nikifor's scheme of legalisation turned out to be so popular that soon enough not only did the Popovtsy begin to request legalisation, but also the Bespopovtsy (the priestless faction) began asking Nikifor to provide them with priests. One such Bezpopovtsy community was the village of Zlynka in 1782.

Outside of Ukraine, in the same year, the Old Believer merchants of Moscow and the Volga arranged similar legalization of the Upper-Isaac Skete (compound) in the Irgiz Rivers area of Saratov Governorate.

On the side of the Old Believers, the driving force of the Edinoverie compromise were Hieromonk Michael Kalmykov and the Monk Nikodim. Having learned of Nikifor's experiments in the South and the legalisation of the Irgiz community, Nikodim, with an agreement of many Popovtsy of the Starodub area, began to contact civil and ecclesiastical authorities with regards to the possibility of "legalising" the priests of the Popovtsy. After a number of rejections, he gained the support of Count Peter Rumyantsev-Zadunaisky in 1783. In the same year, his petition to Empress Catherine II of Russia was forwarded to the Holy Synod. In April 1784, by which time Kalmykov had died, the Empress issued a rescript, granting priests to Old Believers and allowing them to officiate according to the old rites, but not providing for any bishops. Disappointed, Nikodim fell sick and died at the age of 39.

The new inspirer of the ideas of the "newly blessed agreement" after the monk Nikodim was the protopope Andrei Ioannov, who had himself converted from Old Belief to Edinoverie; he became known as the author of the first work after the Search of Dimitry of Rostov – the Historical Account of the Schismatics, compiled on the basis of rare primary sources.

The attitude of the Holy Synod towards the old rites themselves when establishing Edinoverie parishes remained extremely negative; for example, Archbishop Nikiphoros Theotokis, who with the consent of Empress Catherine II consecrated the first Old Believer church on June 18, 1780, and was directly establishing the connection between the Old Believers and the Synod, wrote a Circular Epistle to the Old Believers in which he explained to them that not only did all their rites and ceremonies originate from the heretic Martin the Armenian, but all their subsequent teachers had been non-Orthodox persons: "Such were the teachers and instructors of your sect, the very mention of whom brings shame and disgrace, because they were Armenians and Jews, who, having found simpleton ancestors of yours, seduced them and, having led them away from the straight path, brought them into the pit of perdition, advising them to consider as virtues such deeds as were formerly performed by the impious pagans who burned their sons and daughters in honour of their gods". But since the Old Believers were ready for union and recognised the priesthood and sacraments performed by the new-rite clergy, the new-rite bishops were ready to receive the Old Believers out of condescension. That is, the old rites were at that point regarded by the Synodal Church not only as not equally honourable, but not even as Orthodox.

In August 1785, a government decree was promulgated, providing for the organization of "Old Believer" churches within the established Church, although they still were not to have their own bishops or any sort of organizational centre. Nevertheless, this point is usually considered the start of the Edinoverie scheme. From Starodubye the movement for Edinoverie began to spread widely across the country: in 1788, a parish appeared in Yelisavetgrad; in 1791 – in the Trinity sloboda on the Dniester River; in 1794 – in Perm; in 1797 – in Kazan; in 1798 – in the town of Alexandria in Irkutsk Governorate, in Tver, Torzhok, Tver Governorate, in Nizhny Novgorod, in Saint Petersburg, and finally in 1800 – in Moscow. From 1787 an Edinoverie monastery also operated some 30 versts from Kherson. The already existing Mikhail-Archangel Cathedral of Yaik Gorodok, and also the Kazan and Peter-and-Paul churches, were attached to Edinoverie. Thanks to a meeting with Bishop Nikiphoros (who had taken the Astrakhan see), the monk Sergiy, builder of the Irgiz, became an ardent champion of Edinoverie.

Catherine's successor, Paul I, was perhaps more interested than Catherine, in the matter of integrating the Old Believers into the established church on acceptable terms. Legal priests were granted to the Old Believers of Kazan in 1796 and to those of Nizhny Novgorod in 1797. On March 12, 1798, the Emperor issued a decree, requiring all bishops to ordain priests for the Old Believers (using the "old" rite of ordination, acceptable to the flock), and permitting construction of Old Ritualist churches. The chief bishop of the established church, Metropolitan Platon of Moscow, wrote in 1800, the Eleven Points of Edinoverie, the document regulating the "union" between the official church and the Old Believers. Although the Metropolitan's rules satisfied some of the wishes of the Old Believers, the Edinoverie parishioners nevertheless remained second-class citizens within the Church: for example, the Old-Rite priests were still normally not permitted to administer sacraments to the mainstream Orthodox believers.

=== Edinoverie in the 19th century ===
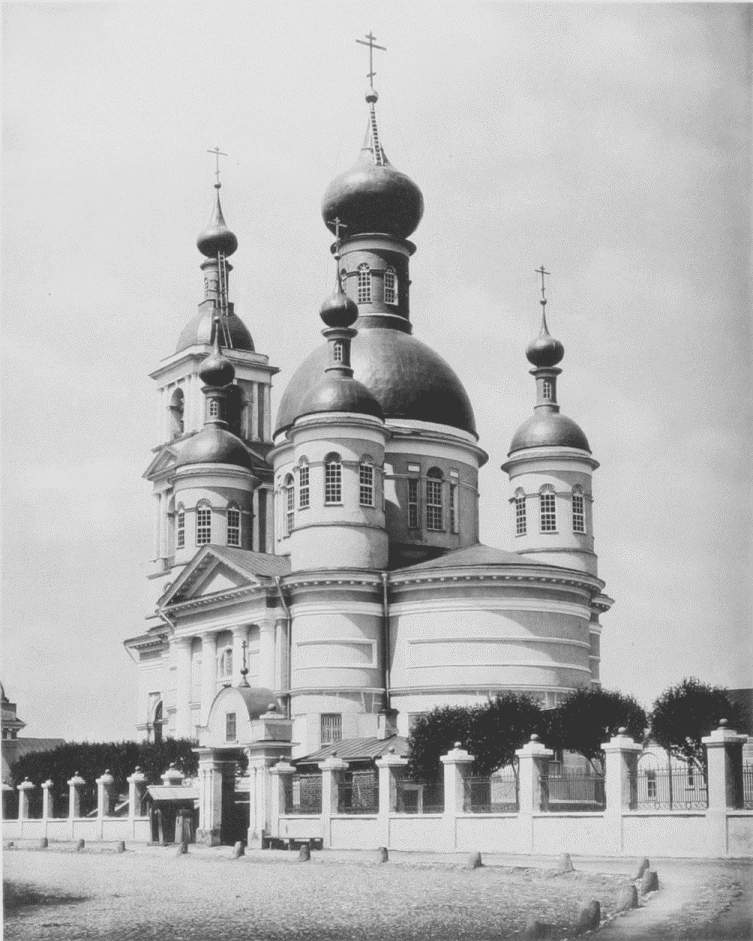
Church of the Life-Giving Trinity at Saltykov Bridge, built in 1819

After the adoption of the main points of 1800, Edinoverie in the first quarter of the 19th century spread rather slowly. According to information from Simon (Shleev), only 10 Edinoverie churches were founded during this period. Of great importance for the existence of Edinoverie was the establishment by a Synod decree of December 31, 1818, of an Edinoverie printing house at the Moscow Trinity-Presentation Church in Moscow for the printing of liturgical books in the pre-reform edition. The organisation of new Edinoverie parishes was accompanied by difficulties. In 1804, The Holy Synod refused the monk Gerasim and his companions from the Vysokovsky Monastery in Kostroma Governorate on the grounds that Edinoverie "was established only for parish churches, not monasteries". The church authorities kept strict watch over compliance with Metropolitan Platon's points and were unwilling to expand the rights of Edinoverie adherents. Such refusals by the ecclesiastical authorities did not add to the authority of the as yet unstrengthened Edinoverie. Another blow to the "conditional union" was struck by the rules imperially confirmed on March 26, 1822, under which Old Believers were permitted openly to have priests where there were prayer houses or churches. Now adherents of the old faith had no need to accept Edinoverie; they could freely have priests who "served for them according to the old books." At this time many petitions appeared from Old Believers in various cities of Russia requesting to have "fugitive priests". These petitions were for the most part granted; sometimes adherents of the old faith were "permitted to have priests on condition that they be subject to the diocesan authority". Proposals to receive priests according to the rules of Edinoverie from the church authorities to Old Believers were rejected by them. The general attitude towards those who had passed from the schism to Edinoverie turned negative. N. V. Varadinov noted that at this same time if an Edinoverie adherent "was tried in criminal proceedings in the ordinary judicial process and was punished, … then for an Old Believer the punishment was either cancelled or mitigated".

A change in attitude towards Edinoverie adherents came about during the reign of Nicholas I. This was connected with a transformation in the secular government's view of the problem of the "schism." The government again "began to see in it not only church mutineers but also an anti-state, anti-social element, secret mutineers in general." As a "spiritual-moral" means of struggle, attention was turned to Edinoverie. "…Seeking the success of Edinoverie… among the schismatics, the secular authority of the Nicholaean era measured those successes not so much by the mood of those holding to the former as by their numbers, achieved through the equalisation of the civil rights of Edinoverie adherents with those of Orthodox Christians and through radical measures against the Old Believers." The decree of 1822 on "fugitive priests" was repealed, and flight itself was recognised as "a grave crime". Changes also occurred in the situation of Edinoverie adherents. On August 8, 1832, a decree was issued changing the rules for joining Edinoverie. If previously only "schismatics who had never attended the Orthodox church and were not partaking of Holy Communion" could join an Edinoverie church, now it was "prescribed… to receive into the Edinoverie church those Old Believers who had deviated from Orthodoxy for 10, 20, 30 years or more already," which expanded the possibilities for Old Believers to join Edinoverie. A number of enactments appeared permitting Old Believers to be married in Orthodox or Edinoverie churches without requiring those being married to join the Church beforehand. From 1834 "chapels of Old Believers, built and furnished with precious icons… began to be confiscated by the government and given to Edinoverie adherents". On March 17, 1839, a decree was issued concerning "the burial of Edinoverie adherents," permitting "the burial of deceased Edinoverie adherents in Orthodox or schismatic cemeteries, in accordance with the wish of the dying person or their relatives". In 1848 houses in which Edinoverie churches were located were exempted from the money levy "for housing duty." Simultaneously with this, in the second quarter of the 19th century the civil rights of Old Believers were significantly restricted. In particular, they could not acquire real estate; they were prohibited from issuing metrical records of births and deaths. Old Believers had no right to be witnesses against Orthodox Christians in "litigious and civil cases." Positions "connected with particular influence" were to be "entrusted" only to Orthodox Christians or Edinoverie adherents. From January 1, 1855, Old Believers were deprived of the right to be enrolled in the merchant class. This measure caused "an enormous stir" among Old Believers of the merchant-industrial estate. As a consequence, between December 30 and 31, 1854 there followed "the greatest number of conversions" to Edinoverie. Numerically, Edinoverie during the years of Nicholas I's reign gained approximately 200,000 persons. A significant portion of the Old Believers found spiritual peace in the acquisition of the priesthood and overcame a certain "inadequacy" regarding the insufficiency of the priestly order in their midst. All this played a positive role in achieving a certain level of religious reconciliation of Russian Orthodox society at that time. At the same time, as Simon (Shleev) noted, "many of the Old Believers joined insincerely, for reasons having nothing in common with faith". Old Believers enrolled in Edinoverie parishes often remained true adherents of the "schism". In some places Edinoverie spread with great difficulty. In the Don, Ural, and Terek Cossack hosts, a significant portion of the Cossacks adhered to Old Belief. As the ataman A. D. Stolypin reported, "even the conversion of the chapel in Uralsk into the Edinoverie Assumption Church contributed little to the development of Edinoverie in the region".

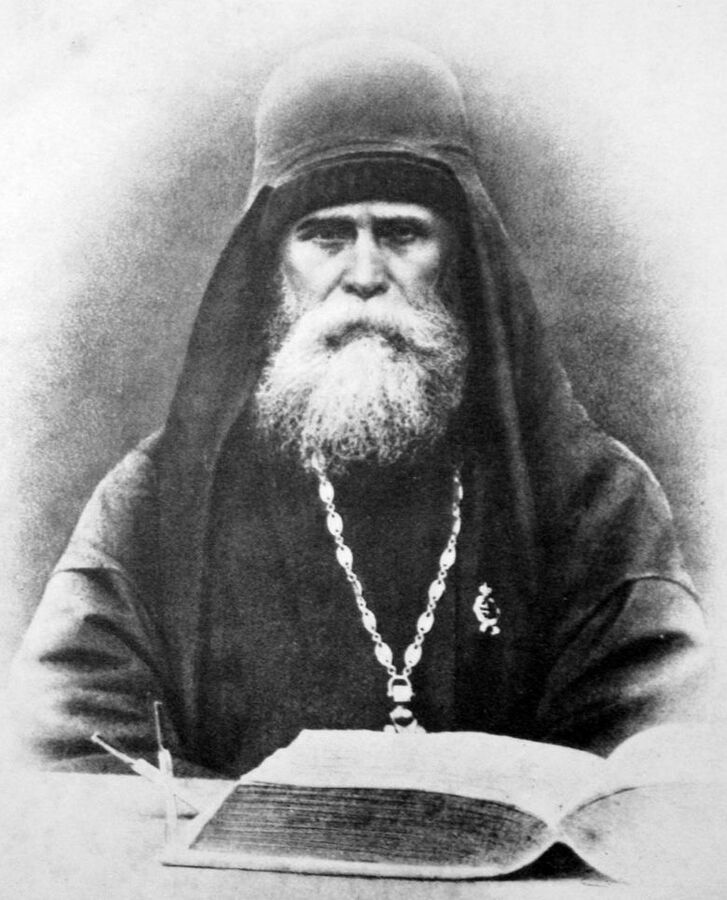
Archimandrite Pavel Prussian

Since 1849, the number of conversions to Edinoverie began to decline. In the view of researchers, the reason for this lay in the fact that at the end of the 1840s news of the Belokrinitsky "false metropolitan" spread among the Old Believers and adherents of the old faith "considered entering into relations with Belaya Krinitsa with the aim of obtaining their own bishop." However, this did not stop the progressive spread of Edinoverie across the country, but merely suspended its effect in certain Old Believer regions. According to official data, from 1840 to 1860 107,670 persons converted to Edinoverie. Subsequently, representatives of the Belokrinitsa agreement also passed to Edinoverie. Noteworthy is the reception on June 23, 1865, in the Moscow Trinity Edinoverie Church by Bishop of Dmitrov Leonid (Krasnopevkov) of a large group of clergy of the Belokrinitsa agreement on the terms of Edinoverie: the archdeacon Filaret (Zakharovich), Bishop of Brailov Onuphrius (Parusov), Bishop of Kolomna Pafnuty (Ovchinnikov), the hieromonk Ioasaph, and the hierodeacon Melchizedek. Immediately after the Chrismation was performed, the newly received Edinoverie adherents were tonsured into monasticism. On July 21, 1865, the former non-okruzhniky Bishop of Tula Sergiy and Archdeacon Kirill (Zagadaev) also joined the Orthodox Church on the terms of Edinoverie. In 1867, Bishop of Tulchin Iustin (Ignatiev) and the hierodeacon Feodosy followed their example. Of great significance was the reception of the monk Pavel Prussian together with 25 disciples, which took place on February 25, 1868. The reception into Edinoverie of such "prominent figures of Old Belief" had far-reaching consequences. The newly received monks formed the brotherhood of the Nicholas Edinoverie Monastery that opened in Moscow. Through the labours of Pavel Prussian and his pupil, the priest of the Pskov Trinity Church and dean of the Edinoverie churches Konstantin Golubev, a printing house was established in Pskov where the journal Istina was published, serving missionary purposes. A school was opened for "children of the Edinoverie clergy," whose aim was "to prepare capable persons to fill Edinoverie church staffs." A similar school was subsequently established at the Nicholas Monastery, where "Father Pavel personally directed the studies of the young people".

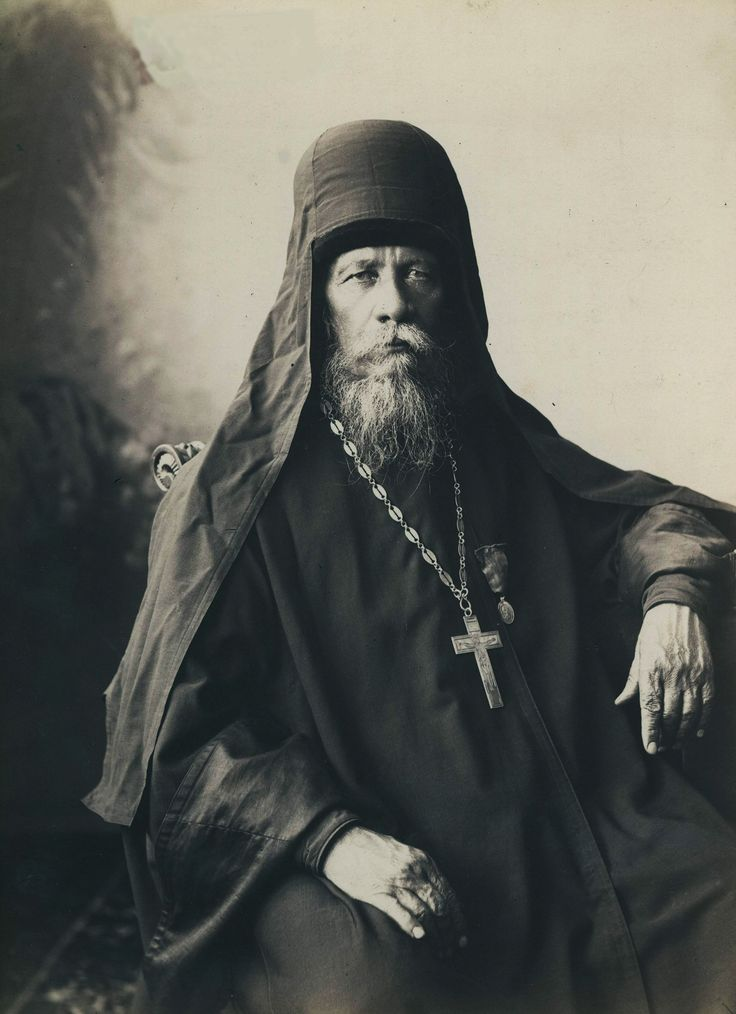
Prior of the Kerzhensky Annunciation Monastery Hegumen Filaret. 1897.

A new phase in the development of Edinoverie began at the turn of the 1850s–1860s. This period was characterised by the curtailment of mass repressions against Old Believers and the reduction of state support for Edinoverie, which led to a mass departure of "insincere" Edinoverie adherents. At the same time, important changes took place in the leadership of Edinoverie communities, whose representatives from the 1860s began to fight for the rights and improved status of Edinoverie adherents. This was expressed in the creation in 1864 of a project for the establishment of an Edinoverie episcopate, which was rejected by the authorities. Within Edinoverie circles, a search for confessional identity began (some came to see themselves as a distinct religious-cultural group with common interests), complicated by the "borderline" position of Edinoverie between official Orthodoxy and Old Belief. The search for identity and the consolidation of Edinoverie adherents was aided by the emergence of leaders who by personal example and through numerous polemical and missionary works proved the possibility and necessity of accepting Edinoverie. The major centres of Edinoverie in Russia intensified their activities to expand the rights of Edinoverie adherents, as they felt themselves in "too narrow a framework," that is, in changing certain points of the "Rules" of 1800 that contained a number of discriminatory norms, such as the prohibition on passing from "new-ritualism" to Edinoverie and the ban on Edinoverie priests administering Holy Communion to "new-ritualists." In 1877, Edinoverie adherents gathered "from various parts of Russia" at the Nizhny Novgorod Fair addressed the Holy Synod with a petition in which they indicated the necessity of "granting the Edinoverie Church greater rights in its action upon the schism and for more complete unity with the Orthodox Church, and petitioned for a review and correction of certain points of the Edinoverie Rules of 1800". In the following year, 1878, a similar petition was received from the Moscow Edinoverie adherents. In response to these petitions from Edinoverie adherents, a "special decree" of the Holy Synod was drawn up in 1881, confirmed by the highest authority on July 4 of the same year. These decisions expanded the rights of Edinoverie adherents: they were permitted to enter into marriage with Orthodox Christians and to be married either in an Orthodox or an Edinoverie church, as well as to baptise children and perform Orthodox rites in either an Edinoverie or an Orthodox church. But a proviso was made that the Orthodox could turn to an Edinoverie priest for rites not always, but only in "extreme necessity, in a case of death, where it was impossible to find an Orthodox priest and church," and it was particularly emphasised "that such recourse should in no way serve as grounds for enrolment of the Orthodox person in Edinoverie." Only those who had avoided fulfilling the sacraments of the Orthodox Church for more than five (instead of the former ten) years could pass to Edinoverie, but only "with the special permission of the diocesan bishop regarding each such person individually." The Synod, at the request of the Edinoverie adherents themselves, also confirmed in the "Decree" point 16 of the "Rules" of 1800, which forbade disputes, discord, and abuse on the part of Edinoverie adherents and Orthodox Christians regarding the observance of different rites and different books used in worship. The Synod expressed the hope that "the Edinoverie adherents themselves will refrain from any reproach of services conducted according to the corrected books and rites and will not shun communion with all children of the One, Holy, and Apostolic Church in prayer and sacraments, nor hinder their priests from doing so. But in the same way, all Orthodox children of the Greco-Russian Church in their turn, when visiting Edinoverie churches, are obliged to observe both respect for the statute and order of those churches and the reverence befitting the holiness of the temple". The Synod made a proviso in the spirit of Metropolitan Platon's ruling, that "the establishment of Edinoverie churches followed out of condescension by the Orthodox Church, for the ease of the return of those who had separated from it to the bosom of the Church". These concessions changed little in the existing position of Edinoverie. As Ioann Mirolyubov noted: "Views on Edinoverie as a temporary institution aimed ultimately at the unification of rites, with a categorical refusal to recognise equal possibilities in the use of both rites, were expressed quite openly right up to the manifesto of 1905". The belated and minimal measures of the state and church with regard to Edinoverie could not improve the situation, while Old Belief, receiving new concessions from the government (the law of 1883), grew stronger. Despite such deprivation of rights, Edinoverie continued to expand: in 1896, 256 Edinoverie churches were counted, and the number of Old Believers who had joined it in that year constituted 55.3% of the total number of those who joined the Russian Orthodox Church.

=== Edinoverie in the early 20th century ===
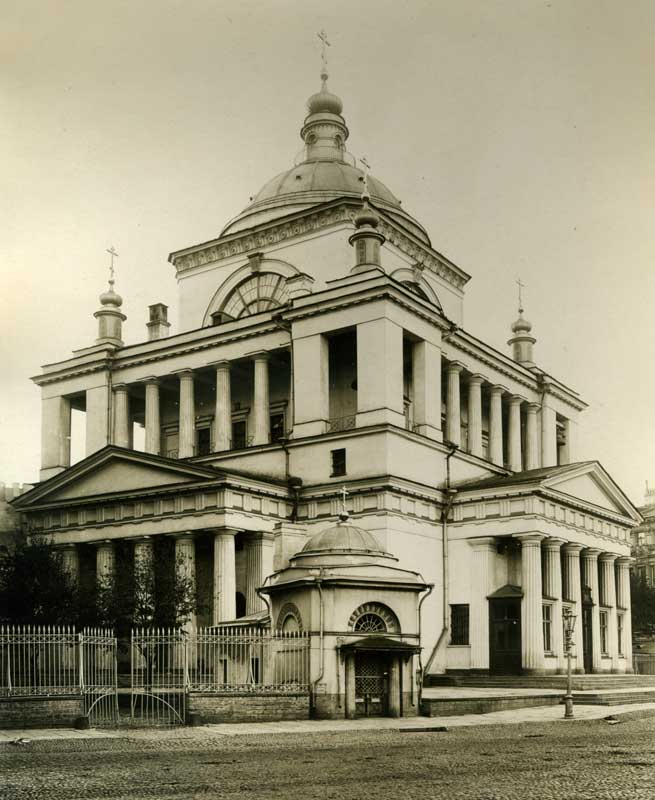
Former Edinoverie Nicholas Cathedral (Saint Petersburg)

In the early 20th century, Edinoverie changed qualitatively. It became a phenomenon of all-Russian character, and increasingly influenced the spiritual life of Russian society. Moreover, the time had come for a cardinal change in views on the history and causes of the 17th-century church schism: in the theological academies, professors such as N. I. Subbotin at chairs of the history and refutation of the schism were replaced by historians who possessed not only remarkable scholarly talent but also the aspiration to uphold scientific objectivity — professors N. F. Kapterev, E. E. Golubinsky, A. A. Dmitrievsky, and others. In 1900, there was a big centennial jubilee celebration: in all Edinoverie churches a festive epistle of the Holy Synod was proclaimed publicly, in which Edinoverie adherents were named "sons of the Orthodox Church", while in provincial cities Orthodox bishops celebrated episcopal services in these churches according to the old rite; the entire former view of Edinoverie as a temporary institution, created out of condescension and exclusively for missionary purposes, however, remained unchanged. The position of Edinoverie adherents was rendered even more ambiguous by the decree of Emperor Nicholas II On the Strengthening of the Principles of Religious Toleration of April 17, 1905, which among other things cancelled punishments for "apostasy" from Orthodoxy to other confessions; as a result, Old Believers who had gained freedom found themselves for the first time legally in a more advantageous position than Edinoverie adherents, who remained under the strict control of the Synod.

In these circumstances, Edinoverie adherents made efforts to consolidate Edinoverie and with particular urgency raised the question of an Edinoverie bishop and the lifting of the "anathemas" against the old rites. The leading apologist and most energetic personality of Edinoverie in this period was the priest Simeon Ivanovich Shleev, who from 1905 was the prior of the Nicholas Edinoverie Church in Saint Petersburg, which became a centre of attraction for all of Russian Edinoverie. The patron of Edinoverie adherents became the prominent hierarch of that era, Archbishop of Volyn Anthony (Khrapovitsky). As Ioann Mirolyubov noted, this time "can be called a time of the consolidation of Edinoverie, a time of finding and deepening its own self-consciousness. It was rich in events, presentiments, and expectations, and it can even be called in its own way a romantic time for Edinoverie adherents". A significant turn occurred for Edinoverie: it definitively became a kind of "elite," relatively consolidated form of Orthodoxy, having a comparatively small number of followers who were devoted adherents of the idea of the unity of the Russian Church with a diversity of rites, conservatives in their political convictions. Among Edinoverie adherents, intellectuals came to the fore: scholars, thinkers, educated priests. The number of Edinoverie parishes in this period continued to increase intensively: in 1908–1914 alone, the number of churches grew from 420 to 541. Protopriest Simeon Shleev at the Local Council in September 1917, noted that by that time the Russian Republic had 600 Edinoverie parishes. The number of Russian Edinoverie adherents at the time of the Council may have been more than 500,000 persons.

The main events in the history of pre-revolutionary Edinoverie were: in 1906 the 4th Missionary Congress in Kyiv and in 1907 the 6th Division of the Pre-Conciliar Presence, which declared "the equal honour of the old and new rites". In 1909, the Moscow Edinoverie Congress convened, gathering more than a hundred deputies from clergy and laity. The representative of the Synod at the Edinoverie Congress was Archbishop of Vyborg and Finland Sergius (Stragorodsky). From January 22 to 30, 1912 in Saint Petersburg the First All-Russian Edinoverie Congress was held, chaired by Archbishop of Volyn Anthony (Khrapovitsky). The agenda of the Congress included: a review of the rules of Edinoverie; questions of worship in Edinoverie churches; questions concerning the organisation of the Edinoverie community and the general governance of Edinoverie in Russia; the question of the anathemas of the Moscow Councils of the 17th century; the problem of attracting into the bosom of the so-called Orthodox Church Old Believer beglopopovtsy and representatives of other agreements. Special attention at the Congress was paid to the declaration of the principle of church conciliarity, which found a wide response among the Orthodox public of the time. On January 31, 1912, a group of Congress deputies was received by Nicholas II. At this meeting Metropolitan Anthony raised the question of the official designation of Edinoverie adherents as «orthodox Old Believers». From July 23 to 29, 1917, in the Edinoverie Saviour Transfiguration Church in Nizhny Novgorod, under the chairmanship of Archbishop of Ufa Andrew (Ukhtomsky), the Second All-Russian Edinoverie Congress was held, gathering 216 delegates, at which among other matters delegates to the forthcoming Local Council were elected and candidates for the proposed episcopal sees were nominated.

=== Soviet period ===
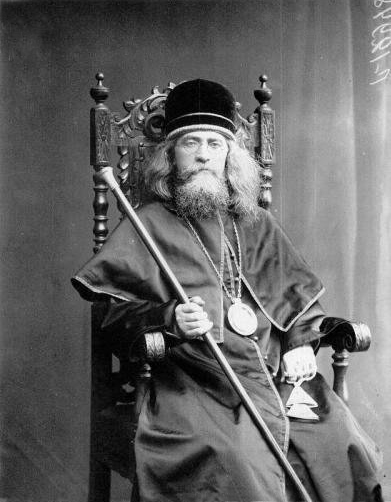
Bishop of Okhta Simon (Shleev)

The Local Council of 1917–1918 was of great significance for Edinoverie. By this time Edinoverie adherents had more than 600 active churches, some of which still impress with their size and magnificence (for example, the Nicholas Cathedral in Saint Petersburg, now the Arctic and Antarctic Museum), 9 male monasteries, 9 female monasteries, 1 female monastic community (in Tver), 90 monks, 170 nuns, more than 170 male novices, and more than 480 female novices. On February 22 (March 7) the Council, in replacement of the former "Platonian" Edinoverie rules, adopted a Decree on Edinoverie consisting of 19 points. According to this Decree, Edinoverie parishes were considered a part of Orthodox dioceses and were governed by special Edinoverie bishops, dependent on the diocesan bishop. The Conciliar Decree confirms the obligatory principle of electivity of all church-serving and sacred-serving positions, including episcopal ones (points 6 and 9). The books and rites used by Edinoverie adherents were named Orthodox, and their equal honour with those in general use was attested by the absence of any obstacles to the passage of children of the Russian Orthodox Church into Edinoverie parishes and vice versa. The possibility was fixed of an ordinary parish passing to the old rite, and likewise in the reverse direction, for which the expression of the wish of four-fifths of all full-rights parishioners was required. The only thing that could not be resolved at the Council was the examination of the question of lifting the anathemas against the old Russian church rites, although this had previously been included in the Council's programme.

On 3 (16) June 1918, the protopriest Simeon Shleev, tonsured into monasticism with the name Simon, was consecrated Bishop of Okhta according to the old books in the Trinity Cathedral of the Alexander Nevsky Lavra in Petrograd. His consecration was led by Patriarch Tikhon. In the early 1920s, the state of Edinoverie changed sharply. The consequences of the Revolution and the Civil War fell most severely on the Edinoverie parishes of Moscow and Saint Petersburg. The most active parishioners of these communities had for the most part been subjected to the deprivations of wartime and could no longer take an active part in the life of All-Russian Edinoverie. An irreplaceable loss for Edinoverie adherents was the martyr's death of the first Edinoverie bishop, Hieromartyr Simon of Okhta, killed in August 1921 in Ufa. Following Bishop Simon, the following were consecrated: Bishop of Mstyora Ambrose (Sosnovsky) (1918–1926), Bishop of Volsk, then Mstyora Iov (Rogozhin) (1927–1933), Bishop of Bogorodsk Nikanor (Kudryavtsev) (1921–1923), Bishop of Kerzhenets Pavel (Volkov) (1922–1929), Bishop of Kushva Irenaeus (Shulmin) (1923), Bishop of Satka Pyotr (Gasilov) (1922–1924), Bishop of Satka Rufin (Brekhov) (1925–1930), Bishop of Satka Vassian (Veretennikov) (1926–1937). The fears of certain ecclesiastical and secular persons that after the establishment of the Edinoverie episcopal institute the Edinoverie parishes would become isolated and possibly even form an independent or autonomous Edinoverie church proved unfounded. Ioann Mirolyubov noted that "the majority of Edinoverie bishops in reality turned out to be bi-ritual. In some cases, a bishop consecrated as an Edinoverie bishop for a time became entirely or in a combined capacity a new-rite bishop; in other cases — exactly the reverse". Thus "while maintaining different church rites within it," the Russian Orthodox Church "revealed its true confessional unity".

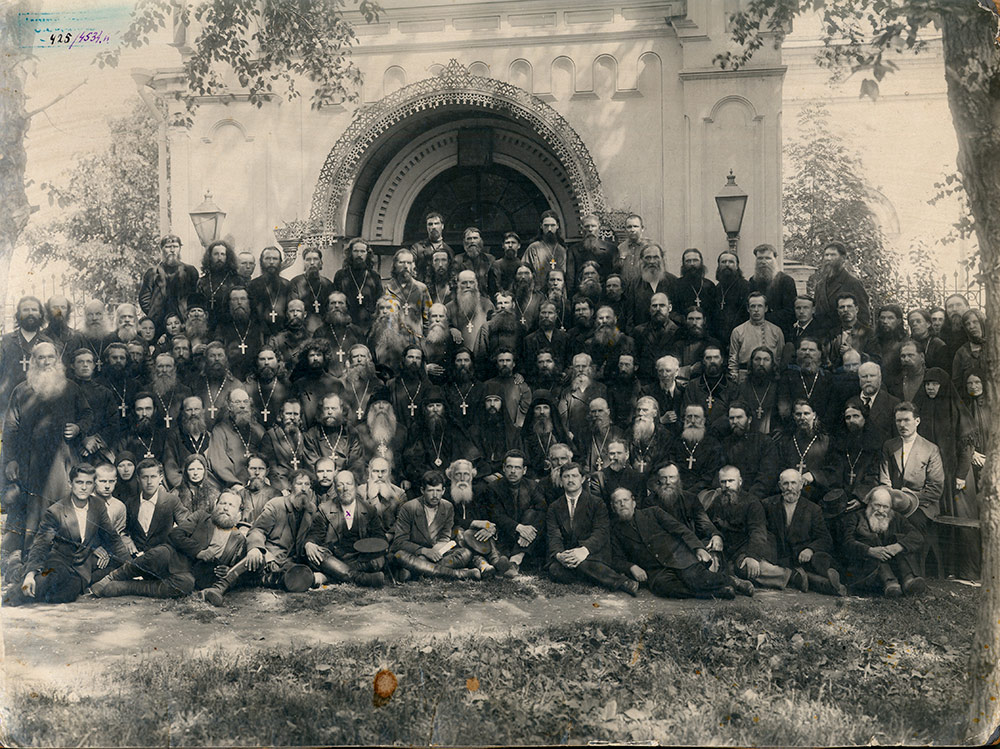
Participants in the Third All-Russian Edinoverie Congress. 1927

From June 19 to 22, 1927, in Nizhny Novgorod the Third All-Russian Edinoverie Congress was held. According to some information, 142 delegates from approximately two hundred Edinoverie parishes throughout the country were present. The majority of the Congress's decisions were not implemented due to repressions against the clergy and the faithful, up to their physical destruction, and the mass closure of churches. The Resolution ("Act") of the Temporary Patriarchal Holy Synod under the chairmanship of the deputy of the patriarchal locum tenens, Metropolitan Sergius, of 10 (23) April 1929 recognised the equal salvific value of the old rite, lifted the anathemas from the Old Believers, and declared the resolutions of the Grand Moscow Council of 1666–1667 invalid. On June 2, 1971, the Synodal decision of 1929 was confirmed by the Local Council of the Russian Orthodox Church of 1971, which also noted the unnecessary and violent character of the 17th-century church reform and definitively affirmed the identity not only of Edinoverie but also of Old Belief with Orthodoxy: "The Holy Local Council of the Russian Orthodox Church lovingly embraces all who sacredly preserve the Russian rites, both as members of our Holy Church, and those who call themselves Old Believers but sacredly confess the salvific Orthodox faith. […] The salvific significance of rites is not contradicted by the diversity of their outward expression, which has always been inherent in the ancient undivided Church of Christ". At the Local Council of 1988, the decrees of the Council of 1971 were repeated.

The Edinoverie of the Soviet era has been insufficiently studied, but in general one may speak of its extinction under conditions of repression. As the priest Ioann Mirolyubov notes, the Soviet-era repressions affected followers of the old rite more severely than those of the new rite: "among the Edinoverie parishes there were no signs whatsoever of Renovationism, of adaptation to the time and the authorities; […] the main body of parishioners of the Edinoverie parishes belonged precisely to those estates that were subject to repression and complete annihilation; […] in Edinoverie parishes the tradition of communality, mutual support, and participation was strong, which must have particularly enraged the godless; […] in Edinoverie communities the spirit of popular tradition, pochvennichestvo, deeply rooted everyday and family life was strong, which also caused the builders of the 'new society' particular concern". On March 11, 1937, the Patriarchal locum tenens Metropolitan Sergius issued decree no. 31, prescribing that due to the absence (arrest) of the Edinoverie Bishop Vassian (Veretennikov) "the governance of Edinoverie parishes in each diocese until further notice be transferred to the local Archpastors on a general basis". The faithful performed services at home in a lay fashion; individual parishes gradually passed to the new rite. There were many unregistered communities; the flock of Bishop Simon (Shleev) continued to maintain its tradition; virtually all settlements and stanitsy of the former Ural Host had prayer houses and communities of descendants of Edinoverie adherents, small groups of whom have survived to the present day. A number of Edinoverie parishes existed for a long time in Sverdlovsk Oblast in the post-war period. The last church of the Moscow Edinoverie adherents until the 1960s was the Nicholas Church on Rogozhskoye Cemetery, after which Edinoverie services were held only in the southern (dedicated to the icon of the Mother of God Troeruchitsa) chapel of this church (they ceased in 1988). In Vyazniki, Vladimir Oblast, since the 1940s, two staffs of clergy existed in one church, serving in turn – one Edinoverie and one new-rite, that persisted until the 1970s. By the end of the Soviet era only a few Edinoverie parishes remained unclosed (in the village of Maloye Murashkino in Gorky Oblast, two parishes in Latvia, and in the village of Zlynka in the Kirovograd Diocese of the Ukrainian SSR).

=== In the Russian emigration ===
Almost from the very moment of its emergence, the Russian Orthodox Church Outside of Russia (ROCOR) at an official level expressed interest in establishing friendly relations with the Old Orthodox Christians. At the First All-Diaspora Council of 1921, Metropolitan Anthony Khrapovitsky in a special appeal called upon Russian Old Believers "in the diaspora" to forget past grievances and quarrels and to think about "union with the Church that is now not 'dominant' but persecuted by the enemies of Christ's faith". Metropolitan Anthony's favourable attitude towards the ancient rite largely determined the position of the ROCOR episcopate towards Old Believers.

In 1964, the Synod of Bishops of the Russian Church Abroad elected Bishop Filaret (Voznesensky) as the new First Hierarch. Since he did not hold metropolitan rank, the reader and iconographer Dmitry Alexandrov reproduced the ancient 15th-century liturgical rite according to which the solemn enthronement took place. This prompted the bishops of the ROCOR then and there to declare: "The so-called old rite is the ancient liturgical rite of the Russian Orthodox Church, which was in use before the liturgical reforms of the mid-17th century. The Church finds nothing reprehensible or heretical in it and blesses the use of this rite for those wishing to preserve the ancient books and ancient liturgical customs". In 1967, at the next Synod of Bishops of the ROCOR, a memorandum from the priest Dmitry Alexandrov on the mission among representatives of Old Belief was read out. The ROCOR episcopate, welcoming Old Believers who wished to draw closer to the Orthodox Church, instructed the Scholarly Committee attached to the ROCOR Synod of Bishops to study the question of the possibility of lifting the "anathemas" against the old rites.

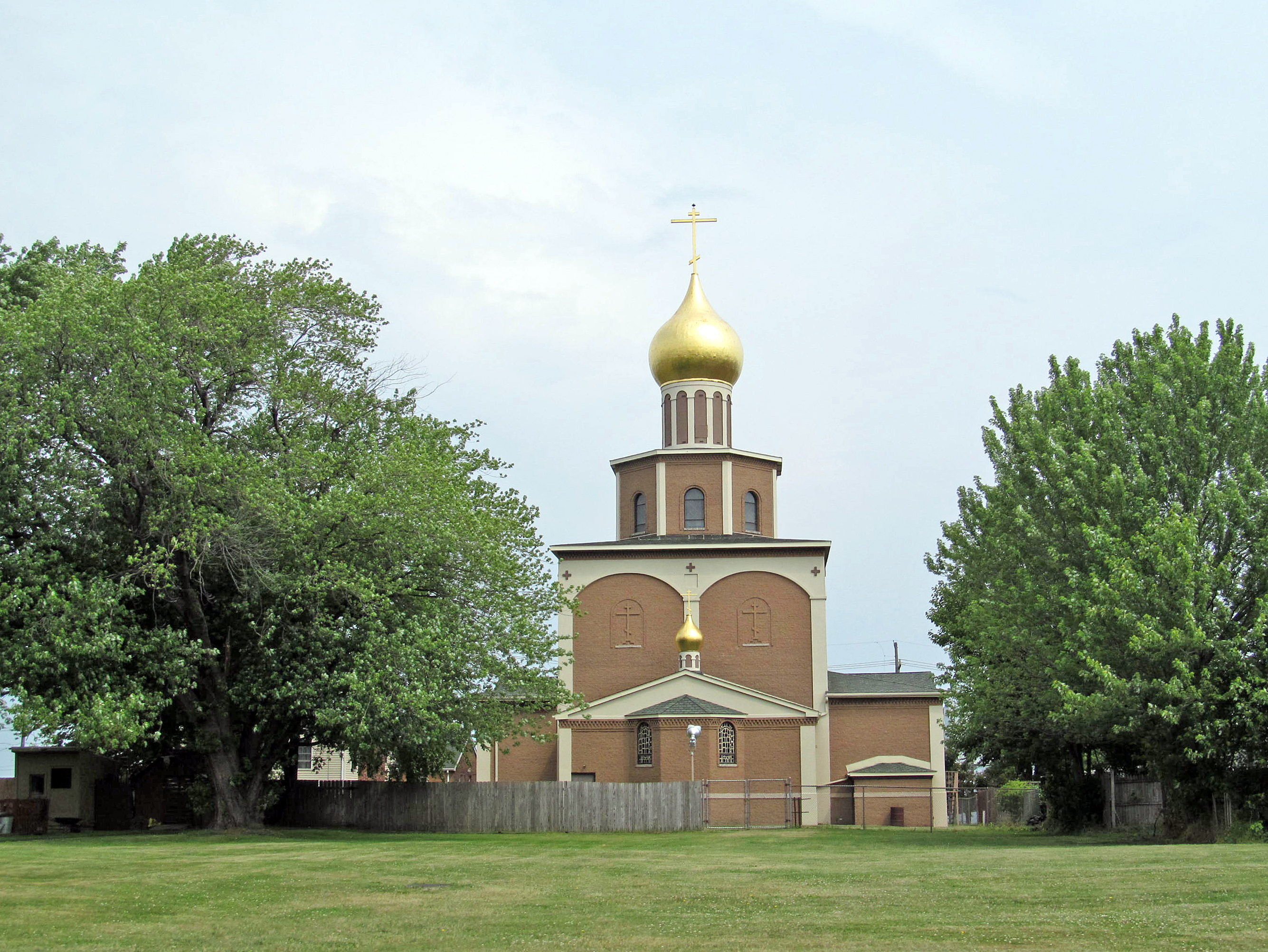
Church of the Nativity of Christ in Erie, Pennsylvania, USA

At the Third All-Diaspora Council of the ROCOR in 1974, the idea of the need for rapprochement with representatives of the Old Orthodox was expressed on numerous occasions. Thus, Archbishop of Geneva and Western Europe Anthony (Bartoshevich) referred to the appeal of Metropolitan Anthony (Khrapovitsky) and to his conciliatory position towards Old Believers. For many participants in the Council, the resolution of the Old Believer question was conceived as the completion of the work begun by the first primate of the ROCOR. After a lengthy discussion, the delegates of the Council produced a draft document aimed at maximum rapprochement with representatives of Old Belief. The Synod of Bishops of 1974, taking into account that the delegates of the Third All-Diaspora Council had urgently requested the lifting of the anathemas against the old rites, on September 25, 1974, issued a special decree on the ancient liturgical traditions and rites, which were henceforth to be regarded as Orthodox and salvific.

The position of the ROCOR episcopate, as well as the missionary-enlightenment ministry of the priest Dimitry Alexandrov, contributed to the fact that in 1983 a large group of pomorians, representing the parish of the Church of the Nativity of Christ in Erie, Pennsylvania, USA, joined the ROCOR. The leader of this community, Pimen Simon, was ordained as a priest according to the old printed books. Information about the successful mission among Old Believers was recorded in the minutes of the ROCOR Synod of Bishops of 1983. The ROCOR primate himself, Metropolitan Filaret (Voznesensky), emphasised that "there are positive phenomena are observed, such as… the joining of many Old Believers to us".

In 1988, the ROCOR episcopate headed by Metropolitan Vitaly (Ustinov), in fulfilment of the intention of Metropolitan Anthony (Khrapovitsky), made the decision to establish an Edinoverie hierarchy. In August 1988 the consecration took place of the first Edinoverie bishop, Daniil (Alexandrov), with the title Bishop of Erie for Old Believers, Vicar of the First Hierarch of the Russian Orthodox Church Outside Russia. The Synod of Bishops of the ROCOR of 1994, reflecting on the mission of Orthodoxy in the contemporary world, turned to the positive experience of the Erie Edinoverie community, whose members had managed to adapt to the new historical and ecclesiastical realities while remaining faithful to the traditions and culture of the past.

In October 2000, the participants of the Synod of Bishops addressed adherents of the old rites with a special Epistle, which once more fixed the provisions adopted in 1974 but also in effect acknowledged guilt for the crimes and offences committed against Old Believers and asked forgiveness on behalf of those who had committed those crimes:

We deeply regret the cruelties inflicted on adherents of the Old Rite, such as the persecution by civil authorities inspired by some of our predecessors in the Russian Church hierarchy. Forgive us, brothers and sisters, for the hateful acts we have committed against you. Do not consider us accomplices in the sins of our predecessors, nor blame us for their intemperate deeds. Although we are the descendants of your persecutors, we are not responsible for the suffering you endured. Forgive these offences so that we too may be free from the reproach that weighs upon them. We bow down before you and ask for your prayers. Forgive those who offended you with reckless violence; through our lips, they repent of their actions and ask for your forgiveness. In the XX century, the Orthodox Russian Church was subject to new persecutions, this time at the hands of the godless communist regime. We acknowledge with sorrow that the great persecution of our Church in recent decades may be God's punishment for the persecution of the children of the Old Rite by our predecessors. We acknowledge the bitter consequences of the events that divided us, thereby weakening the spiritual power of the Russian Church. We solemnly proclaim our profound desire to heal the wounds inflicted on the Church.

=== Post-Soviet period ===
After the collapse of the Soviet Union, Edinoverie in the Russian Orthodox Church began to revive in a somewhat different form — the initiative to create parishes came from below, representing a kind of "internal emigration" within the ROC on the part of those unwilling to accept Nikon's ritual innovations and the conservative part of the ROC (contemporary Edinoverie adherents often have no direct continuity from the former ones). At the same time, a significant portion of the Edinoverie parishes represents communities of former Old Believers. Thus, the greatest success of Edinoverie in the 1990s was the reception of the remnants of the non-okruzhniky in the historical district of Moscow Oblast — Guslitsa. One of the largest Edinoverie parishes abroad – in Pennsylvania – consists of former Pomortsy. The activity of Edinoverie parishes in Sverdlovsk Oblast is developing, where they consist of former chasovennye. The 1990s and 2000s were marked by the transition of leaders of a number of Old Believer communities to Edinoverie and by the active activity of Edinoverie adherents, in which some Old Believers saw a threat to their cultural and religious identity. This in turn contributed to Old Believers' turning to the polemical experience of the past.

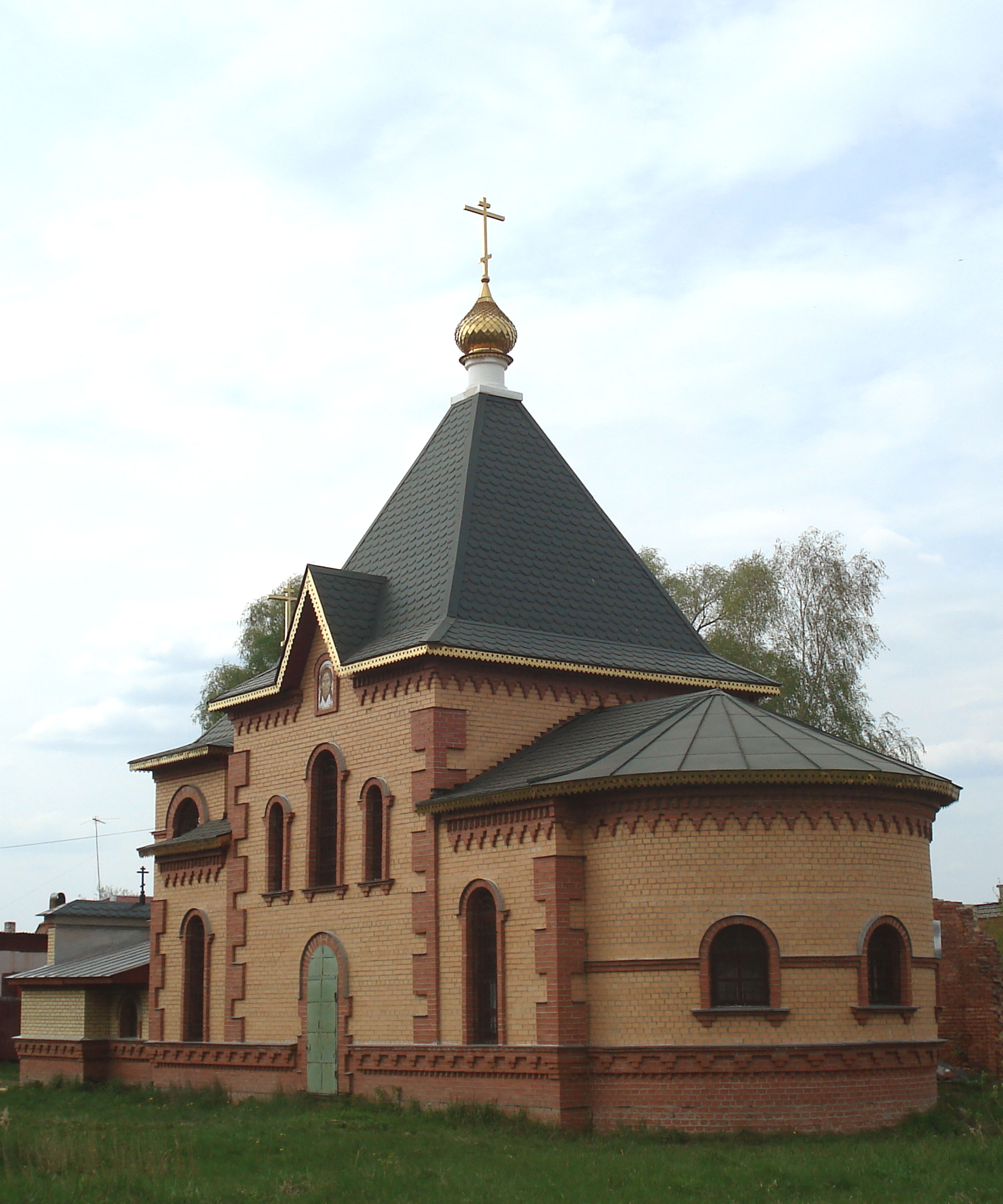
Edinoverie Church of John Climacus in Kurovskoye (Moscow Oblast)

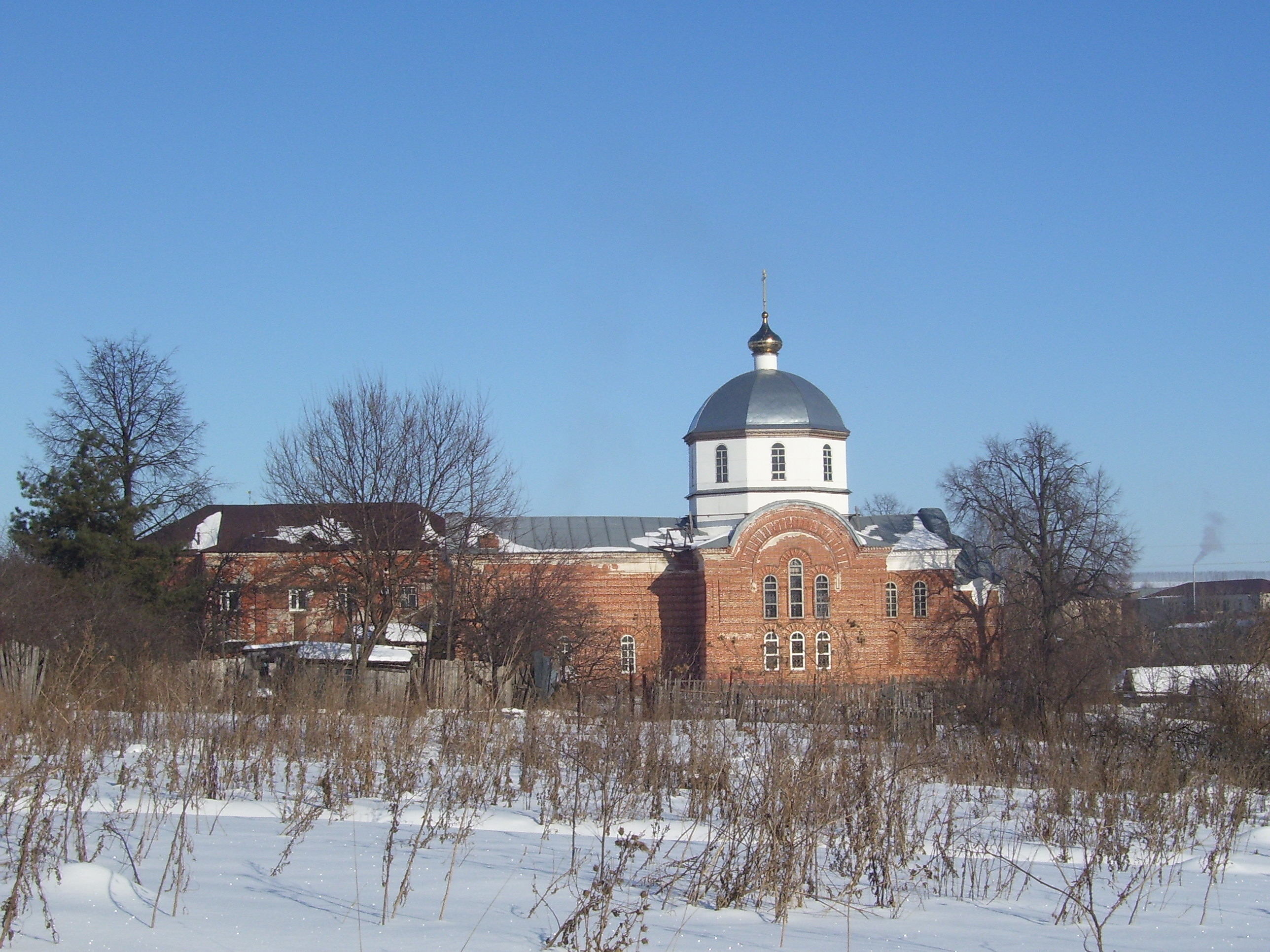
Former Edinoverie Nicholas Church in the village of Bolshoe Murashkino (now a Russian Orthodox Old-Rite Church church)

On June 4, 1999, the Holy Synod of the Russian Church adopted a resolution in which it called upon diocesan bishops and clergy to take into account in their practical activity the all-church decisions lifting the anathemas against the old rites. The Synod called upon church publishing houses "to apply a critical approach to the reprinting of literature published before the Revolution, when under the influence of secular power Old Belief was criticised by incorrect and unacceptable methods". The Synod condemned "the forceful methods of overcoming the schism that had taken place in history, which were the result of the interference of secular authorities in the affairs of the Church".

On November 27, 2000, in Moscow a conference was held on the theme "200th Anniversary of the Canonical Existence of Old Rite Parishes in the Bosom of the Russian Orthodox Church". The conference opened with a solemn molieben in the Cathedral of the Assumption of the Moscow Kremlin, performed according to the old rite by the clergy of all Edinoverie parishes of the Moscow Patriarchate. At the conference it was resolved henceforth to call themselves "Old Rite parishes of the Russian Orthodox Church". Patriarch of Moscow and All Russia Alexis II, who appeared at the conference with a welcoming address, gave a high assessment of the fact of the establishment of Edinoverie, through which many had returned from the church schism "…to the Father's house, and became beloved children of Mother Church, heirs of her gracious gifts". The Patriarch particularly emphasised that "the children of the Russian Orthodox Church must remember that the ancient church rites constitute part of our common spiritual-historical heritage, which should be preserved as a special treasure in the liturgical treasury of the Church".

During this period Edinoverie was actively developing with new parishes creating, but at the same time their status remained undefined. Among many representatives of the Russian Orthodox Church, a negative attitude towards Edinoverie and the old rite in general inherited from pre-revolutionary times persisted. As Metropolitan Kirill (Gundiayev) noted in 2004: "To this day in the everyday life of the Church we see almost no facts that would confirm the possibility of the full-fledged existence of two rites in the bosom of the Russian Orthodox Church, which appears to be the most important condition for the restoration of unity with Old Believers in the future. […] Frequently people striving towards Edinoverie find no understanding with us. We have had to hear no small number of sad testimonies of such incomprehension in recent years, both from representatives of Edinoverie adherents and from those wishing to become such. With such an approach, when Old Believer-Edinoverie adherents who desire unity with the Moscow Patriarchate are viewed at best condescendingly and at worst — with hostility, the development of Old Rite communities is extremely hampered and their viability is limited. […] A paradoxical situation arises. The Councils adopt resolutions to regard the anathemas against Old Believers and the derogatory expressions concerning the old Russian church rites as 'as if they had not been,' while at the local level the degree of awareness of the clergy about this is so low that the very decrees themselves become 'as if they had not been'".

On January 12, 2013, for the first time in 350 years, the Divine Liturgy was celebrated according to the ancient rite in the Cathedral of the Assumption of the Moscow Kremlin. The cathedral, which holds no fewer than 500 persons, was full, and among those praying were not only Edinoverie adherents but also many Old Believers.

Protopriest Ioann Mirolyubov notes that Old Believers often transfer to the Russian Orthodox Church, but a uniform rite for the reception of Old Believers into the Church has not been worked out, and different priests receive them by all three rites, as each one wishes.

On May 30, 2014, the Holy Synod of the Russian Orthodox Church resolved:

1. Considering the discrepancies encountered in contemporary pastoral practice, the Holy Synod's resolution no. 1116 of 25 May 1888 is confirmed, which states that those baptised in Old Believer communities are accepted into the Russian Orthodox Church through the Sacrament of Chrismation.

2. To instruct the Synodal Commission on Worship jointly with the Commission on the Affairs of Old Rite Parishes and on Cooperation with Old Belief to edit the rites of reunification with the Church for followers of Old Believer agreements taking into account the resolution of the Holy Local Council of the Russian Orthodox Church of 1971 and subsequent conciliar acts, and thereafter to submit the texts of the rites for approval by the Holy Synod.

3. To remind that, according to the judgement of Saint Filaret, Metropolitan of Moscow, confirmed by the long-standing practice of Edinoverie parishes, Old Believers who have reunited with the Russian Orthodox Church are permitted to commemorate in prayers their relatives who died outside of communion with it.

4. In the event of an Old Believer who has previously taken monastic vows joining the Russian Orthodox Church, he, at his wish, shall be recognised as being in the monastic state.

5. To recommend that in the study of the history of Old Belief and Edinoverie in theological educational institutions of the Russian Orthodox Church, the spirit of Christian love and the aspiration to overcome existing divisions be followed.

On March 24, 2022, the Holy Synod of the Russian Orthodox Church approved the Statute on the Old Rite Parishes of the Russian Orthodox Church.

== Old Ritualists in Communion with the See of Rome ==
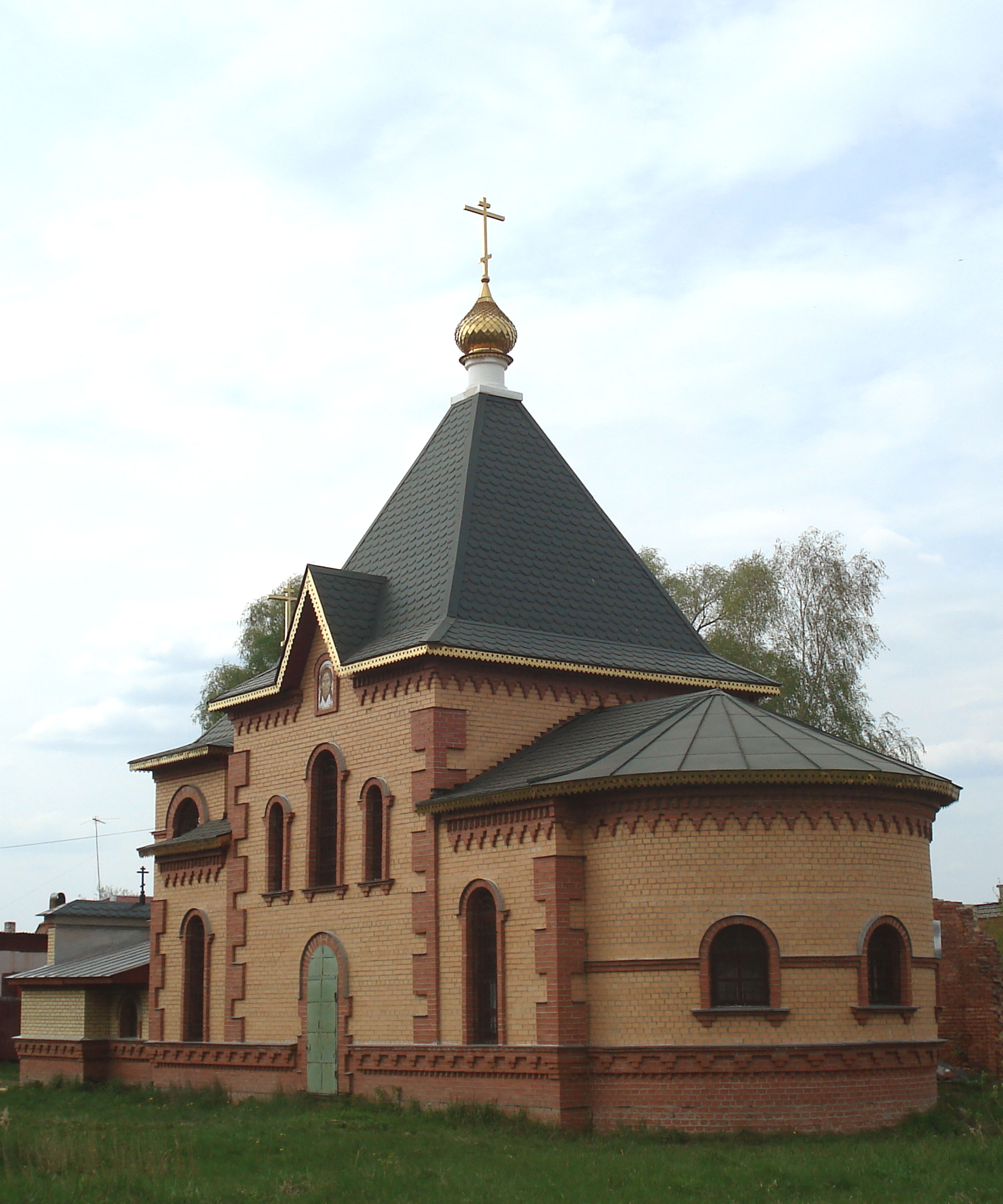
Edinoverie Church of John Climacus in Kurovskoye, Guslitsa, Moscow oblast (2000)

Some Old Believers have been received into communion with the Catholic Church as Eastern Catholics while maintaining their distinctive rites, thus making them Eastern Catholic equivalents of the Edinoverie. The most famous convert is Potapy Emelianov, a former Edinoverie priest in Luhansk Oblast, Ukraine. In 1918, he was received into the Russian Catholic Church with his entire parish, which was located at Nizhnaya Bogdanovka, near Kadiivka in the Luhansk Oblast of modern Ukraine. He later survived a ten-year sentence at Solovki prison camp and died in 1936. As of 2003, his cause for canonization is open.

According to a 2005 interview, Russian Catholic priest Sergei Golovanov stated that there was then one Old-Ritualist Catholic priest active on Russian soil.

== Edinoverie in the media ==
Edinoverie has been the subject of television broadcasts on the channels Russia-24, Soyuz, and Tsargrad TV. Representatives of the leadership of the Russian Orthodox Church, for example Metropolitan Ilarion (Alfeyev), and of Edinoverie, like the philosopher Alexander Dugin, Protopriest Pyotr Chubarov, Priest Sergiy Chizh, Protopriest Ioann Mirolyubov, Mikhail Tyurenkov, Priest Sergiy Komarov, Vladimir Basenkov, and others appeared as guests in television and radio programmes.

From 2015 to 2017, a cycle of cultural-historical programmes by Alexander Gnyp on Old Belief entitled Kulugur was broadcast on the Christian Radio Maria. Guests of the programme included clergy, historians, philosophers, philologists, and Edinoverie and Old Believer clergy and community leaders. In June 2016, in a conversation about Edinoverie on the programme Kulugur, the Old Believer Metropolitan Cornelius (Titov) participated.

In 2017, Vladimir Basenkov, head of the Centre of the Old Russian Liturgical Tradition in Simbirsk, launched the project Hidden Russia, dedicated to studying the life, condition, numbers, features, and prospects of all Edinoverie communities currently existing in the world. Publications within the project are placed on such media resources as Pravoslavie.ru, Elitsy Media, Pravoslavie.fm, and on the project's namesake website. Since 2022 the educational website of the Hidden Russia project has been maintained by the "Society of Hieromartyr Andrew (Ukhtomsky)".

== Edinoverie communities ==
In the Russian Orthodox Church, Edinoverie communities are subordinated to the governing bishops of the dioceses of the Russian Orthodox Church. According to an assessment by Metropolitan Ilarion (Alfeyev), by 2021 there were approximately 40 such communities. An exact figure is difficult to give due to the absence of a legally defined definition in the charter documents of the Russian Orthodox Church of what an Edinoverie parish is.

A number of Edinoverie churches are in a ruined state. About a dozen half-destroyed Edinoverie churches on the territory of West Kazakhstan Oblast are not being restored, and a significant part of the descendants of Edinoverie adherents and Old Believers attend services in general Orthodox churches. Despite the fact that over time the number of Old Rite communities and clergy is growing, there have been isolated transfers of Edinoverie adherents to Old Belief or various "splinters" of the ROCOR; the Edinoverie parish in Nizhny Novgorod was closed; the authorities are impeding the return of the Edinoverie Church of St John the Baptist in Uralsk, where there are numerous descendants of Edinoverie adherents. At the same time, in a number of traditionally Old Believer localities (in Guslitsy, in the Urals) a mass conversion of descendants of Old Believers to the Russian Orthodox Church is taking place in ordinary new-rite parishes.

A project for a "Statute on the Old Rite Parishes of the Russian Orthodox Church" is being developed currently, since the regulations governing the life of Edinoverie parishes both from the Synodal period and from the Local Council of the Russian Orthodox Church of 1917 have in effect lost their force by the present time.

== Statistics ==
In 1903, 10,213 Old Believers joined the Russian Church (of whom 2,461 on the basis of Edinoverie), and in 1904, 9,179 Old Believers joined (of whom 2,298 on the terms of Edinoverie).

As of January 1, 1908, 444,407 Edinoverie adherents were counted, while in the dioceses of Blagoveshchensk, Vladivostok, Grodno, Minsk, Smolensk, Finland, and Yaroslavl there were no Edinoverie adherents at all, and the Irkutsk, Turkestan, Kherson, Kholm dioceses and the Georgian Exarchate did not submit information to the Holy Synod.

The greatest number of Edinoverie adherents as of 1908 resided in: the Orenburg diocese – 89,307; Perm – 52,308; Yekaterinburg — 51,701; and Tomsk — 45,233.

In 1914, Edinoverie churches existed in 48 provinces of the Russian Empire. The largest number of Edinoverie churches was in Samara Governorate (including the churches of Ural Oblast) — 103; Perm (41); Yekaterinburg (35); Don (34); Chernigov (27); Nizhny Novgorod (24); Kostroma (22); and Tomsk (20) dioceses.

In 1990, 3 Old Rite parishes were counted; in 2000, 12.

Statistics by year are as follows:

Year	1901	1904	1905	1906	1907	1908	1912	1914
Number of churches	317	▲398	▼386	▼385	▲415	▲420	▲453	▲541
Number of Edinoverie adherents						444,407		

== See also ==
- Sergiy Yurshev

== Bibliography ==
- Paert, Irina (2003). Old Believers, Religious Dissent and Gender in Russia, 1760–1850. Manchester University Press. ISBN 0-7190-6322-1.
- Kaurkin, R.; Pavlova, O. (2011). Единоверие в России (от зарождения идеи до начала XX века) (in Russian). Saint Petersburg: Алетейя. ISBN 978-5-91419-596-7.
- White, James: A Bridge to the Schism. Edinoverie, Russian Orthodoxy, and the Ritual Formation of Confessions, 1800-1918. (PhD thesis, European University Institute, 2014)
- White, James Matthew (2020). Unity in Faith?: Edinoverie, Russian Orthodoxy, and Old Belief, 1800–1918. Bloomington, IN: Indiana University Press. ISBN 978-0-253-04972-8.
- Barsov, N. "Единоверие". ЭСБЕ. Vol. XIa. p. 553.
- Milovidov, V. F. (2002). Религии народов современной России: Словарь (Religions of the Peoples of Modern Russia: Dictionary) (2nd ed., corrected and enlarged ed.). Moscow: Respublika. p. 98. ISBN 5-250-01818-1.
- Mikhailov, S. S. (2002). "Из истории единоверия в Московской епархии в XIX столетии (From the History of Edinoverie in the Moscow Diocese in the 19th Century)". Церковно-исторический вестник (Church-Historical Bulletin) (9): 83–96.
- Maiorov, R. A. (2003). "Проекты учреждения единоверческих епископов в эпоху свт. Филарета (Дроздова) (Projects for the Establishment of Edinoverie Bishops in the Era of St. Philaret (Drozdov))". Труды научной конференции студентов и аспирантов «Ломоносов-2003». История. Сборник тезисов (Proceedings of the Scientific Conference of Students and Postgraduates "Lomonosov-2003". History. Collection of Abstracts). Moscow: MSU. pp. 36–39.
- Karpets, V. I. (2003). "Что такое единоверие (What is Edinoverie?)". История (History) (27–28 (699/700)).
- Compiled by Priest P. Chubarov, V. N. Pavlov, ed. (2004). Православное единоверие в России (Orthodox Edinoverie in Russia). St. Petersburg: Herzen State Pedagogical University Publishing House. p. 195. ISBN 5-8064-0780-2.
- Simon (Shleev), Bishop (2004). Единоверие в своём внутреннем развитии (в разъяснении его малораспространённости среди старообрядцев) (Edinoverie in Its Internal Development (Explaining Its Limited Spread Among Old Believers)). Moscow: «Medium». p. 480. ISBN 5-85691-059-1.
- Nekhotin, V. V. (2004). "Единоверческое движение в МП (The Edinoverie Movement in the Moscow Patriarchate)". Современная религиозная жизнь России: опыт систематического описания. Т. 1: Православие. Старообрядчество. Духовное христианство. Армянская, Ассирийская церкви. Католичество (Modern Religious Life in Russia: An Experience of Systematic Description. Vol. 1: Orthodoxy. Old Belief. Spiritual Christianity. Armenian, Assyrian Churches. Catholicism). Moscow: Logos. pp. 249–254.
- Compiled by: P. Chubarov, V. N. Pavlov, ed. (2004). Православное единоверие в России (Orthodox Edinoverie in Russia). St. Petersburg: Herzen State Pedagogical University Publishing House. p. 195. ISBN 5-8064-0780-2.
- Благословенным христианам Греции и России: жизнь и труды архиепископа Никифора Феотокиса, (1731–1800) (To the Blessed Christians of Greece and Russia: The Life and Works of Archbishop Nikifor Theotokis, (1731–1800)). Moscow: «Danilovsky Blagovestnik». 2006. p. 344. ISBN 5-89101-175-1.
- Katunin, Y. A.; Belsky, A. V. (2006). "Этапы борьбы за создание церкви у старообрядцев (Stages of the Struggle for the Creation of a Church Among the Old Believers)" (PDF). Культура народов Причерноморья (Culture of the Peoples of the Black Sea Region) (81): 106–109. Archived from the original (PDF) on September 28, 2013.
- Mirolyubov, I. I. (2007). "Пути единоверия в XX столетии (The Paths of Edinoverie in the 20th Century)". In Chief ed. V. N. Vorobyov, archpriest (ed.). Ежегодная Богословская конференция Православного Свято-Тихоновского Гуманитарного Университета: Материалы. Т. 1 : XVII (Annual Theological Conference of the Orthodox St. Tikhon's Humanitarian University: Materials. Vol. 1: XVII). Moscow: PSTGU. pp. 197–204.
- Priest Ioann Mirolyubov, Priest Evgeny Sarancha. "Единоверие". Православная энциклопедия. Vol. 18. pp. 42–50. 189549.
- Ermakova, D. S. (2010). "Сущность понятия «Единоверие» в XIX — начале XXI века (The Essence of the Concept of "Edinoverie" in the 19th – Early 21st Century)". Исторические исследования в Сибири: проблемы и перспективы: Сборник материалов четвёртой региональной молодёжной научной конференции (Historical Research in Siberia: Problems and Prospects: Collection of Materials of the Fourth Regional Youth Scientific Conference). Novosibirsk: Parallel. pp. 69–73.
- Maiorov, R. A. (2010). "К вопросу о попытках изменения положения единоверия во второй половине XIX века (дискуссия 1877 года) (On the Question of Attempts to Change the Position of Edinoverie in the Second Half of the 19th Century (Discussion of 1877))". Церковь и русский мир: История, традиции, современность (The Church and the Russian World: History, Traditions, Modernity). Moscow–Yaroslavl: Remder. pp. 126–131.
- Palkin, A. S. (2010). "Единоверие глазами архиереев РПЦ (XVIII — начало XXI в.) (Edinoverie Through the Eyes of the Hierarchs of the Russian Orthodox Church (18th – Beginning of the 21st Century))". Православие в судьбе Урала и России: история и современность (Orthodoxy in the Fate of the Urals and Russia: History and Modernity). Yekaterinburg. pp. 231–235.
- Pervushin, M. V. (2012). "Единоверие до и после митрополита Платона (Левшина) (Edinoverie Before and After Metropolitan Platon (Levshin))". Угрешский сборник. Выпуск 2. Труды преподавателей Николо-Угрешской православной духовной семинарии: научное издание (Ugresh Collection. Issue 2. Works of the Teachers of the St. Nicholas-Ugresh Orthodox Theological Seminary: Scientific ed.). Moscow: [no publisher indicated]. pp. 120–141.
- Tovbin, K. M. (2015). "Православное единоверие и его роль в русской секуляризации (Orthodox Edinoverie and Its Role in Russian Secularization)". Труды Карельского научного центра РАН (Proceedings of the Karelian Research Center of the Russian Academy of Sciences) (8). Petrozavodsk: 83–96.
- Palkin, A. S. (2016). Единоверие в середине XVIII — начале XX в.: общероссийский контекст и региональная специфика (Edinoverie in the Mid-18th – Early 20th Centuries: All-Russian Context and Regional Specificity) (PDF). Yekaterinburg: Ural University Publishing House; University Publishing House. p. 338. ISBN 978-5-7996-1979-4.
- Drobotushenko, E. V. (2017). "Вопросы о единоверии на Поместном Соборе Православной российской церкви 1917—1918 гг. и сибирское единоверие (Questions on Edinoverie at the Local Council of the Orthodox Russian Church 1917–1918 and Siberian Edinoverie)". Современная научная мысль (Modern Scientific Thought) (3): 29–35.
- text and compilation: Archpriest Evgeny Sarancha, ed. (2018). Труды II и III Всероссийских съездов православных старообрядцев (единоверцев) (Proceedings of the II and III All-Russian Congresses of Orthodox Old Believers (Edinovertsy)). История единоверия (History of Edinoverie). Mikhaylovskaya Sloboda, Moscow Oblast: Edinoverie Society of the Archangel Michael Church in the village of Mikhaylovskaya Sloboda. p. 323. ISBN 978-5-6041357-0-9.
- Basenkov, V. V. (2019). По следам сокрытой Руси : к 165-летию учреждения единоверия на Симбирской земле (In the Footsteps of Hidden Rus: On the 165th Anniversary of the Establishment of Edinoverie in the Simbirsk Land). Сокрытая Русь (Hidden Rus). Ulyanovsk: Master Studio. p. 110. ISBN 978-5-6043087-3-8.
- Shkarovsky, M. V. (2020). "Единоверческие общины Санкт-Петербурга (Ленинграда) в 1900-е — 1930-е гг. (Edinoverie Communities of St. Petersburg (Leningrad) in the 1900s–1930s)" (PDF). Христианское чтение (Christian Reading) (1): 153–173.
- Священный Собор Православной Российской Церкви 1917–1918 гг. о единоверии и старообрядчестве (The Holy Council of the Orthodox Russian Church 1917–1918 on Edinoverie and Old Belief). Moscow: Spasskoe Delo. 2023. p. 256. ISBN 978-5-6047870-6-9.
