= Platon Levshin =

Metropolitan of Moscow from 1775 to 1812

- Metropolitan and archbishop of Moscow
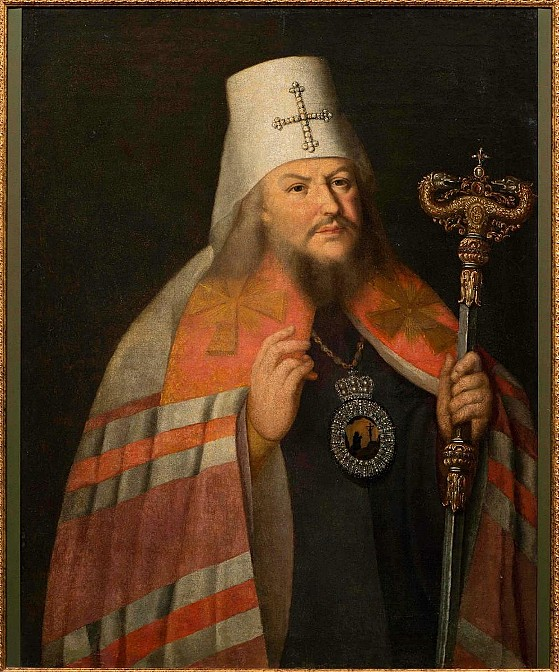
- Plato II by an unknown painter, 1780–1790
- Church: Russian Orthodox Church
- See: Moscow
- Installed: 1775
- Term ended: 1812
- Predecessor: Samoel of Krutitsy
- Successor: Avgustin, Metropolitan of Moscow

Personal details
- Born: 29 June 1737
- Died: 11 November 1812 (aged 75)

Plato II or Platon II (29 June 1737 – 11 November 1812) was the Metropolitan of Moscow from 1775 to 1812. He personifies the Age of Enlightenment in the Russian Orthodox Church.

He was born at Chashnikovo near Moscow as Platon Levshin (Russian: Платон Левшин) in the family of a psalmodist, and was educated at the seminary and the Slavic Greek Latin Academy of Moscow. In 1757 he was appointed instructor in Greek and rhetoric at the latter institution, and became distinguished as a pulpit orator. Within the year he was called to be an instructor in rhetoric at the Troitse-Sergiyeva Lavra near Moscow. Here he became a monk, adopting the name of Platon, and in 1761 was made rector of the seminary of the monastery. A sermon preached by him in October 1762, produced so favorable an impression on the Empress Catherine II that she summoned him to court to be the religious instructor of the eight-year-old heir apparent, Paul Petrovitch. Here he came into close contact with Voltaire and the Encyclopédistes but without injury either to his faith or his character.

Platon remained at the Russian court, winning the admiration of even Voltaire, until the marriage of the heir apparent to Maria Feodorovna, daughter of Duke Eugene of Württemberg, in 1773. During this time he published, for the use of his royal pupil, his Orthodox Doctrine: or, A short Compend of Christian Theology (Moscow, 1765), in which the influence of Western thought, and even of rationalism, may be distinctly traced. At the same time, Roman Catholic doctrines are mercilessly attacked, while the Lutheran tenet of ubiquity and the Reformed theory of predestination also receive their share of criticism. This catechism was followed, a year later, by the Exhortation of the Orthodox Eastern Catholic Church of Christ to her former Children, now on the Road to Schism, pleading, though with scant success, for lenient treatment of dissenters from the Eastern Orthodox Church.

In 1768 Platon became a member of the Holy Synod, and in 1770 was made bishop of Tver, though he still remained at St. Petersburg, finally being the religious instructor of the new grand duchess. In 1775 he was enthroned archbishop of Moscow, and throughout the reigns of Catherine II, Paul, and Alexander I diligently promoted the religious, moral, intellectual, and material welfare of his archdiocese, maintaining meanwhile an unceasing literary activity.

In 1775 he issued a catechism for the use of the clergy, and in 1776 a short catechism for children, as well as one in the form of a dialogue, while his brief history of the Russian Church (1777) is the first systematic treatise of its kind in the Russian language. In 1787 Platon reluctantly consented to become the metropolitan of Moscow. He visited the city but seldom, however, passing the winter in the Troitsky monastery and the summer in the Pererva Monastery close to Moscow. Here he supervised personally the studies of the seminarians, who included three destined to succeed him as archbishop of Moscow.

Compared to his predecessors, Platon was rather lenient towards the Old Believers and allowed them to establish their first chapels in Moscow, notably the Preobrazhenskoe cemetery. He also formalized the arrangement, known as Edinoverie, earlier introduced by Archbishop Nikephoros of Slaviansk, that allowed Old Believer communities to join the established church, while maintaining their traditional form of worship.

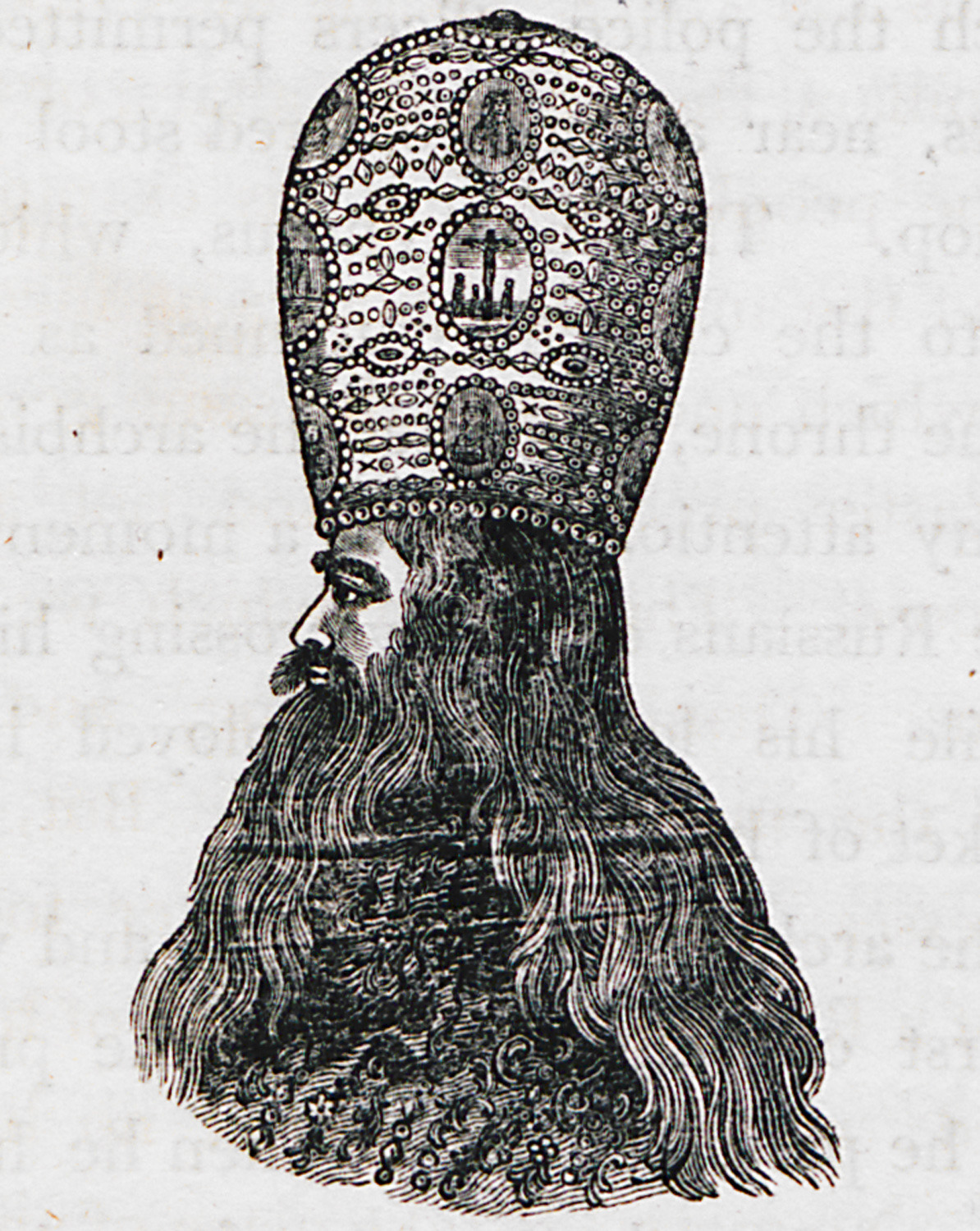
Plato, as sketched by Edward Daniel Clarke on 13 April 1800

It was Platon who crowned both Paul (1797) and Alexander I (1801); but despite his close and cordial relations with the court he preserved to the last his firmness and his independence. Shortly before his death he aided in preparing the way for the foundation of the Russian Bible Society which was established in the year in which he died. Shortly before his death, Platon was evacuated from Moscow, which was about to be surrendered to Napoleon.

The collected works of Platon were published in Moscow in twenty volumes in 1779–1807, the greater portion of these writings being sermons, of which there are about 500. An abridged English translation of Platon's catechism was prepared from a Greek version of the Russian original (London, 1867), and his sermon preached at the request of the empress to celebrate the victory of Chesma also appeared in English (London, 1770).

== Notes ==
Eastern Orthodox Church titles
Preceded by Samoel of Krutitsy	Metropolitan of Moscow; 1775–1812	Succeeded by Augustine (Vinogradsky)
