= Nikephoros Theotokis =

Greek scholar and theologian (1731–1800)

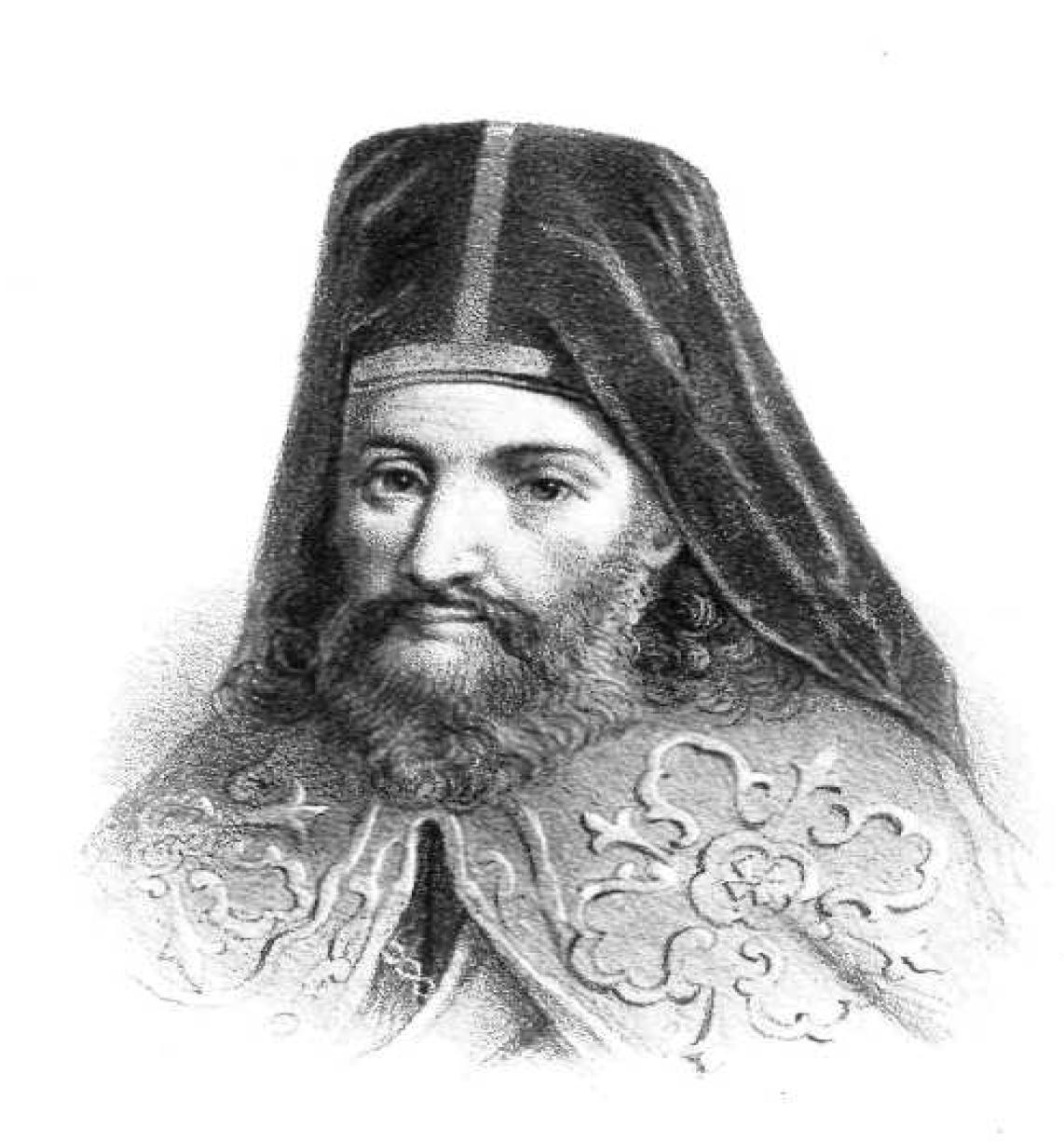
Nikephoros Theotokis

Nikephoros Theotokis or Nikiforos Theotokis (Greek: Νικηφόρος Θεοτόκης; Russian: Никифор Феотоки or Никифор Феотокис; 1731–1800) was a Greek scholar and theologian, who became an archbishop in the southern provinces of the Russian Empire. A polymath, he is respected by the Greek Orthodox church as one of the "teachers of the nation".

== Life and work in Greece and Western Europe ==
Born in the Greek Island of Corfu (then a possession of Republic of Venice), Nikephoros studied in Italian universities of Bologna and Padua.

In 1748, he returned to Corfu to join the Church as a monk, reaching the rank of hieromonk in 1754. However, he was more interested in educating the youth of his country than in church services, and by 1758 he was able to set up his own school in Corfu, the first school on the island where a range of subjects were taught: Greek and Italian literature, grammar, geography, rhetorics, physics and mathematics, philosophy. He acquired some renown as a preacher at the local church of John the Baptist and an author of textbooks on physics and mathematics.

Nikephoros' achievements were noticed by Ecumenical Patriarch Samuel I Chatzeres, who appointed him as the preacher at Constantinople's main church in 1765. However, Nikephoros did not stay very long in Constantinople; he divided much of his time over the next decade between Leipzig, where he published his Physics, and Jassy.

== Career in the Russian Empire ==
During the reign of the Russian Empress Catherine II, a significant number of Greek professionals were invited to come to her empire to help in the administration of the recently conquered lands of Novorossiya ("New Russia") on the north shore of the Black Sea (today's southern Ukraine). In 1776, Nikephoros came to the Russian Empire as well, invited by a fellow Corfiot, Eugenios Voulgaris, who had recently been appointed the Archbishop of Slaviansk and Kherson.

Nikephoros joined Eugenios at the diocese, which covered much of the south-central Ukraine; its seat was actually located in Poltava (Holy Cross Exaltation Monastery), and remained there even after the diocese was later renamed to that of Yekaterinoslav. Eugenios groomed the younger theologian as his successor, and Nikephoros indeed replaced Eugenios when the latter retired in 1779. Later on, in 1786, Nikephoros was transferred to Astrakhan, where he served as the Archbishop of Astrakhan and Stavropol.

Besides his scholarly and theological work, Nikephoros is known for his polemics against dissenter religious groups, such as the Old Believers and the Spiritual Christians. Disappointed with the low success of the propaganda and enforcement approaches intended to make the Old Believers abandon their rites and join the established church, Nikephoros, beginning in the summer of 1780, started to reach out to the Old Believer communities. He offered to legalize their churches and their form of worship, as long as they accepted the authority of the official church. After a number of Old Believer communities in Ukraine and southern Russia accepted such arrangements over the next two decades, such arrangements were adopted nationwide, under the name of Edinoverie ("Unity in Faith").

Nikephoros is credited by some scholars with coining the term "Doukhobor" to refer to Spiritual Christians around 1786, although others ascribe it to his successor at the Poltava chair, Archbishop Ambrosius.

== Retirement and death ==
Nikephoros retired from his archbishop position on June 15, 1792, due to ill health. The Holy Synod appointed him the abbot of the small Danilov Monastery of the Holy Trinity in Pereslavl-Zalessky. Instead of going to the rural Pereslavl, the retired archbishop requested to be left in Moscow, and on September 29, 1792, he was appointed the abbot of Moscow's Danilov Monastery. Nikephoros and spent the rest of his days there, presiding over the monastery's small staff (12 monks and 8 employees, according to the official budget), and continuing his literary work.

The retired archbishop died in 1800 in Moscow and was buried in the monastery's cemetery. His gravestone was destroyed in the 1930s, along with the rest of the cemetery. As of 2006, the monastery reported having approximately determined the location of the grave (based on old records), and planning archaeological excavations in the area.

== Commemoration ==
The main shopping street in the City of Corfu, Nikiforou Theotoki, is named after him.
