= Nikolay Kapterev =

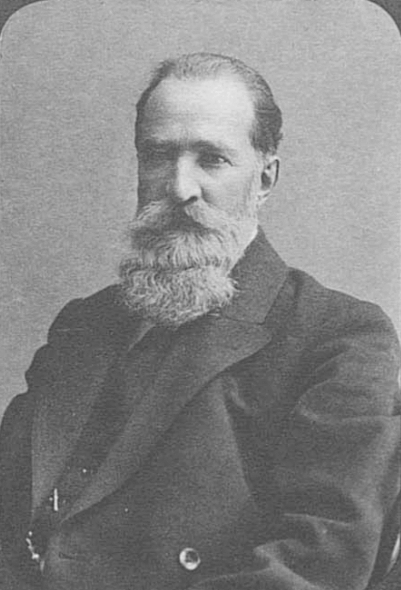
Nikolay Kapterev

Nikolai Fyodorovich Kapterev (Russian: Никола́й Фёдорович Ка́птерев; 8 July 1847 – 31 December 1917) was a church historian, professor at the Church Academy, and corresponding member of the Imperial Academy of Sciences. He is especially known for his publications refuting the theory of the Russian State Church regarding the causes of the Schism of 1666–67. Many of his works are being referred to by the Old Believers when explaining and defending their point of view of the Schism in the Russian Orthodox Church.

== Education ==
Nikolai F. Kapterev started his study at the Church Institute of Zvenigorod and continued his studies at the Vnifansky Church Academy. At this Academy, he took his first degree after having written a thesis on worldly assistants of Archbishops in ancient Russia. Then he was employed as a teacher at the history department of the Moscow Church Academy. At this time he did intensive research work in archives.

In 1883 he started publishing his monography "The character of Russia's relationship with the orthodox East in the 16th and 17th century." In fact, he planned to write his second thesis on this subject. In this monography the author, referring to this elaborate research in archives, came to the conclusion that "the Russians... had... reasons to have a suspicious attitude towards the Greek piety of that time and even to Greek Orthodoxy itself" and that "Patriarch Nikon should not have had so much faith in the Greek who arrived to Moscow and who advised him to correct our old rites and books." For that time, this was a sensational statement to make. Only after interference of Ioaniky, the metropolite of Moscow, Kapterev's monography could be published. Kapterev was granted a Doctor's degree, and in 1885 his monography was published in book form. Professor N.I. Subbotin (1827–1905), a defender of the "official" Russian Orthodoxy, informed the Chairman of the Holy Synod, K.P. Pobedonostsev, against Kapterev and his publication and his Doctor's degree was cancelled by the Holy Synod.

In 1887 Kapterev started publishing "Patriarch Nikon as a Church reformer and his opponents" in the "Orthodox Digest." These publications met with fierce attacks of Prof. Subbotin, which were refuted by Kapterev, who pointed out many errors and deliberate falsities in Subbotin's argumentation. Kapterev tried to take his Doctor's degree, presenting this publication as a thesis, but this was declined by the Holy Synod. This may become understandable, given the fact that Kapterev actually destroyed the basis of the theory on the Schism of 1666-67, held by the official Russian Orthodox Church. He proved that the rites, anathemized as a result of the Church reforms, such as the sign of the Cross with two fingers, the twice hallelujah, etc.), were in fact rites of the ancient universal Christian Church and that the new rites (the sign of the Cross with three fingers, thrice hallelujah, etc.) appeared among the Greek in the 15th-16th century.

== Career ==
In Russian academic circles, the scholarly achievements of Kapterev were highly esteemed; in 1888 was awarded with the Small Uvarov Prize of the Imperial Academy of Sciences for his "The character of Russia's relationship with the orthodox East in the 16th and 17th century." At the same time there appeared other publications, developing Kapterev's scholarship on Russian Church history. In 1891 he published "The relationship of Dosifei, Patriarch of Jerusalem, with the Russian government," for which he was finally granted a Doctor's degree.

In 1896 he was granted the degree of "Ordinary Professor," in 1898 he became "Meritorious Professor." After the Bill of 1905, many publications were issued which until then had not passed censorship. In 1906 Kapterev published "The Czar and the Moscow Councils of the 16th and 17th century," in 1909-1912 followed a fundamental investigation in two volumes "Patriarch Nikon and Czar Aleksei Mikhailovich," in which Kapterev points out the causes having led to the Church reforms. This publication was met with great appreciation by the progressive part of Russian society. In 1910 Kapterev was elected Corresponding Member of the Imperial Academy of Sciences.

Kapterev was also politically active: from 1912 till 1917 he was a member of the State Duma as a deputy of a progressive party.

In spite of some accusations of partiality, Kapterev did not belong to any Old Believer's church of denomination. In fact, the Old Believers do not agree with all of Kapterev's conclusions, especially those concerning Archpriest Avvakum, towards Kapterev had a rather negative attitude.

== Sources and references ==
- Вургафт С.Г., Ушаков И.А. Старообрядчество. Лица, события, предметы и символы. Опыт энциклопедического словаря, Москва 1996 / Vurgaft S.G., Ušakov I.A. Old Believers. Persons, Events, Objects and Symbols. Attempt to an Encyclopedian Dictionary. Moscow, 1996
- Каптерев Н.Ф. Патриарх Никон и его противники в деле исправления церковныx обрядов, Москва 1913 / Kapterev N.F. "Patriarch Nikon and his opponents in the correction of church rituals", Moscow 1913
- Каптерев Н.Ф. Характер отношений России к православному востоку в XVI и XVII вв., Москва 1914/Kapterev N.F. Character of the Relationships between Russia and the Orthodox East in the 16th and 17th centuries, Moscow 1914
