= Pugachev (disambiguation) =

Pugachyov is a town in Saratov Oblast, Russia.

Pugachyov (Russian: Пугачёв) may also refer to:

- Pugachev (surname)
- Pugachev (1937 film), a Soviet historical drama film depicting the life of Yemelyan Pugachev
- Pugachev (1978 film), a Soviet historical drama film depicting the life of Yemelyan Pugachev
- Pugachyov (air base), an air base located near the town of Pugachyov
- Pugachev's Cobra, an aerobatic maneuver named after the pilot Viktor Pugachev
