= Upper Saviour–Transfiguration Monastery =

18th–20th-century Old Believer male monastery in Pugachyov

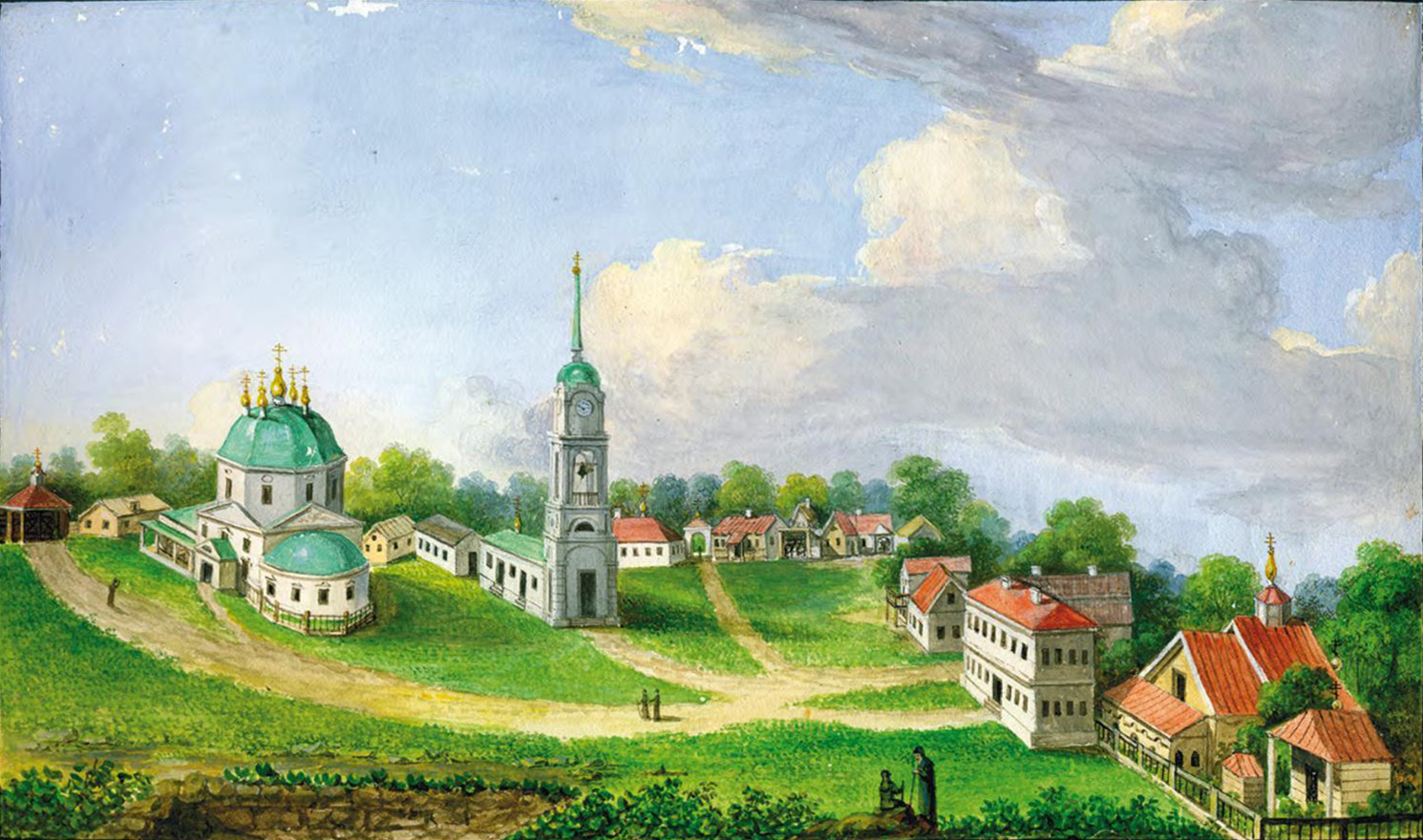
- Upper Saviour–Transfiguration Monastery in the mid-19th century
- Interactive map of Upper Saviour–Transfiguration Monastery

Monastery information
- Denomination: Old Believers → Edinoverie
- Established: 1760s or 1770s
- Disestablished: 26 January 1918

Architecture
- Status: Dissolved

Site
- Location: Nikolayevsk
- Country: Russian Empire
- Coordinates: 52°2′51″N 48°55′7″E

Upper Saviour–Transfiguration Monastery (later known as Upper Dormition Edinoverie Monastery for Men; Russian: Верхний Спасо-Преображенский монастырь) was from the 18th to the early 20th century an Old Believer (later Edinoverie) male monastery, close to the town of Nikolayevsk (now Pugachyov) in Saratov Oblast.

It was founded as an Old Believer monastery, and soon became an all-Russian spiritual centre of the Old Believer movement, possessing wealth comparable to the largest Orthodox monasteries. Among the Irgiz monasteries, it maintained its independence the longest, but in 1841 was converted to Edinoverie. In that capacity it continued to operate until the establishment of Soviet power in the region, after which it was closed.

== The Old Believers' arrival at Irgiz ==
The Bolshoy and Maly Irgiz rivers' environs were places of Old Believers settlements since the early 18th century, despite the constant threat of nomadic raids. In 1727, Archbishop of Kazan Sylvester reported to the Holy Synod that "along the river Kirghiz (Irgiz), from the upper towns and districts, schismatics were living in great numbers, fleeing from investigation, with wives and children". The authorities periodically conducted searches for such settlers using military detachments, but despite such persecutions the region continued to attract more settlers. By the 1760s, "more than a thousand Russian subjects" were living in the area. A number of slobodas sprang up.

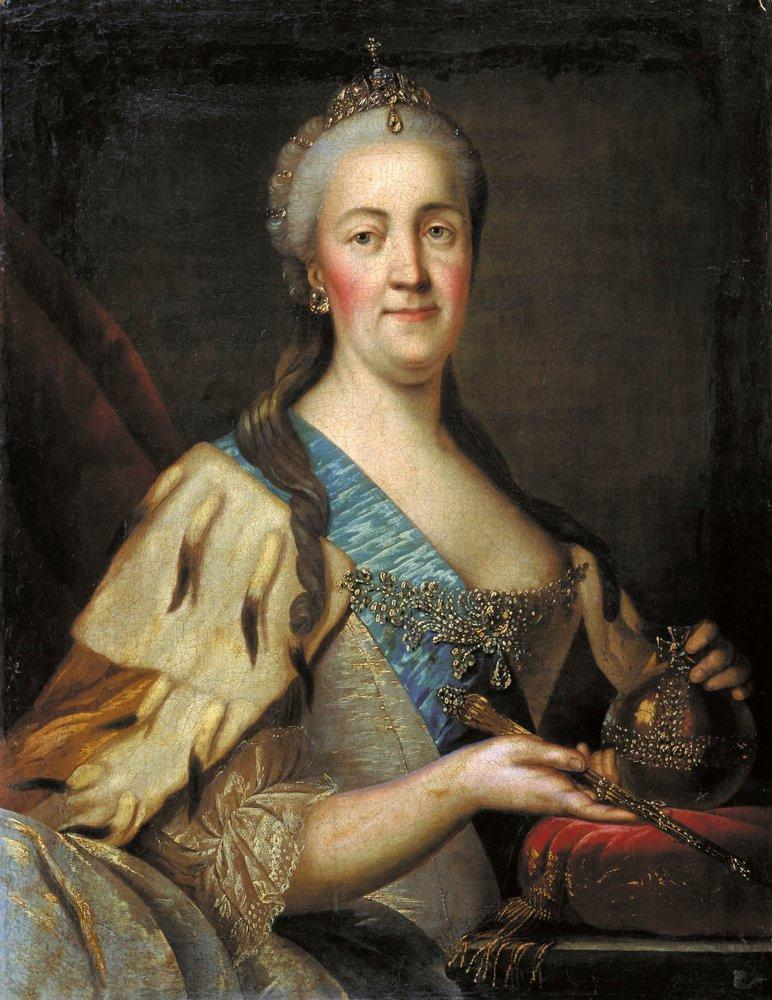
Catherine II

Almost immediately after his accession, Emperor Peter III sent to the Senate for consideration a decree permitting all Old Believers who had previously fled abroad to return to Russia freely, with the right of freedom of worship. G. R. Derzhavin supposed that such a decree came about under the influence of a proposal submitted by Ivan Serebryakov, a peasant from one of the Old Believer centres, the village of Malykovka, concerning the settlement of the sparsely populated lands along the Irgiz by Old Believer migrants from Poland. Catherine II in December 1762 confirmed the earlier decree, additionally promising settlers exemption from taxes for six years and grants of land. The decree became the principal source for the colonisation of the Saratov Region in the 18th century – according to Archbishop Filaret, in 1763 alone some 20,000 people migrated from the Polish sloboda of Vetka, which had long been an Old Believer centre, to the Irgiz. Together with the migrants from Europe, settlers from the interior of Russia also began quietly making their way to the Irgiz, and some of them also managed to obtain land grants. Soon several Old Believer monasteries appeared in the Irgiz slobodas, founded by emigrants from Poland.

== History of the Old Believer Monastery ==
=== Foundation ===
The exact date of the monastery's foundation is unknown. Ivan Dobrotvorsky and Nikolai Sokolov, scholars of the history of schism in Saratov Province, hold that the skete was founded in 1762. The same year appears in the collected works of former Saratov Bishop Iakov (Vecherkov), On the Schism of the Fugitive Priest Sect in Saratov Province, and in the Statistical Description of Monasteries compiled in 1827.

However, as early as the beginning of the 19th century, the Saratov governor Pyotr Belyakov noted that dating the monastery's foundation to 1762 was mistaken, pointing out that the imperial decree was issued only on 14 December, and that it would have been simply impossible to travel from Poland to the distant Irgiz in the remaining two weeks. Belyakov placed the time of the monasteries' foundation in the mid-1770s, which is indirectly confirmed by the absence of the Irgiz monasteries from the lists of schismatics in the province who paid the double poll tax in 1778. Moreover, since under Catherine II's decree the tax exemption was granted for six years, the monasteries could not have been founded before 1772.

Contemporary Russian scholar S. P. Polozov believes that the monastery was founded somewhat later than 1762, while another contemporary researcher, A. Naumlyuk, holds that the monastery was founded in 1764, a view echoed by yet another historian, Irina Polozova.

The founder is considered to be Isaakiy, a native of the Polish sloboda of Vetka, together with a brotherhood of 11 monks and 14 novices. They settled in a picturesque location on the left bank of the Irgiz River, on a peninsula between the river and Lake Kalach. When it was established, Isaakiy's skete lay about eight versts from the future centre of Nikolayevsky Uyezd, the sloboda of Mechetnaya (now Pugachyov).

=== Early years ===
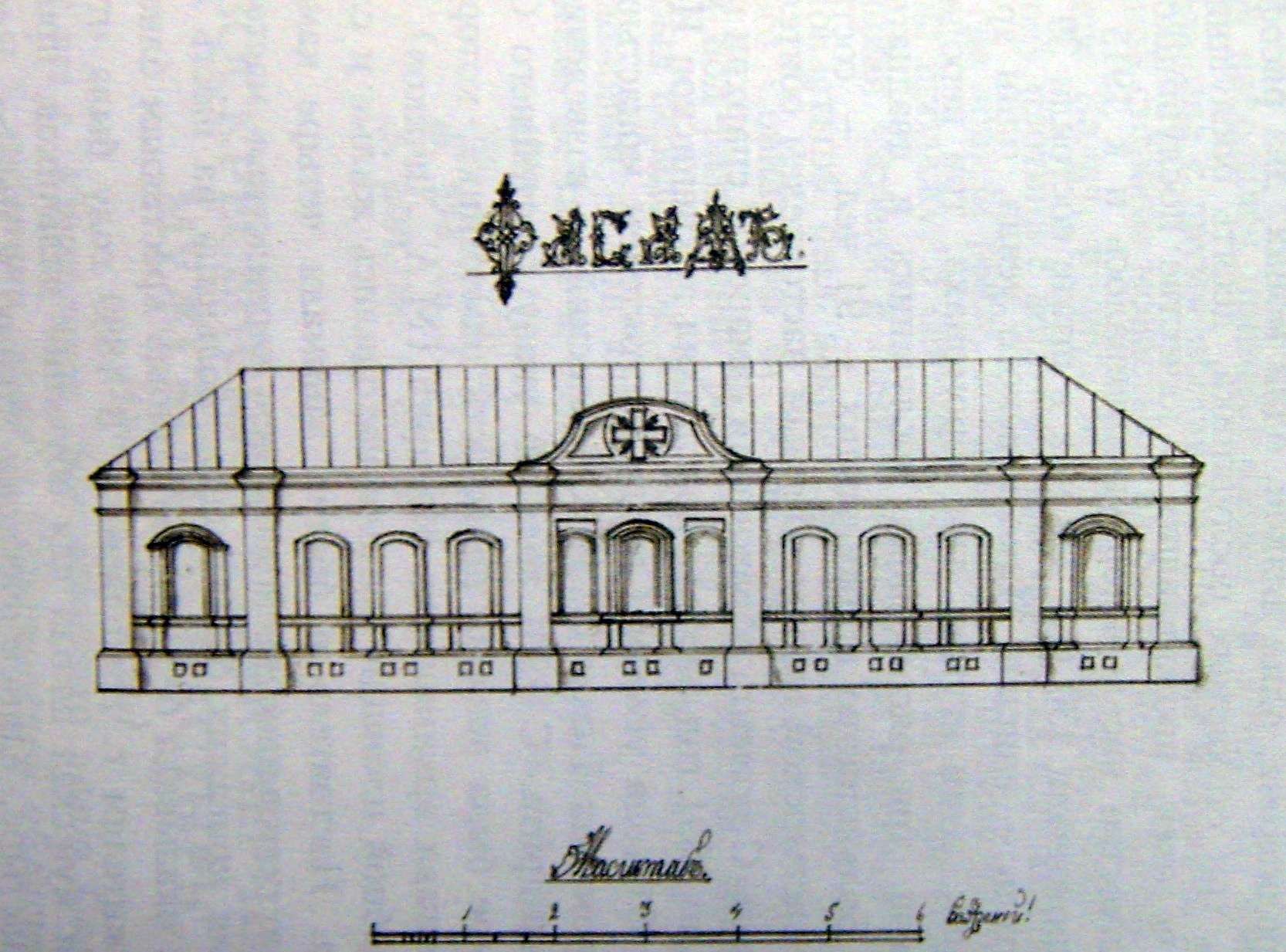
Design of the facade of one of the buildings of the Upper Saviour–Transfiguration Monastery

For a long time the monastery preserved the founder Isaakiy's own holograph will, in which he urged his brotherhood and future inhabitants of the monastery to observe the ancient faith, to strictly follow the requirements of morality, and to adorn themselves with virtues – only then, he wrote, would the monastery endure long and securely. Isaakiy appears to have been an educated, deeply religious, and strictly moral man, who sincerely believed in the rightness of his convictions and sought to instil them in the souls of the brotherhood under his charge. The monks led a strict ascetic life, which earned them the respect of the local Old Believers. According to the census of 1762–1765, after its foundation, the Isaakiy skete was already home for 37 persons.

Although initially the skete did not differ markedly from the numerous similar ones scattered throughout Saratov Governorate, the inhabitants of the monastery, believing that the freedom of worship granted them by the imperial decree also extended to the construction of chapels and churches, set about building ecclesiastical structures, which noticeably increased the monastery's influence on the spiritual life of the region. In 1764 a chapel was built in the monastery in the name of the Intercession of the Most Holy Theotokos. Metropolitan Macarius, in his work History of the Russian Schism Known as Old Belief, which had several editions, wrote that the first chapel appeared in the monastery only in 1770, but already on 21 July 1768 it was discussed in a communication from the Holy Synod to the Senate, which allows his assertion to be considered erroneous. From this time began the monastery's public activity in the spiritual guidance of the Old Believer flock. Laypeople approached the monastery for teachings and explanations of Scripture, for the performance of rites; it became the local spiritual centre and developed rapidly. The fame of the Irgiz hermits' sacredness grew quickly. Around 1774, a women's skete was founded near the men's monastery, which subsequently developed into the Upper-Pokrovsky Monastery.

=== Flourishing ===
The monastery's flourishing era is linked with the name of its second superior, Sergiy (Yurshev). He was the son of a Moscow merchant, a well-known Old Believer, and had fled persecution to Poland. In 1776, Sergiy took advantage of Catherine II's decree permitting schismatics to return to Russia. When crossing the border he identified himself as a native Russian who supposedly did not remember where he had been born or who had brought him to Poland.

In that same year, 1776, Sergiy appeared at Isaakiy's skete, where he soon gained the respect of the monastery's inhabitants, standing out among them as a native of Moscow, the son of a well-known schismatic, and a man of sober judgement, literate and widely read. There was in general a great shortage of educated people in the monastery. Thus during the Pugachev's Rebellion one of the elders said of educated persons in the monastery: "there are none such here; some twenty had gathered, but they all scattered on account of the squad of investigators".

A year after his arrival, Sergiy was playing an important role in the monastery's administration. Isaakiy even sent him to Moscow to establish connections between the Irgiz and Moscow Old Believers. Sergiy did not return from Moscow alone: he persuaded Mikhail Kalmyk, then regarded as the supreme father of the popovtsy group, to give him the hierodeacon Ieronimus to perform sacrifices needed by all the Old Believers of the Irgiz, where there had been no priests for two years.

In 1780, Isaakiy – the skete's founder and superior – died. Before his death he pointed to Sergiy as his successor, with which the brotherhood agreed: it was to Sergiy's name that they attached their hopes, and no one in the monastery could compare with him in fame. However, Sergiy reluctantly accepted the position offered, excusing himself on grounds of youth and inexperience. How sincere his excuses were is not known, but on 3 May 1780 the following document was drawn up by the skete's inhabitants:

By the will and grace of God the Father Almighty, we, the assembled brotherhood of the Upper Isaakiy Skete, gathered here for the election of a superior for our monastery, have chosen the monk Sergiy by our full, common, brotherly counsel, to govern all monastic needs, both spiritual and temporal. Above all, let the superior, monk Sergiy, take care of the common house of prayer, ensuring that divine service is never lacking. Let all of us in the brotherhood who are under his authority render him obedience in all God-pleasing matters without contradiction. Let the superior guide us in a fatherly manner and with righteousness. Let the superior not determine any matter pertaining to the monastery alone, but consult the treasurer. If a significant matter arises that affects the entire monastery and all the brotherhood, let it be presented to the assembled brotherhood for deliberation in a spirit of humility.

In addition, the superior used to oversee compliance with the monastic rule according to the precept of Macarius, Metropolitan of Moscow, so that "the elders should not keep or drink intoxicating and strong wine; lest disorder take root in the monastery, and from disorder every evil thing arise, that is, the ruin of patristic and monastic life".

Sergiy started to fulfill the brotherhood's charge: he drew up a rule of communal life and introduced a common refectory meal. His rule is not known to historians, but the rule of the Lower-Resurrection Monastery has survived, and is known to have been modelled on the rule of the Upper Dormition Monastery.

1. Have 12 people from the brethren for counsel, without which no matters are to be done.
2. Have a collection box in the churches for donations, which go exclusively to the priests.
3. If any of the brethren becomes guilty, feed him, do not deprive him of will, but punish only by determination with counsel.
4. All sums of offerings go to the abbot, but the string-bound books of income and expenditure are checked by the elders.
5. For receiving offerings in letters, appoint a special agent who will receive them, record them in books, hand them to the abbot, and he hands them to the treasurer or church warden.
6. Do not accept those coming on pilgrimage or for living without the Council under any circumstances.
7. For visitors, the treasurer allocates everything necessary.
8. The abbot is not to travel anywhere arbitrarily without the Council and the treasurer.
9. Expenditure of money by the abbot only after agreement of the Council and the treasurer.
10. If any of the brethren is guilty of a crime, hand him over to the public offices at the desire of the whole brethren.
11. Do not keep excess livestock, but for their care keep the corresponding number of workers.
12. If the abbot does not fulfill it, the Council reports it to the other abbots; if the abbot does not submit, a new one is elected.

Soon, through his connections with wealthy Old Believer merchants from Moscow and the Volga region, and through his renown, Sergiy managed also to obtain permission from the local authorities to construct a permanent church, in defiance of the existing legislation of the Russian Empire, which forbade Old Believers from building churches. An altar was added to the existing chapel, and the new church was consecrated in the name of the Presentation of the Most Holy Theotokos at the Temple.

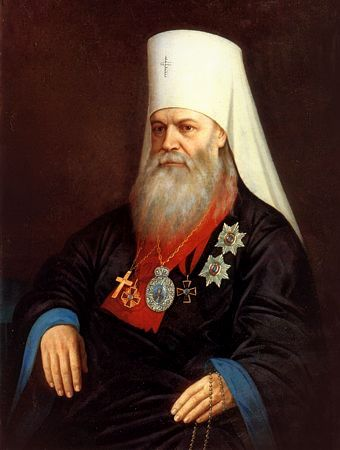
Metropolitan Macarius (Bulgakov)

The details of this event are described in the work of Metropolitan Macarius, which is not distinguished by the reliability of its sources. According to Macarius, the matter unfolded as follows: Sergiy first petitioned the authorities for permission to repair the chapel after a fire. After the permission, he built a new five-domed church with a bell tower, still calling it a chapel, and submitted a fresh petition: to permit the installation in this chapel of a temporary canvas church he had brought from abroad, so as to be able to celebrate several liturgies and replenish the reserves of the holy gifts. A hierodeacon had already appeared in the monastery some years earlier through Sergiy's efforts. Permission was granted again, but the church proved to be not temporary but permanent.

On the question of the existence and origin of the temporary church, historians are not in agreement. According to the generally accepted view, Sergiy managed to bring a portable folding church from Poland into Russia, having prudently declared it in his passport, and this was in large measure what enabled him to establish a church in the monastery. Macarius, however, believed that instead of a church, Sergiy had brought across the border an empty canvas wound around sticks. In his opinion, Sergiy had from the outset set himself the goal of becoming the head of the entire Irgiz community, and it was to this end that he had devised such a far-reaching plan. However, Nikolai Sokolov, in his work Schism in the Saratov Region, describing Metropolitan Macarius's version of events, notes that such far-sighted plans for the seizure of power on the Irgiz as Macarius attributes to Sergiy are utterly at odds with the subsequent course of his life.

One way or another, the monastery acquired its first fully functioning church, the celebration of the divine liturgy was opened in the monastery, and the skete received the name of the Upper Monastery. This marked the beginning of the flourishing of the Irgiz monasteries. News of the formal permission for divine service on the Irgiz spread rapidly throughout the country, and the monastery was soon visited by great numbers of pilgrims from every corner of Russia – the Urals, the Don, the Volga, Siberia, Saint Petersburg. Some came to venerate holy sites, believing in the widespread legend that the sites for the construction of monasteries on the Irgiz had been divinely indicated, and that the incorrupt relics of holy ascetics rested there. Others came for the holy gifts. Before long the cramped Presentation Church could no longer accommodate all those who wished to attend, and the hierodeacon Ieronimus could no longer perform all the necessary rites. The question of increasing the number of priests and of constructing a new church became urgent.

Sergiy wrote a tract entitled Investigative Discourse, in which he argued that without the re-anointing it was entirely impossible to receive priests who had been defiled by "baptism by affusion". But to correct priests and cleanse them from defilement through chrismation was only possible where there was a true church and true chrism. After the secession from the fugitive priestly faction of Starodubye, the church and chrism existed in only one place: the Upper Monastery. Sergiy had disguised this idea of his rather carefully within discourses and references to canonical rules and patristic regulations. Some Old Believers did not perceive the hidden meaning of the tract; others perceived it but chose not to accept it.

The first to express dissatisfaction with such an elevation of Sergiy was Antony, the superior of the neighbouring Filaretov skete. He declared that in cases of urgent necessity, Old Believers could receive Orthodox priests without additional re-anointing, and backed his words with action, admitting into the monastery without correction a certain priest Vasily. Sergiy responded by convening a council, which took place on 2 August 1782 at the church of the Most Honourable and Glorious Presentation of the Mother of God at the Temple. The council ended inconclusively; all sides maintained their positions.

On 5 March 1783 a full general assembly was again convened at the Upper Monastery. This time the majority spoke in favour of Sergiy, adopting and confirming the rules of re-anointing established by the council of 1780 at the Rogozhskoye Cemetery in Moscow.

Meanwhile, thanks to the non-interference of the civil authorities and generous donations from all over Russia, a new church was built in the monastery. On 19 December 1783 it was consecrated in the name of the Dormition of the Mother of God; the monastery henceforth became known as the Upper Dormition Monastery. For the solemn consecration ceremony of a new Old Believer church – an event so rare in the Russian Empire – a great many of the faithful arrived, mainly merchants from Saratov, Volsk, and Khvalynsk. On that same day Sergiy convened a "general public assembly" at the monastery, proposing to those present that the question of re-anointing be finally resolved one way or another.

The general public assembly adopted a "holy-canonical examination and explanatory general resolution for the holy church and all Christendom":

1. That the holy Christian church have in itself holy-legal every determination in all things, according to the holy-apostolic and holy-patristic holy rules binding and supervisory;
2. That it use them each in its time, and not as some wanderers from the holy church used holy-apostolic and holy-patristic traditions not in their time, from which they wandered and for which they received a curse from the holy church, and not a blessing;
3. That it not accept those baptized by Little Russian affusion and the ordination proceeding from affusionists and to sacred ministry by no means admit such, and those priests accepted from affusionists are left in their places and consigned to silence;
4. That nowhere newly accept arriving priests except at the holy church, for better legal consideration in all things;
5. When, wherever due to some necessary need, some newly arrived priest is accepted, then speedily give notice from that place to the holy church, for union-loving submission to the holy church.

As the holy church for Old Believers existed in only one place in Russia, such a resolution in effect indefinitely secured for the Upper-Dormition Monastery the privilege of receiving fugitive priests, and placed Sergiy at the head of the entire fugitive priestly faction. The signatures on the document show that the Upper Monastery had four priests, one hieromonk, one hierodeacon and one deacon by this time, enabling them to perform divine services with full solemnity.

Not all Old Believer communities in Russia accepted the council's resolution immediately, however, and Sergiy had to write a new work, A Discourse with Those Who Doubt the Holy Church and Orthodox Priesthood. In it he again defended the propositions of his earlier writings: that baptism by affusion was the root sore of the Russian church and its chief heresy; that there was now not a single Orthodox bishop in Russia, since some had themselves been baptised by affusion, others had been ordained by those who baptise by affusion, and a third group was in close association with them – including the Georgian bishops, Alexei of Pereyaslavl, and Illarion of Astrakhan. Sergiy wrote that only in the Dormition Irgiz Monastery had apostolic teaching, proper church order, and the corresponding performance of the sacraments been unwaveringly preserved, and therefore only it, only the holy church, had the right "by necessity or by consideration of the times to permit a deviation from the law." He then proceeded to argue in detail, with references to the decisions of early Christian councils, that such a departure from church rules as the reception of a fugitive priest from another church, in contravention of the sixth canon of the Synods of Antioch, was in principle possible and permissible out of necessity.

The Discourse proved effective: the priestly faction submitted, as did the Siberian Old Believers and other doubters, henceforth regarding the canonical church position of the general public assembly of 1783 as binding. The exclusive right of the Irgiz monasteries to correct fugitive priests was no longer challenged; henceforth, fugitive priestly Old Believer communities throughout Russia accepted for the performance of church rites only priests anointed in the Irgiz monasteries. This greatly raised the authority of the monasteries among the Old Believers. Since the time of the secession of Starodubye, authority, supreme leadership, and visible legitimacy had for the first time appeared within the priestly branch of Old Belief. In recognition of these achievements of Sergiy, and of his work in establishing monastic life on the Irgiz, his contemporaries accorded Sergiy the title of "builder" [stroitel], of which he was exceedingly proud.

Meanwhile, the other Irgiz monasteries followed Sergiy's example by adopting rules, beginning construction of churches, and receiving their definitive names after the dedication of their altar: Lower-Resurrection, Middle-Nicholas, and Upper-Dormition. The Irgiz monasteries soon became an all-Russian centre of Old Belief, and the Upper-Dormition was pre-eminent among them. A period of splendour and glory for the Irgiz monasteries had begun. Several scholars compare the influence of the Irgiz monasteries to that of such Orthodox centres as Kiev or Mount Athos. Characters in the novel by P. I. Melnikov speak of the monasteries thus:

As, after the fall of piety in old Rome, Constantinople became the Second Rome, so after the fall of piety on the holy Mount Athos, a second Athos arose on the Irgiz… It was a true kingdom of monks… They lived without care and in abundance in all things…

=== Sergiy's expulsion ===
On 6 July 1786 elections for a new superior were held at the Upper Dormition Monastery, but neither the reason for Sergiy's removal nor the name of his successor is known. In 1790, however, Sergiy was again in the post of superior – on 18 July in that capacity he sent his well-known Questions to Nikephoros Theotokis. By this time Sergiy had probably already conceived of entering into an agreement with the Synodal Church and henceforth receiving priests who were not fugitives but blessed by a bishop. But such a departure from old traditions – the abandonment of the unyielding opinion prevailing among the fugitive priestly community that the Synodal Orthodox Church was heretical – was accepted neither by the monastery's brotherhood, nor by the neighbouring monasteries, nor by the influential Old Believer communities of Volsk. When Sergiy's intentions to convert to Edinoverie became clear, his past merits could not save him, and he was removed from the post of superior, presumably at the end of 1791.

In one of Sergiy's biographies there is information that some monks from the brotherhood even attempted to kill the former superior, but he was saved by the unexpected arrival of a district police officer. The would-be assailants escaped punishment through the bribery of officials by the wealthy Old Believer merchant Rastorguev. However, a year later it became clear that Kirill, who had succeeded Sergiy as superior, was wholly unfit for the post; under him the monastery was effectively plundered, the property of the monastery was openly pillaged, so that within a year the monastery was in a most wretched state. The brotherhood again turned to Sergiy with a request that he take the position of superior. He refused several times but ultimately agreed, "chiefly at the persuasion of the Volsk merchants".

The act of election dated 28 January 1793, witnessed by the district police officer, has survived:

At the general assembly where he was elected anew, the whole brotherhood implored the former builder Sergiy to be our superior on the condition that we all submit to him in obedience as duty and rule enjoin upon monks. For his part, we all pledge to hold him as our foremost pastor and to honour him. Among ourselves, the whole brotherhood is to live in perfect harmony without discord or shameful matters. Above all, none of us, elders or novices, are to engage in drunkenness or keep intoxicating drinks in our cells under any circumstances whatsoever.

Armed with such a document, Sergiy began to rule the monastery, so that within two years the monastery had recovered its former appearance. True, many monks could not endure the strictness of his governance and left the monastery, departing to the Urals or the Don. But in 1795, Sergiy again took up the promotion of Edinoverie and was again removed from the post of superior by resolution of a "full assembly of the monastic and lay communities". His place was taken by a former soldier named Isaakiy, who was illiterate and deaf.

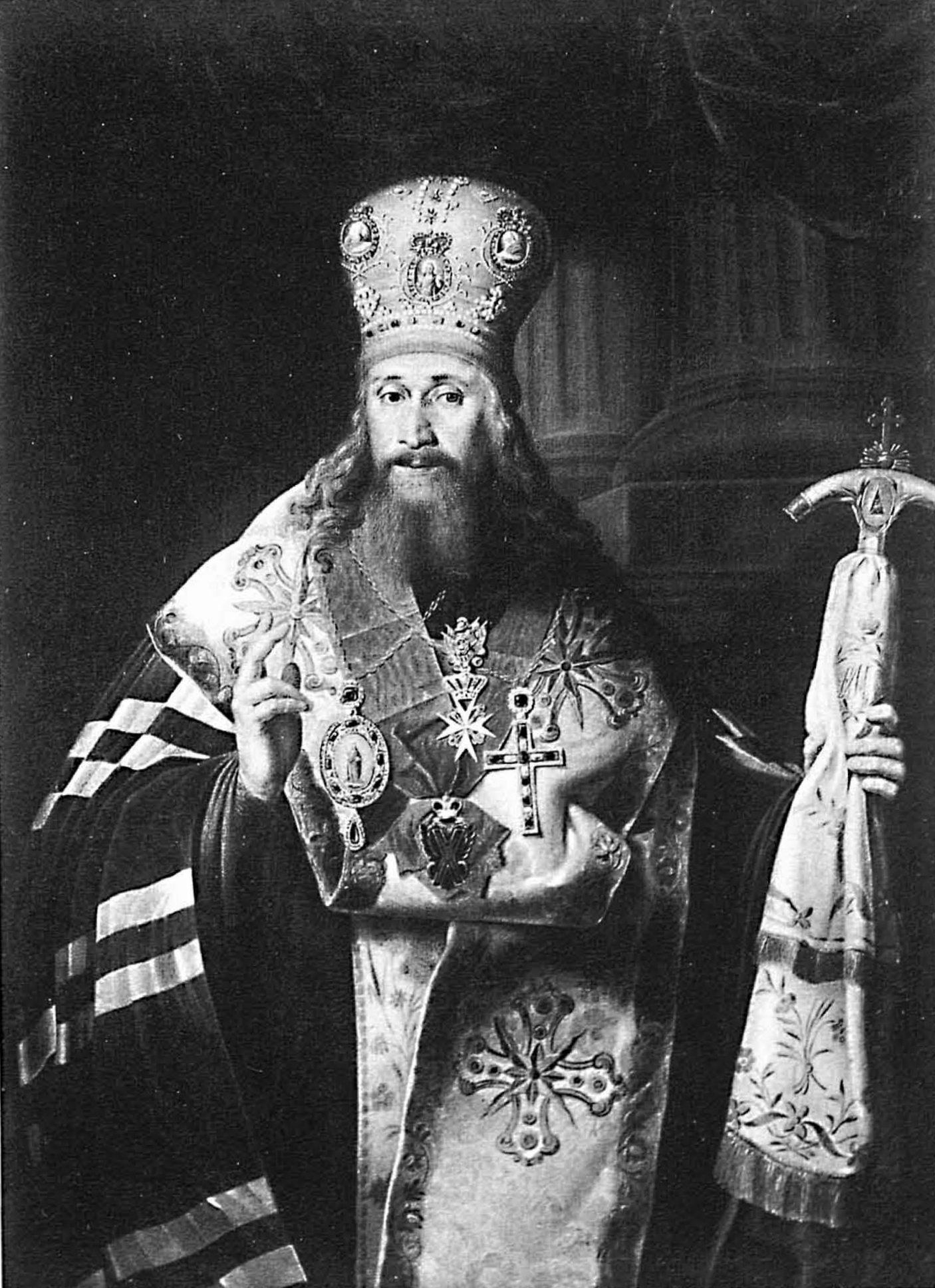
Ambrose

Sergiy, however, did not abandon his attempts to regain power in the monastery. He submitted to the Kazan bishop Ambrose a petition in which, calling himself the builder of the Dormition Irgiz Monastery, he petitioned on behalf of the entire brotherhood for the appointment of an Orthodox priest to the monastery on certain conditions: that it be placed under the jurisdiction of the Kazan Diocese, with permission to conduct divine service according to the old-printed books. Ambrose readily agreed; a petition to the Synod followed, which was satisfied relatively quickly thanks to the assistance of Metropolitan Gabriel and Aleksei Ivanovich Musin-Pushkin. In the highest rescript of 19 June 1796 addressed to the Kazan Archbishop Ambrose, the desired resolution concerning the conversion of the Upper Dormition Monastery to Edinoverie followed.

However, the monastery had no intention of accepting Sergiy as their leader. His novice, who had been sent ahead with news of his imminent arrival, was excommunicated and forbidden to eat, drink or pray with others. He was even given food from separate utensils. The priest who granted the novice forgiveness and cleansing from the defilement of the road upon his arrival was obliged to beg forgiveness from the brotherhood in a hastily devised rite, since he too was considered defiled. A council was convened with elders from neighbouring monasteries in attendance. It was resolved that Sergiy should not only be denied leadership, but also residence in the monastery. The elders also submitted a corresponding declaration to the court.

On 25 October 1796, Sergiy turned for help to the district police officer Pyotr Bezobrazov, requesting an escort to the monastery. In accordance with a decree of the provincial government and an order from the governor, the elders were informed that Sergiy was permitted to return to the monastery. However, pending receipt of special orders, he was enjoined in no way to interfere in the affairs of the monastery. Sergiy requested permission to carry out an inventory of the monastery's property, since monks loyal to him were reporting that it was being pilfered. To this end the district police officer assigned to assist him a noble assessor, Nikiforov, and a registrar, Ufimtsev. On 28 October Sergiy arrived at the monastery. It turned out that a great deal of the monastery's property had indeed gone missing: linen cloth, broadcloth, steel, iron, sheepskin, and other items were unaccounted for to the value of more than 2,000 roubles. However, in direct contravention of the district police officer's orders, having received sizeable bribes, Nikiforov and Ufimtsev refused to inventory the property and departed. Sergiy remained in the monastery, but was admitted neither to the church nor to the cellarium, was given no food at all, and was fed only by his own sister, the nun Aleksandra. From both churches the monks removed to the cellarium the vestments, books, sticharions, candlesticks, and so forth; they locked the churches themselves, held no services, and did not admit Sergiy. The former superior was again obliged to seek help from the authorities. About 20 of his supporters among the brotherhood issued him a written power of attorney to the Kazan bishop requesting the dispatch of hieromonks and hierodeacons, with which Sergiy applied to the Synod.

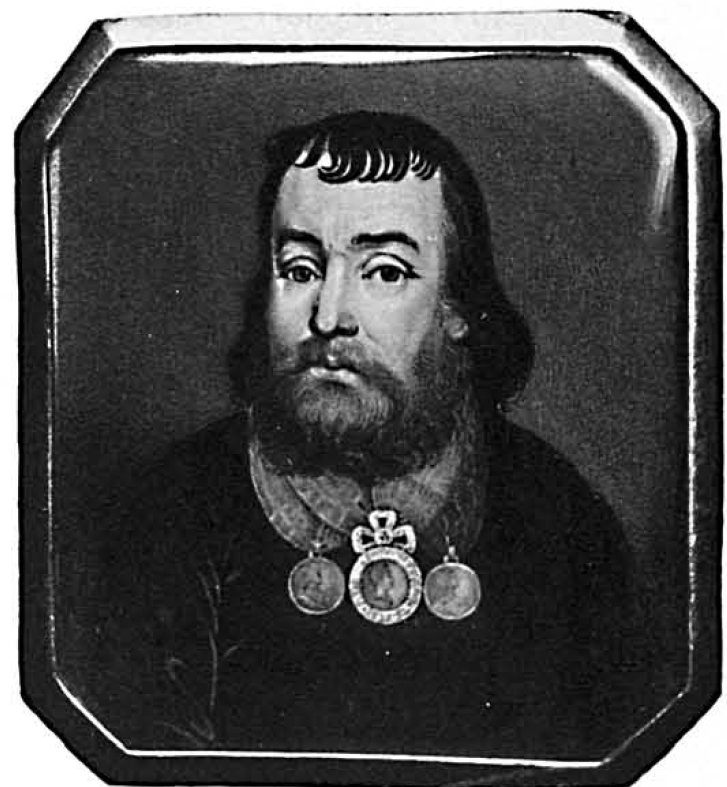
Vasily Zlobin

Sergiy's struggle was doomed to failure: he was now opposed by his former friend, the all-powerful tax farmer Vasily Zlobin, who had earlier supported the idea of conversion to Edinoverie but had now renounced it, remaining faithful to Old Belief. All of Sergiy's support from the supreme hierarchs of the Orthodox Church could avail nothing against the influence of Zlobin's bribes upon the immediate executors of the highest will. All supporters of the former superior were expelled from the monastery. The provincial government counsellor and colonel Aleksandr Ivanchin, sent to the monastery by the governor, stopped on his way at Zlobin's home in Volsk and thereafter had no inclination to assist Sergiy. To the governor's envoy's proposal to receive Sergiy, the brotherhood replied: "we heed neither decree, nor bishop, nor the whole Synod, for we are not elders but peasants: we pay poll taxes, palace duties, recruit levies and all other state burdens; we do not agree to recognise the Great Russian church as Orthodox, nor to pray for the royal family, the Synod, and the diocesan bishop, for they are all heretics." Ivanchin chose not to insist and instead advised Sergiy to leave the monastery. Sergiy was compelled to submit.

=== The Monastery during the reigns of Paul I and Alexander I ===
After the expulsion of Sergiy in 1797, the new spiritual leader of the Irgiz monasteries became the superior of the Lower Resurrection Monastery, Prokhor, who enjoyed great respect in the monasteries as well as the patronage of the authorities. In early 1797, on the instructions of Paul I, who had ascended the throne, the monasteries were visited by the Vladimir governor Pavel Runich, the tsar's trusted representative. Runich was satisfied with what he saw and wrote to Prokhor, with whom he had made friends:

I would be most pleased if, with regard to your own monastery and the other Irgiz monasteries, you would assure the superiors and the brotherhood that they may address their needs to me. Being informed of these needs will put me in a position to provide you and them with the lawful services and assistance I am able to offer.

Runich's services proved useful to the Upper Dormition Monastery more than once. Shortly after Runich's visit to Saratov Province, at his invitation there departed for Saint Petersburg the superior of the Resurrection Monastery and new spiritual leader of all the Irgiz monasteries, Prokhor, together with the elder Iosif from the Upper Dormition Monastery. During the visit they were repeatedly granted audiences by Paul I and had the opportunity to voice their complaints and wishes to him. Paul I treated the Irgiz delegates with great benevolence. On 31 August 1797 a decree followed exempting the monks of the Irgiz monasteries from recruit service, and he also permitted the construction of new churches and cells, effectively legalising the monasteries.

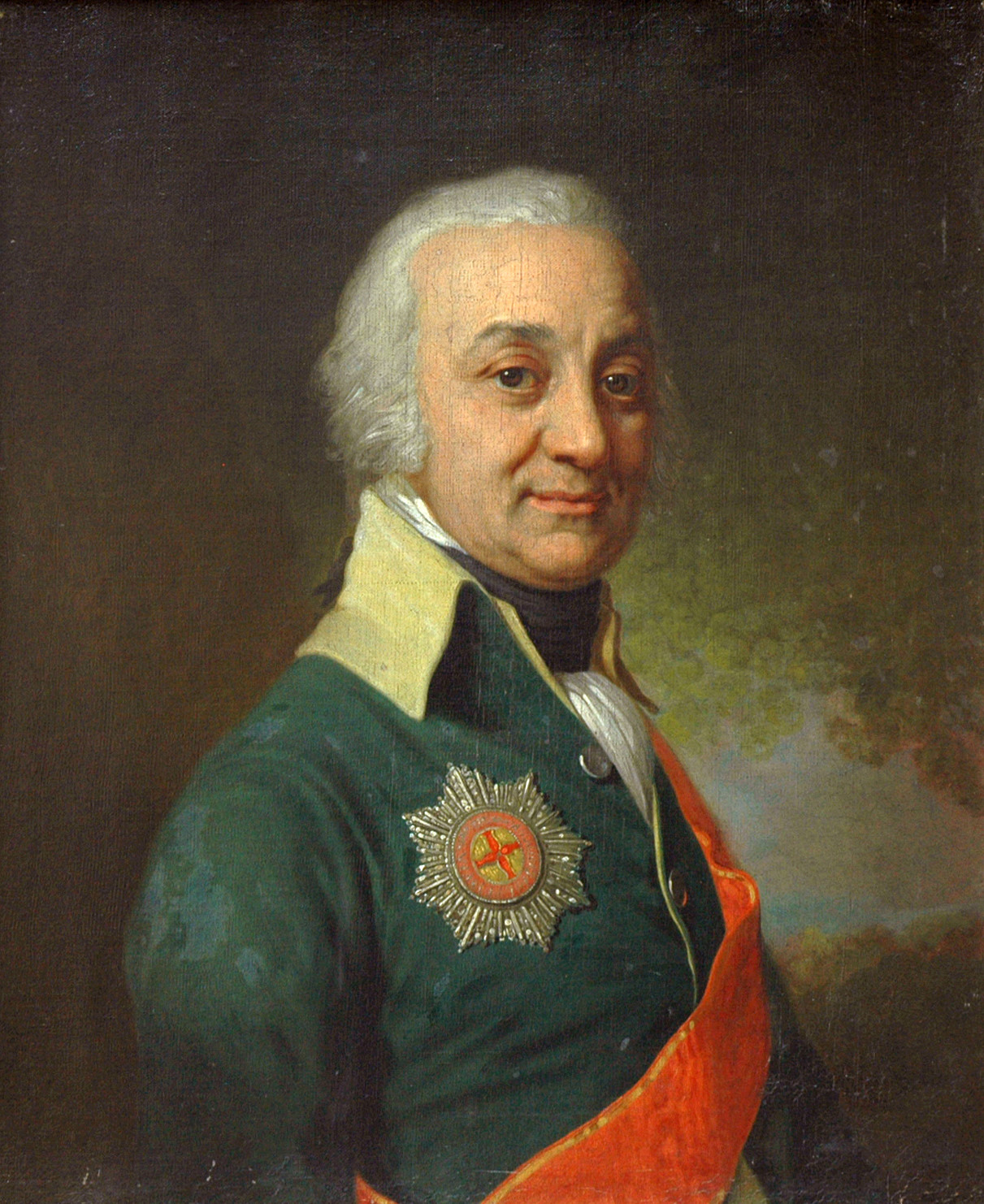
Portrait of Pavel Runich by V. L. Borovikovsky

The monks of the monastery soon had occasion to resort to Runich's help once more. On 7 October 1798 a fire broke out in the monastery. Ignited by an oil lamp, it destroyed both churches along with 47 cells. Isaakiy's successor as superior, the monk Mamont, immediately informed Runich of the disaster through Prokhor; the fire had caused losses to the monastery of up to 100,000 roubles. Runich appealed to the emperor and on 16 November received a rescript: "…concerning the burning of the churches in the Upper Dormition Old Believer Monastery, I have to tell you here that… for the construction of all those burned churches I command the necessary sum of money to be given to you from my treasury." On 18 December the "necessary sum" was fixed at 12,000 roubles, with the remark that this sum should "serve as the limit".

Upon learning of the tsar's favour, the brotherhood set to work. Within a month a small wooden church in the name of the Presentation of the Most Holy Theotokos had been built and consecrated on 10 January 1799 on the antimension that had been saved from the fire. About 60 new cells were built in place of those that had burned. In addition, construction began on a large stone church according to a design that had received the highest approval. A wooden bell tower was also built according to the same design, on which a clock made by Kulibin was installed. From the treasury the monks spent only 6,000 roubles, presumably fearing to demonstrate immoderation.

The new stone church was only ready in 1803. By that time, owing to changes on the throne, the monks did not dare to consecrate the church without special permission. It was again necessary to turn to Runich, at this time the Vyatka governor. He transmitted through Minister of Internal Affairs Kochubey the Old Believers' petition to Alexander I and obtained the necessary permission. Informing the new superior of the monastery, Gavriil, of this on 20 October 1803, Runich added: "After the consecration of the church, do not fail to inform me both of that and of whether it was a priest of one monastery alone or priests of other monasteries too who performed this ceremony." On 21 November the Volsk land court officially notified the brotherhood of the permission. The consecration, however, took place only in mid-1804. The reasons for such a delay are not entirely clear. According to one suggestion, the church was not yet ready, and the petition had simply been initiated in advance, knowing the bureaucratic delays attendant on such applications. According to another, the monastery no longer had an antimension to replace the one that had burned in the Dormition Church. Saratov Bishop Iakov wrote that for a long time they searched for an antimension consecrated in honour of the Dormition, but without success. Prokhor then purchased for 50 roubles a stolen antimension consecrated in honour of the Transfiguration.

On 9 June 1804, the consecration of the new church in the name of the Transfiguration of the Lord took place in the monastery. For the ceremony, from various parts of the country there arrived:

2 hieromonks and 2 hierodeacons, 10 priests, 6 deacons, and Old Believers of various ranks, namely: officers of the Ural Host of staff and company ranks 27; common Cossacks 500; of the Don Host officers 10, common Cossacks 35; Siberian merchants: from Yekaterinburg, 27; from Perm, 30; from Irkutsk, 20; from Kazan, 35; from Samara, 45; from Saratov, 260; from Volsk, 120; from Khvalynsk, 80; from Astrakhan, 30; from various provinces agricultural peasants and persons of other ranks of the male sex, up to 4,000; totalling 5,537 persons.

Such a number of guests clearly demonstrates the enormous influence of the Irgiz monasteries in general, and of the Upper Saviour–Transfiguration Monastery (as it was henceforth called) in particular, on the spiritual life of Russia, constituting a palpable competitor to the official Russian Orthodox Church.

In 1805, at the initiative of Superior Gavriil, a large and solemnly arranged council was held in the monastery to discuss "latter-time circumstances". It appears that within the fugitive priestly community, internal doubts, discord, and the transfer of various community members to other factions had again arisen. In the act drawn up, the Old Believers explicitly stated that many had departed from the old faith, converting to Edinoverie or joining the Nikonians; and that many, without entirely separating, were not observing the regulations of the holy fathers and "maintain communion in eating and drinking, and in prayer with heretics and those who have separated from our Orthodox Church". To counter "the tares of heresy and their viciously gnawing poison", a special conciliar decree was drawn up, which mentioned as if in passing that in some places Old Believers "out of negligence or weakness" had departed from the Irgiz resolutions of 1783 and 1792 in the matter of receiving fugitive priests. N. Sokolov holds that this was the principal reason for convening the council, since this departure, unlike the others, caused the monasteries a noticeable material loss.

Yet despite the possible losses from such instances of disregard for the Irgiz monopoly, the monastery's influence was enormous. The favour of four successive Russian emperors could not fail to affect both the monastery's prosperity and its spiritual influence on the life of Russia. From all over Russia, schismatics came to the monastery bearing precious gifts for their spiritual sanctuary. The monastery in turn actively dispatched Old Believer priests to communities throughout the country. The Irgiz correction of priests operated so intensively that almost annually decrees appeared from the authorities forbidding the admission of fugitive priests to the Irgiz monasteries.

=== New persecutions ===
During the reign of Alexander I, the state and church figures made several attempts to crack down on the Irgiz monasteries, but none of them was particularly persistent and all ended in failure. Periodically, searches were carried out at the monasteries, and new prohibitions were issued against accepting runaway Orthodox priests. In 1826, bell ringing was banned. However, the monastic leadership ignored such demands, and the local authorities took into account the enormous number of Old Believers in the region, including those holding high positions, and did not wish to quarrel with the monastery leadership; the governors Belyakov and Panchulidzev repeatedly invited the abbots for advice and consultations.

Everything changed in 1825–1827, when Emperor Nicholas I ascended to the throne, Bishop Irenaeus (Nestorovich) took the diocesan see, and A. B. Golitsyn assumed the post of governor.

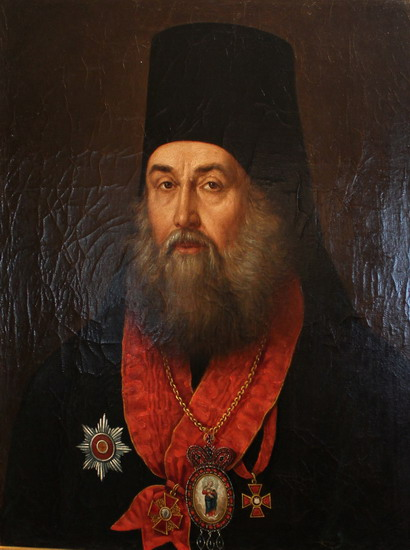
Bishop Irenaeus

In the early years of his reign, Nicholas I did not take a definitive stance on the schism, largely adhering to the policy of his predecessor, Alexander I. Likewise, the new governor expressed no intention that would endanger the communities during his first visit to the monasteries. Although he declined to take the monasteries under his "high patronage", he also took no steps in the opposite direction. Golitsyn wrote to the head of the diocese, Irenaeus, to request his opinion on how to combat the schism. The bishop replied with a lengthy letter setting out his detailed views on the causes of the schism's growth in the region and specific proposals for countering it. He also complained about violations of the law by the "nests of schismatic depravity", as he called the Irgiz monasteries. Golitsyn agreed with him entirely and sent a plan for combating the schism to the Ministry of Internal Affairs of the Russian Empire, which was approved on 27 June 1827. From that day forward, the Irgiz monasteries faced the state, provincial and church authorities as a united front, which was unprecedented. Nicholas I soon also defined his attitude toward the schism, making it his policy to "place the Old Believers outside the law and give free rein to complete arbitrariness toward them".

At the governor's request, a statistical description of the Transfiguration Monastery was compiled, in which the abbot reported that it had eight priests, and three churches. However, the matter for the Upper Transfiguration Monastery ended there. It was the most remote from Saratov, and the authorities concentrated their attention on the closer communities.

The first to suffer was the Nizhne-Voskresensky Monastery, geographically closer to the provincial capital. A prolonged confrontation with the governor ended with the monastery's conversion to Edinoverie. The Old Believers hastily convened a council at the Middle St. Nicholas Monastery (according to other sources, at the Upper Transfiguration Monastery), which condemned the actions of the abbot and brotherhood of the Resurrection Monastery, after which several years of relative calm ensued for the Old Believers, complicated by periodic attempts to evict all those living illegally in the monastery. Meanwhile, the monastery was recovering from a new fire that broke out on 10 May 1829.

The fire destroyed the wooden church, part of the wooden fence, more than half of the cells, and numerous icons and church vessels. According to the monks' estimates, the church was worth 50,000 roubles, the iconostasis 10,000, and the bells had cost 7,340 roubles. The other structures were valued by the monks at 16,000 roubles, while the church vessels and icons were not valued at all, as no records of their worth existed, with the monks noting only that most of the icons had been in pearl vestments adorned with precious stones.

In Saratov, the governor was replaced again, and the new head of the province, V. Ya. Roslavets, to whom the monks applied for permission to replace the structures destroyed by fire with new ones, petitioned the Cabinet of Ministers, which approved the request on 10 June 1830. The monastery was soon rebuilt better than before. A large stone church was constructed, furnished with vessels and decorations of even greater beauty, elegance, and richness than before. The number of cells was somewhat reduced, but they became more spacious.

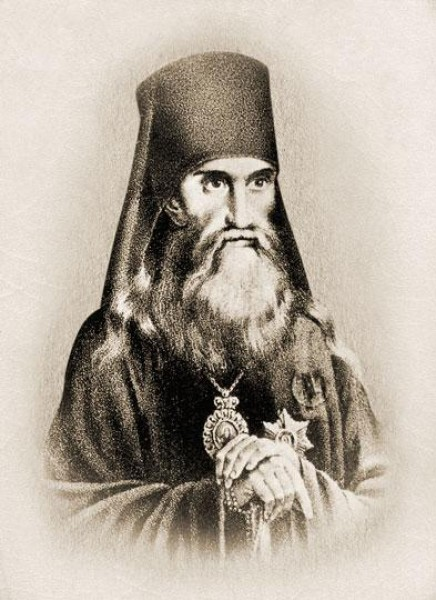
Iakov (Vecherkov)

In 1833, the Saratov and Volsk Diocese was headed by Iakov (Vecherkov), an ardent advocate of combating the schism; and the Ministry of Internal Affairs, distrusting the governor, sent to the Irgiz a special-assignment official, Arsenyev, to develop a plan for eliminating the schism there. Arsenyev's proposal included the following points:

- A ban on residents sending their children to be taught in local homes (the Old Believers took children in for instruction while simultaneously engaging in illegal missionary activity);
- The expulsion of all unregistered monks and laymen from the monasteries to their places of permanent residence.
- The conversion of the Nicholas Monastery into an Orthodox church, with the remaining monks transferred to the Transfiguration Monastery.

Arsenyev counted 99 monks in the monastery, but considered them foolish and embittered hypocrites hiding behind an outward show of humility. He singled out only two monks among the rest. In his words, the abbot Siluan was "clever and lively, gentle yet cunning, held in great esteem and respect by all", and the 24-year-old monk Platon (Vandyshev) was likewise "evasive and sensible, the future hope of the brotherhood".

For the time being, however, fresh troubles passed the monastery by. The next provincial governor, Pereverzev, like his predecessors P. U. Belyakov and A. D. Panchulidzev, had no qualms about accepting gifts from the Old Believers and in every way delayed the implementation of any directives concerning them. The monastery continued to be built up: it was enclosed by a new fence on stone pillars, and inside the enclosure a tall tower in the Gothic style was erected, ostensibly for the installation of a chiming clock, yet also very conveniently suited for the hanging of bells. The hieromonk Ilariy, who had fled the Irgiz during Golitsyn's governorship, returned and hid in the cell of the monastery's ustavshchik Afanasy. In the winter of 1834 alone, in defiance of all prohibitions and written undertakings given to the authorities, he tonsured five persons as monks.

However, the lull did not last long. In 1837, the next Saratov governor, A. Stepanov, virtually stormed the Middle St. Nicholas Monastery, transferring it to the Edinoverie brotherhood. At the same time, the women's Middle Dormition Monastery was completely liquidated. The Upper Transfiguration Monastery now remained the last stronghold of the Old Believers on the Irgiz. However, the siege and storming of the monastery with the use of military detachments, though without fatalities, was accompanied by considerable bloodshed and scandal, which cost the governor his post, giving the Upper Monastery a little more time. And although the emperor ordered the new governor, Bibikov, to "keep in view the possibility of abolishing the last schismatic Upper Transfiguration Monastery", the monastery merely had bell ringing banned once again, now with strict oversight of compliance by the authorities; and the open performance of religious services was prohibited, though they continued in secret.

On 28 November 1839, the Minister of State Properties, Kiselyov, submitted to the Secret Committee on Schism Affairs a proposal to finally abolish both Upper Monasteries, converting their inhabitants into state peasants and transferring surplus lands to the treasury. However, mindful of the tragic events of 1837, the committee did not consider it possible to adopt such a decision immediately. The emperor also left his resolution on the committee's journal Exercise caution" Only a year and a half later, on 27 April 1841, an imperial decree was issued, according to which:

1. Upon the death of the last monks listed in the 1797 register and the cessation of divine services, the Upper Monastery shall be converted into an Edinoverie monastery. If deemed necessary, several monks from another Edinoverie monastery shall be transferred to it and a separate priest shall be appointed at the discretion of the diocesan authority.
2. The persons currently in charge of the monastery, should they join Edinoverie, shall be left in their positions and their taxes and duties paid until the next census from the monastery's revenues.
3. Other people living there shall likewise be left in the monastery on the same condition.
4. Taxes shall also be paid from the monastery's revenues for all state peasants registered to the monastery. This applies to those who refuse to accept Edinoverie, as well as to those living in the monastery under passports who have no means of finding shelter elsewhere. These people shall be placed in the almshouse at this monastery.
5. The lands allotted in 1801 shall remain with the monastery.

=== Conversion to Edinoverie ===
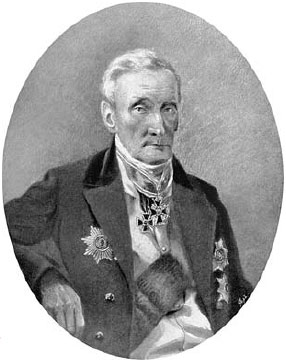
Andrei Mikhailovich Fadeyev

The new governor, A. M. Fadeyev, who was tasked with putting the decree into effect, developed with the bishop a careful plan for the non-confrontational conversion of both Upper Monasteries to Edinoverie. They decided that to ensure success it was necessary to achieve

1. the suddenness and unexpectedness of the execution with respect to the inhabitants of the monastery, and the prevention of any obstacle to the execution during the very implementation. 2. the elimination of the moral incentive for the surrounding Old Believers to return the monasteries to the Old Belief, and the prevention of any disturbances on their part after the conversion.

Achieving the first point required complete secrecy and concealment of preliminary arrangements; achieving the second required the Edinoverie clergy to enter the churches and sprinkle them with holy water as quickly as possible – so that the Old Believer shrine would be desecrated in the eyes of the schismatics.

The plan began to be carried out in the third week of May 1841. Fadeyev informed officials in Saratov that he was supposedly travelling to Kuznetsky Uyezd together with Gendarmerie Major Yesinov to suppress peasant disturbances, while simultaneously sending a letter to Nikolayevsk stating that he was travelling to the provincial border for negotiations with the Orenburg governor-general, and himself departed for Volsk. There he demanded from the commander of the invalid company 12 privates with one non-commissioned officer for dispatch to Nikolayevsky Uyezd. Horses were reserved there for the governor's carriage and his officials. The governor ordered the postal service along the highway to Balakovo to be halted: it was forbidden both to provide postal horses and to receive or send parcels by civilian carts. Meanwhile, on 27 May, the abbots of the Lower and Middle Edinoverie monasteries gathered at the Middle St. Nicholas Monastery and fixed the time for taking possession of the Upper Monastery at 10 in the morning of the following day, notifying Fadeyev of this by secret note. The time was chosen on the probability that at that hour virtually the entire population of the monastery would be assembled in the church.

However, Fadeyev spent the whole of 27 May in Nikolayevsk, where he was inspecting the government offices, while spreading the rumour that he was travelling to survey the Bashkir lands. In the evening he invited the town commandant, the ispravnik, and the district head of the state peasant administration, to whom he secretly disclosed the true purpose of his visit. It was decided to spread a rumour through the town that five prisoners had escaped. The town commandant, under the pretext of capturing them, cordoned off the town with mounted and foot sentries and requisitioned all means of crossing the Irgiz, forbidding any crossing of the river toward the Transfiguration Monastery. Meanwhile, the ispravnik and the district head gathered a large number of Old Believer peasants from the villages near the monastery and sent them as witnesses, ostensibly to the boundary of the Bashkir lands some 25 versts from the monastery, after which they recruited around 200 more witnesses, but this time of the Orthodox faith.

On the morning of the 28th the operation began: Orthodox witnesses cordoned off the Transfiguration and Intercession monasteries, with even the witnesses themselves convinced they had been posted to detain fugitive prisoners. The abbots of the two other monasteries, Platon and Arseny, taking with them a hieromonk, a priest, a deacon, and four choir singers in closed carriages, set out from the Middle St. Nicholas Monastery so as to arrive at the Transfiguration Monastery by 7 in the morning. The governor drove up to the monastery just as Matins were ending, requested all the monks to assemble "for a necessary conversation with him", where he read out to them the imperial command concerning the monastery and took from each individually their agreement or refusal to convert to Edinoverie. Meanwhile, Major Yesipov posted soldier guards at the monastery gates, the church, the vestry, and the bell tower, after which he summoned Archimandrite Platon.

Fadeyev later wrote that all the monks "received the imperial command, at least outwardly, with submission and humility, but did not agree to join Edinoverie", for they "had not yet prepared their conscience to abandon the separation of their ancestors from the Russian Church and to submit to the diocesan authority". At that moment Archimandrite Platon entered the church with his clergy; in the presence of the monks the governor read out the imperial command to him, after which Platon, in full vestments, immediately served a moleben and sprinkled the church and altar with holy water. With the aim of demonstrating to the monks the spurious antiquity of the church and the fraudulent nature of their shrine, he brought out for inspection the antimension lying on the altar table, which turned out to bear neither relics nor a bishop's signature.

Siluan was ordered to maintain calm among the monastery's inhabitants, while a military guard was left in the monastery. The governor and Platon then proceeded to the women's monastery, where everything was repeated. The archimandrite then began taking inventory of the monastery's property, which turned out to be considerably more than recorded in the registers. Fadeyev wrote in his report to the Minister of Internal Affairs:

one cannot pass over in silence here the peculiarity of the perhaps deliberate, but no less unexpected, act of the former abbot Siluan. This man, possessed of a remarkable natural intelligence given his origins, who for many years had exerted a powerful influence over the adherents of the Old Belief, upon the near-completion of the inventory came to me and the archimandrite with an earnest request to receive into the monastery's treasury the donated funds that had been preserved with him at various times, 7,800 roubles, consisting of notes of the Savings Treasury in the name of an unknown person; he added that no formality obliged him to do so, but solely from a desire to clear his conscience and to show that he fully felt, as did all his like-minded brethren, the full mildness and moderation of the measures by which the immutable supreme will of the sovereign had been carried into effect.

That same day the Old Believers of Nikolayevsk and the surrounding villages were informed of the execution of the imperial command regarding the monastery, of the consecration of its churches, and of the opening of Edinoverie worship. It was further explained that the conversion of the monastery would in no way affect the position of the Old Believers and would not entail their forcible conversion to Edinoverie. The schismatics received the accomplished facts with humility and submission. The submission of the monks to the government's will was advantageous to them: bearing this in mind, Fadeyev left their movable property at their disposal, confiscating only the monastic vestments, books, and handwritten notebooks. On 28 May 1841, "the sun of Orthodoxy set on the Irgiz for good."

Of the 15 monks and 27 laymen remaining in the community at that time, 13 monks and 10 laymen were left in it pending further orders, under military supervision: "for the maintenance of guards in the Transfiguration and Intercession monasteries converted to Edinoverie, until further notice there shall remain the 12 privates and one non-commissioned officer sent from the Volsk Invalid Company, and 5 privates and one non-commissioned officer from the Nikolayevsk company."

Several days after the conversion, Bishop Iakov visited the monastery in an attempt to persuade anyone else to convert to Edinoverie and to consecrate the church as quickly as possible. However, only one monk, Trefily, agreed to convert to Edinoverie, and even he, according to the Old Believers, did so only to avoid the conscription that threatened him. In an attempt to convert Siluan, he was appointed to manage the monastery's household affairs; however, no sooner had the bishop returned to Saratov than he was overtaken by Platon's complaint against Siluan, requesting that he be transferred out of the monastery. Iakov, rightly considering that Siluan was far safer under supervision, strongly recommended "maintaining in Siluan that disposition toward the community which he had displayed by voluntarily transferring to it the monetary notes and a considerable quantity of pearls". Platon either could not or would not do so, and Siluan left the monastery and settled in Khvalynsk.

=== Aftermath ===
The conversion of the monastery was a painful loss for the Old Believers. For a long time afterward, echoes of this grief appeared in folk compositions among the Old Believers of the Volga region:

The whole world's years are passing on,
The end of the age is drawing closer;
Cruel times have come,
Heavy years have come:
The Orthodox faith does not exist anymore,
Neither the stone wall,
Neither the strong pillars,
The Christian faith has perished…

The diocesan and civil authorities assessed what had happened differently. Bishop Iakov wrote to the governor: "This is a splendid beginning to your new service to the throne and the fatherland. This is a diamond in the crown of your governorship… The holy Saratov Church will remember you and pray to God for you."

The historian Ivan Dobrotvorsky wrote:

The conversion of the Irgiz schismatic monasteries to Edinoverie was beneficial not only for Saratov Governorate, but for all of Russia. Neither the stubborn schismatics nor the brazen violators of the laws and harmful members of the state and society now conceal their crimes in the Irgiz monasteries under the guise of the old faith.

Much the same enthusiastic tone was adopted by A. F. Leopoldov in his manuscript "On the Schismatic Sects of Saratov Governorate."

However, the destruction of the monasteries did not reduce the number of schismatics in the region; on the contrary, it increased. If in 1826 the Ministry of Internal Affairs of the Russian Empire counted 41,761 Old Believers in Saratov Governorate and the diocesan administration counted 14,602, then by 1847 the ministry counted 35,338 and the bishop counted 33,990 schismatics of the fugitive-priest persuasion alone. In 1854, the official Artemyev counted as many as 125,000 Old Believers. The fate of the monks evoked sympathy from the population: "they were considered martyrs for the faith, people maintained relations with them and held them in reverence." Of all the monastics from all five Old Believer monasteries, no more than 20 converted to Edinoverie. The majority of the Irgiz monks resettled in the district town of Khvalynsk and its surroundings – remote places at a considerable distance from the provincial authorities. According to a report by the Khvalynsk dean from 1845, on Sundays and feast days in the chapel "on the town square… there gather from 1,000 or more persons from the surrounding villages of Nikolayevsky and Khvalynsky uyezds… The preceptor is the Khvalynsk townsman Semyon Nikiforov, formerly abbot of the Upper Irgiz schismatic monastery, known in monastic life as Siluyan."

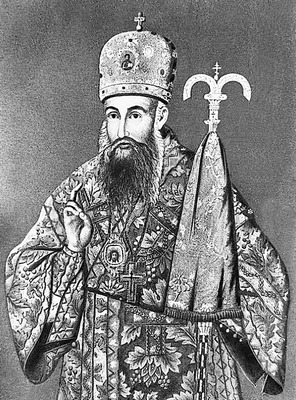
Ambrose (Papageorgopoulos)

Even decades later, in 1886, Saratov Orthodox missionaries counted in the diocese 26,261 adherents of the Austrian persuasion, 26,259 fugitive-priest adherents, 32,025 Pomorians, 23,578 Spasovites, and in total, together with Fedoseyevites, Filippovites, and wanderers – 126,036 Old Believers. Thus the government not only failed to overcome the Old Belief but also contributed to its spread throughout the region. And although by the mid-nineteenth century the history of the Irgiz as an all-Russian centre of the Old Belief had ended, the last great achievement of the brotherhood of the Upper Transfiguration Monastery may have allowed the schism to survive to the present day. According to the Old Believers' own testimony, it was the Irgiz monks – in particular the secretary of the Upper Transfiguration Monastery, Affoniy Kochuev, and Abbot Siluan (Nikiforov) – who at the pan–Old Believer Council of 1831 insisted on seeking a bishop from abroad. This initiative was driven by the theological realization among prominent Irgiz monks that the practice of receiving and re-anointing fugitive priests was canonically unsustainable and could not guarantee apostolic succession in the long term. They argued that establishing an independent episcopate was essential to resolve the priestly crisis and secure the sacramental life of the Old Believer communities. Their advocacy provided the ideological basis for the 1846 mission to the Ottoman Empire, which resulted in the reception of the Bosnian Metropolitan Ambrose and the subsequent formation of the Belokrinitskaya Hierarchy. In 1846, Metropolitan Ambrose (Papageorgopoulos) became such a bishop, and it was thanks to him that the Old Belief of the Belokrinitsa persuasion acquired the fullness of the hierarchy, although many did not recognise this hierarchy on account of the unilateral episcopal ordinations performed by Metropolitan Ambrose.

== The Old Believer monastery's description ==
=== Monastic brotherhood ===
As of 2009, no documents clarifying the governance of the Old Believer monastery had yet been found, and in general no documentary evidence predating the pre-co-religionist era at the monastery was discovered as early as the 1880s by N. Sokolov when he was writing his study.

The monastery is traditionally considered to have been a communal one, meaning that all monastic property was held in common and no one, not even the abbot, owned anything personally. However, from the early 19th century monks began to acquire private property; the brotherhood ceased to receive maintenance and clothing from the monastery, and only elderly paupers and lay workers of the community continued to live according to the strict rule.

Initially the monastery was populated by people from Poland, but it soon began to attract residents arriving from different parts of Russia. Although the majority came from Saratov Governorate itself, there were also those from the Don and the Urals, from the Moscow area, Nizhny Novgorod, Saint Petersburg, Perm, and Siberia. A great variety of regions and social estates were represented: among the monks and novices were military men and peasants, merchants and townspeople, members of the educated class (raznochintsy), and even nobles. Such diversity was not found in any Orthodox monastery.

Whereas initially nothing more than the wish to join was required to enter the brotherhood, in the last years of the Old Believer monastery a great deal was demanded. While the community lived by its labour, an increase in the number of working hands was only welcomed; once the community had grown wealthy and acquired sources of income other than labour, each new member of the brotherhood reduced the share of income for the rest. At that time a set fee payable to the monastery was established for newcomers, the amount of which was determined individually at the discretion of the abbot and the council of elders, though not less than the cost of the cell assigned to the incoming monk. Those accepted without payment were chiefly those who arrived with the recommendation of the monastery's patrons and powerful figures, in the hope of future benefits for the community. Others who could not pay the fee were required to spend several years living in the community as monastic lay workers before being deemed worthy of tonsure, thereby substituting the entry fee with payment in kind.

Residents enrolled directly in the monastery in the census of 1797 were counted as appanage peasants and paid the corresponding taxes. In the early 19th century, for each registered soul it was necessary to pay 8 roubles in favour of the appanage, 3 roubles in poll tax, 30 kopecks for the zemstvo duty, and 69 kopecks for the upkeep of the appanage chancery. A certain quantity of grain also had to be delivered annually to the warehouses of the appanage department. In addition, a significant number of persons lived in the monastery on release certificates, discharge papers, and temporary passports, registered as members of various peasant, townspeople, and merchant communities, who were required to pay taxes according to their place of permanent registration. Thus, one of the monastery's well-known abbots, Siluan, bore monetary obligations as a burgher of Khvalynsk, despite having lived in the monastery for years on end. Serfs bore the heaviest burden; for example, the monk Filaret reported to the local police superintendent that he paid his landowner Zelentsev an annual obrok of 100 roubles "from the monastery's generosity," despite being unfit for work.

Those residing in the monastery on a legal basis were called litsevye ('registered'), alongside whom there were always plenty of slepenkiye or siroty ('blind ones' or 'orphans') – that is, all manner of fugitives, those without passports, or those with expired documents. These were sometimes enrolled in the brotherhood, receiving the names and papers of those who had died or left the monastery. Their cells were assigned closer to the enclosure wall so that in case of danger they could slip into the forest.

At the head of the monastery stood the abbot, who was sometimes elected not only by the monastic brotherhood but by the entire Irgiz monastic community, by peasants of the surrounding villages, and also with the active participation of merchants from Volsk and Khvalynsk, who frequently interfered in the life of the community. Thus on 28 January 1793, Sergiy (Yurshev) was elected abbot by a decision of 18 members of the brotherhood; and in 1795, at an election in which monks from all the Irgiz monasteries and many laypeople took part, he was replaced by Isaakiy. From 1820 onwards, by order of the appanage chancery, only those enrolled in the appanage department participated in the elections, and the act of election was confirmed by the district police superintendent and the governor. In civil terms, abbots were equated with village elders with their rights and responsibilities; all communications between the civil administration and the brotherhood went exclusively through them.

Twelve council elders were also elected to assist the abbot, likewise for an indefinite term, one of whom performed the duties of the ustavshchik (master of ceremonies) and another that of the treasurer. Although it was understood that they would oversee the abbot's activities, not all abbots submitted to such oversight. The treasurer administered the entire domestic economy, hired workers when necessary, made purchases, sold products of the monastic economy, and managed the community's legal affairs, for which purpose he kept a permanent agent or attorney in town. The treasurer usually also served as the acting abbot, performing his duties in his absence. The ustavshchik was in charge of the church order and the vestry. He was thoroughly acquainted with all the customs and rules of Old Believer worship and the performance of liturgical rites, and oversaw their observance, attending every service without fail. In the absence of a priest he could conduct all services himself except the Liturgy – that is, he could perform prayer services, memorial services (panikhidy), and even funerals. The ustavshchik also imposed penances (epitimyi) on offenders and awarded those who were deserving.

Each of the council elders, like the abbot, had the right to take young monks and novices under his spiritual direction and authority; these were called "gospel children" (evangel'skiye deti). The number of such children depended on the popularity and authority of the elder; the abbot had the most. In relation to their gospel children, the spiritual fathers held the right of punishment, which was either private or public in character. For minor offences, rowdiness, and drunkenness, a private penance was assigned, consisting of an increased number of prostrations, punishment by birch rods, or confinement in some storeroom, sometimes in chains. For more serious offences a public penance was imposed, consisting of kneeling in church with the obligation to make a very large number of prostrations. Monastic clergy were not exempt from penance either, though the sanction was imposed on them personally by the abbot. The number of those undergoing penance was always considerable, owing to the conviction prevailing in the monastery that such means could reform even those who had long since lost all sense of morality.

The abbot and council elders formed the monastery's leadership; the main body consisted of ordinary monks and occasionally schema-monks (skhimniki). While within the monastery walls, all wore special clothing, somewhat different from that customary in Orthodox monasteries. The costume consisted of a long shirt reaching almost to the ground, over which was worn a black woollen kaftan, ungirded "so that the Spirit of God might pass through more freely," with narrow sleeves and a velvet, plush, or woollen cuff. Around the neck, over the kaftan, was tied a round pelerine or a long, round-cut collar trimmed along its edge with red fabric. On the head was worn a round black cloth cap resembling a skufia or yarmulke, with a silk or sheepskin band, over which was placed a kind of cover with a very long collar, from which extended long rectangular flaps reaching to the knees, with red cord trim along the edges. When leaving the monastery walls, monks usually wore secular clothing owing to existing state prohibitions.

The clothing of schema-monks differed in that eight-pointed crosses, and sometimes a staff, a spear, and flying cherubim, were embroidered or sewn with braid onto their kamilavkas from all sides. In addition they wore a podsokhimnik – a round, knob-shaped cap on which crosses and one cherub each were embroidered on front and back – and a skhima – a kind of priestly epitrachelion made of coarse white or pale red hair-cloth, with an embroidered image of one large cross and many small ones, one end of the skhima being thrown over the head. The podsokhimnik and skhima were worn only at communion or before death.

The lowest class of monastic residents consisted of laybrothers (bel'tsy) – persons who had not yet taken tonsure but were registered as candidates for monasticism. Some were novices under the elders, others sang in the kliros, the latter being recruited principally from children who were being educated in the monastery. In the last years of the Old Believer monastery's existence there was, through the efforts of Abbot Siluan, a remarkable choir known throughout all of Russia. Siluan spared neither resources nor privileges for his singers. The choir was large, but assembled in its full complement only on great feast days or on the occasion of important guests; on ordinary days each kliros consisted of a dozen singers serving in alternating shifts of twenty-four hours under the sacristan (ponomar), changing on a weekly rotation. The choir was directed by a golovshchik or choir director, whose duties included not only conducting the choir but intoning each song, with the choir joining in after him. Singing was slow, in the demestvennoye manner, according to kryukovyye (neume) notation. The singing books with their musical notation were for the most part copied in the monastery itself; this art was quite well developed and formed part of the curriculum of monastic education. The greater part of church chants and a great many religious and morally edifying hymns and psalms had been transcribed into neume notation. This scriptorium activity ensured the preservation of pre-Nikonian liturgical texts and Znamenny chant notation, which were marginalized by the official Synodal Church. Additionally, the monastery produced icons adhering to traditional canons, which were distributed to Old Believer communities and often served as significant material assets for the brotherhood.The monastery's scriptorium functioned as one of the main centers for the reproduction of pre-Nikonian liturgical texts prior to the widespread use of clandestine printing presses. Monks transcribed theological treatises, polemical works, and musical-theoretical guides using Znamenny chant notation. In addition to manuscript production, the monastery produced icons that adhered to traditional canonical proportions. These works were noted for their use of specific materials, including gold leaf and natural pigments, and were distributed to Old Believer communities across the Russian Empire.Singers were allowed great freedom in their way of life, since if dissatisfied they could simply leave for a neighbouring monastery, given that serious competition existed between the choirs of the monasteries. Many singers were married men, and their wives and children lived with them in the monastery in shared cells, in deviation from the established rules.

Novices who were not singers but obedients bore no obligatory service in the monastery and only performed "obedience" – that is, assignments and orders from their spiritual father. They were required only to attend church daily at each public service, as were the monks. In general, attendance at services was obligatory for everyone except the abbot. Monks and laybrothers living in the monastery were bound to it by nothing and could leave the monastery and go elsewhere at any time.

Besides permanent residents, there were always many visitors in the monastery, belonging to one of two groups. Those called "monastery guests" were merchants, craftsmen, and other Old Believers who did not belong to the monastery but lived in it for several months or even years. Wealthy merchants sometimes sent their children to familiar elders for education; cells were then built and furnished at the parents' expense, with a staff of servants established. Such cells served as accommodation for relatives visiting the monastery, who sometimes stayed for extended periods. On completion of their education, such cells passed into the possession of the monastery or of the monk-educator. Guests who had no cell of their own stayed with familiar elders, since there was no common guest cell.

The other group of residents in the monastery consisted of fugitive Orthodox priests. After the isprava (correction of their ordination) they became "monastic", as if belonging to the monastery, even if they were released to some community for a period or permanently. They were at the abbot's disposal, though not counted among the monastic brotherhood. They sometimes arrived at the monastery with their wives and children, in which case they were housed in separate cells outside the enclosure. They were maintained at the monastery's expense, receiving from it, in addition to lodging, heating, lighting, bread, and other necessities. Usually no more than three to seven priests resided at the monastery at any one time, gradually being sent out to various Old Believer communities. The most reliable, modest, and sober priests were kept for service in the monastery itself; they took turns conducting daily services and performing liturgical rites, of which there were many. Remote requiem services were often conducted, along with prayer services, memorial services, confession and communion of the sick, weddings, and baptisms; the last two sacraments were performed in special cells, since they could not be performed in the monastic church under the requirements of the rule. For disobedience or deviation on the part of a priest or deacon from the liturgical order, they were fined by the withholding of a portion of their payment for performing rites and services.

=== Monastic economy ===
The monastery's revenues were enormous. Whereas in its early years the monks had almost nothing, by the early 19th century the monastery's property was valued at more than one hundred thousand roubles – an enormous sum that placed it on a par with the wealthiest monasteries of the Russian Orthodox Church. Old Believers came from all over Russia to the monastery bearing valuable gifts for their spiritual sanctuary.

An important source of the monastery's income was the revenue received from sending out corrected priests. The total of these revenues is unknown, as the monks carefully concealed them from the authorities; however, it is known that renting a priest for a year cost an Old Believer community between 200 and 500 roubles, while permanently obtaining a priest cost between 500 and 2,000 roubles. On the basis of available evidence concerning the number of priests "corrected" in the monasteries, N. S. Sokolov estimates the profit of each of the Irgiz monasteries from this type of activity alone at 20,000 roubles annually.

Another significant source of income came from the monastery's extensive landholdings. With 8,312 desyatinas of land, the monastery sowed only about 40 desyatinas with winter and spring grain crops, while the rest was usually leased out.The land was worked by hired labourers, and neighbouring Old Believer peasants also assisted with the harvest. Due to its substantial grain reserves, the monastery also acted as a creditor, providing loans to local peasants and merchants during economic shortages, thereby influencing the local agrarian economy. The harvested grain was processed at the monastic farmstead and ground at the monastery's own mills. The mills were also leased out.

The monastery engaged in livestock farming, keeping up to one thousand head of cattle, of which in 1827 there were 105 head of horned cattle and 67 horses. Only meadow hay was prepared for winter, since the steppe grass was grazed down by herds over the summer. In a good year it was possible to collect up to 300 haystacks, and in a poor year up to 100; but these figures would have been considerably higher had not workers been hired for haymaking with the right to receive half the yield as their wages. With weak oversight from the monks, the peasants profited well from such work.

The fisheries on the Irgiz River and in neighbouring lakes were operated inefficiently; the fisheries were sometimes leased out, but even when fished by the monastery's own means, they nonetheless annually harvested up to a thousand poods of carp, zander, catfish, bream, crucian carp, perch, tench, pike, and ruffe. There was an apiary, but despite the constant need for beeswax for candles, it was not particularly developed and was kept in a state of neglect. Income also came from forestry; the forests on the monastery's lands were under the management of the forestry department, which contributed to their preservation and prevented their depreciation, while the timber felled annually was more than sufficient for heating the monastery and for necessary construction works.

Donations to the monastery were also a significant source of income. The exact sums cannot be ascertained today, and at the time only the abbot and treasurer knew them. Donations were of two kinds. Some were brought by pilgrims as a form of indirect payment for their reception, for the commemoration of relatives among the living, for entry into the synodikon for remembrance, and the like. In addition, the monastery dispatched collectors of alms throughout all of Russia, chosen from among the most honest and worthy monks. They were given a covering letter explaining the purpose of the collection – usually some repair or embellishment of the church was cited – along with a bound book signed by the abbot, in which all collected donations were recorded. Such alms were not only monetary but also material: in the capital cities, church vessels and fabrics for vestments were donated; in Siberia, iron and copper goods; on the Don, wine and fruit; in the Urals, entire consignments of fish of all kinds; in Kazan, leather; and in Yaroslavl, linen. Donors did not go without a reciprocal gift in the form of a small icon, a cross, or a prosphora – items inexpensive in price but of great importance to religious people.

According to the abbot's official report to the authorities alone, the monastery received revenues of between 8,000 and 16,000 roubles annually, although in reality the figures were considerably higher, since these reports entirely omitted revenues from the dispatch of priests, and it is doubtful that the other items of income were recorded in full. The monastery maintained no capital reserves; in the event of a deficit, the abbot borrowed the necessary sums from private individuals, repaying them in more economical years. The true revenues of the monastery were known to no one except the abbot and the treasurer, neither of whom left records for historians.

The largest regular items of expenditure for the monastery were wine and bribes, or, according to other accounts, bribes and the upkeep of the community. The provincial ecclesiastical and civil authorities, mindful of the tsar's patronage, hardly interfered in monastic affairs and placed no obstacles in the way of the Old Believers; among lower-ranking officials, only the laziest did not receive presents from the monasteries, and the post of Volsk district superintendent was considered the most profitable in the governorate:

The schismatics corrupt officials with their wealth, draw them to their side, and compel them, tempted by bribery, to do what is contrary to the laws and aims of the state.

Kliros singers received official clothing and footwear, as well as a quarterly share from the divided church collection box according to personal merit, usually between 5 and 50 roubles. Priests received 2 roubles for each liturgy, deacons 1 rouble and a share from the collection box according to merit; in a month this amounted to no less than 40 roubles. Every quarter there was also a distribution among cells of the money received for prayer services, memorial services, and the like – the sums were quite considerable, since liturgical rites were performed very frequently. In addition there was the practice of personal gifts from wealthy guests directly into the hands of monks. Taking into account the low prices of the first third of the 19th century, it can be stated that the inhabitants of the monastery always had a sufficient quantity of disposable money to satisfy not only their needs but also their whims.

With growing prosperity came growing deviation from the original statutes of monastic life. The principle of communality was violated; monks were recognized as having the right to personal property; they ceased to be provided with maintenance and clothing, these allowances being left only for elderly paupers and lay workers. The common meal existed only for appearances, though it was by no means meagre: on feast days fish, millet porridge with butter, and milk were served; on weekdays, soup made from raw cabbage and porridge of husked wheat with vegetable oil, with cucumbers, sauerkraut, and bread always in abundance. In their cells, however, the monks ate considerably better; novices often prepared for their spiritual fathers dishes of poultry and beef that were far from monastic.

=== Monastic mores ===
One of the complex and historically unresolved questions concerning the monastery is the extent to which monks were guilty of sins against monastic life more grave than the breaking of fasts, particularly in the last years of its existence.

A significant portion of the sources notes that the influx of wealth changed life in the community. Whereas in the first years after its founding the monastery had been a centre of asceticism, the monks subsequently departed considerably from the modesty expected of them. Labour lost its esteem in the monastery; many acquired personal households, and on the monastery grounds on holidays and weekends a fair was held at which goods forbidden to monks – including tea, tobacco, and sugar – were sold.

The initially oppositional attitude towards the official Church led to the community accepting, according to some sources, any fugitive Orthodox priest. Neither documents nor the reasons for their falling from grace were asked of them. At the same time, many who came to the monastery had been deprived of their orders for unseemly conduct – for avarice or drunkenness – and were unwilling to abandon their habits in their new place of residence. Moreover, almost all the priests who had fled to the Irgiz were widowers and, being unable under canon to enter into a second marriage, many violated the seventh commandment. Although the priests did not reside in the monastery itself, the monks were aware of such violations; however, the acute shortage of Old Believer priests compelled them to turn a blind eye to their behaviour. This permissiveness led to the monks of the monastery themselves soon openly visiting neighbouring Old Believer settlements to make close acquaintance with the opposite sex. One of the Irgiz old-timers wrote in his "domestic notes": "Beyond the Volga there were not enough coals for the smiths to forge the chains in which drunken and rowdy monks and priests were shackled, and not enough wine in the taverns, owing to the licentiousness of our hermits, who, imitating Muslims in their licentiousness with regard to their harems, likewise observed their own religiosity."

"Drunkenness was accompanied by debauchery: illicit relations between monks and nuns 'were not considered a reprehensible way of life'; particularly many outrages occurred in summer, during the grain harvest, and also at public festivities on major feast days."

Hieromonk Arseny wrote:

Illicit relations between monks and nuns and their constant cohabitation were not considered a reprehensible way of life; on all feast days nuns and novices came to the men's monastery under the pretext of prayer. They allowed themselves to spend the night in cells shared with the monks, while the kliros singers stayed with the kliros men and were entertained with drunkenness to an immoderate degree; and then the monks together with the kliros men, conversely, went to the women's monastery without any compunction by day and by night. Many monks were married and had their wives in the monasteries.

In his memorandum, Bishop Yakov (Vecherkov) accused the monastery's abbot Siluan of a liaison with a girl named Alexandra, who resided in the Pokrovsky Monastery in the cell of the schema-nun Olimpiada of Moscow; he accused the monk Iosaf of a liaison with the nun Pavlina Lavpinskaya, in whose cell in the Pokrovsky Monastery he lived, constantly drinking; however, this memorandum was in its day left without attention.

A. Leopoldov wrote:

…at all times women were freely admitted to the men's hermitages. Sometimes women spent entire nights in the men's hermitages, while monks spent them in the women's hermitages, and this was not considered a violation of the hermitage rules. Children were born from such relations and were raised there under the name of orphans. Not a few girls killed their children and threw them into the Irgiz. Drunkenness developed on a wide scale and was concealed by a mere outward pretence, hypocrisy, and only then in the presence of strangers.

At the same time, among Russian Old Believers the monastery continued to command respect and remained a religious sanctuary.

However, as early as the end of the 19th century, the evident lack of neutrality of publications containing such allegations was noted – in particular, the articles of Ivan Dobrotvorsky, which in many respects formed the original basis for such claims:

Their fundamental failing is tendentiousness. Their preconceived ideas are evident on every page, displayed shamelessly like a new patch on old clothing. At all costs, the author wants to prove that everything was bad in the schism, while it was good in Orthodoxy.

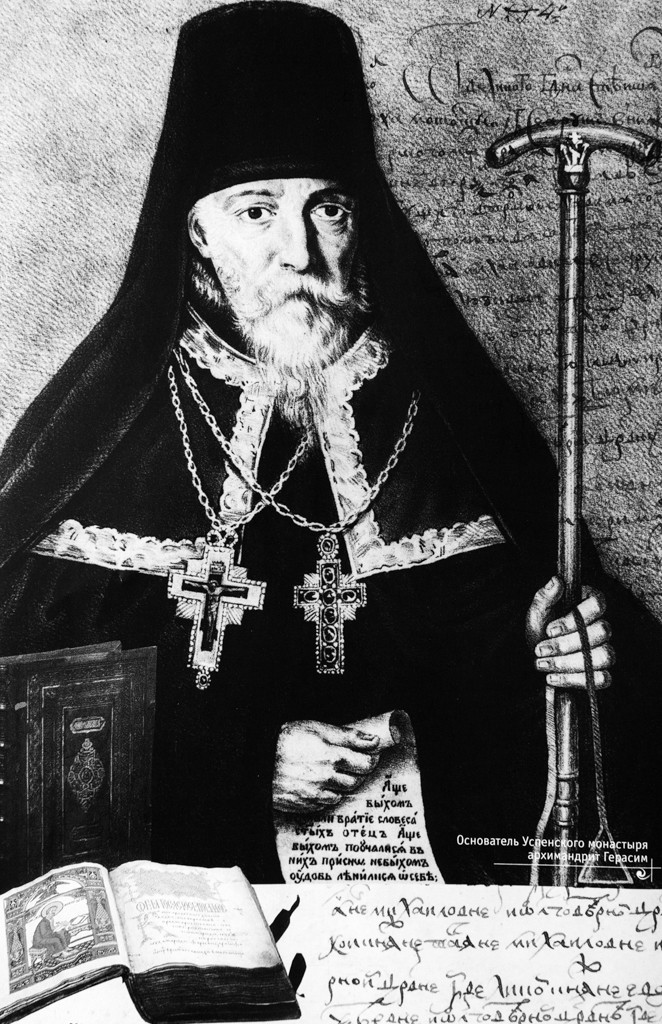
Archimandrite Gerasim

The assertion that the Old Believers accepted any fugitive priest is refuted by information from the prior Vysokovsky Uniate Hermitage Gerasim, a man who, in the opinion of the Metropolitan of Moscow and Kolomna, Filaret (Drozdov), was "deserving of trust and knowledgeable in the affairs of the schism". In a memorandum of 1828, Gerasim stated: "The schismatics carefully investigate whether the fugitive has been prohibited from serving or stripped of his orders; such a one they by no means accept for sacred ministry." N. S. Sokolov considers that the approach to assessing the suitability of a fugitive for the peremazy vaniye (re-anointing) depended primarily on the personality of the particular abbot.

Contemporary researchers of the history of the Irgiz monasteries predominantly regard reports of the monks' numerous transgressions as exaggerated and as part of anti-schismatic propaganda, noting that accounts of them appear only in late 19th-century sources, published moreover by the Synodal Church, and not supported by archival documents. The well-known fact of the discovery during the restoration of the Sredne-Nikolsky Monastery of several secret children's burial sites is associated with the Soviet period, when a colony was located on the monastery grounds.

=== Monastic life ===
The most important and indispensable element of life in the monastery was divine services. As noted above, attendance was obligatory for everyone, and this was no easy matter. Vespers gave way to the appointed canons and compline; after supper followed the dismissal prayers before sleep, matins, the Hours, and the liturgy; and on the eves of feast days matins was joined by the all-night vigil, which lasted until about seven o'clock. The liturgy was particularly prolonged, owing to the great number of those wishing to receive communion. Sometimes the council elders conducted services in their own cells together with their gospel children.

Visiting Old Believers did not enter the church without a prayer first read over them by a priest or hieromonk – the proshcha (absolution). Monastery residents entered without the proshcha, but with a preliminary threefold prostration with the sign of the cross before the icon above the entrance to the church. Having entered, they made seven prostrations – full prostrations on weekdays, bows from the waist on feast days. Men and women were placed separately in the church. At the conclusion of the service they again heard the proshcha or dismissal prayer.

After the liturgy, the meal began; the cellarer summoned the brethren to it by blows on a wooden semantron or klepalo, and also by three strokes of the bell. Those entering the refectory made three prostrations, recited a communal prayer, and only then sat down to dinner. The meal proceeded in complete silence; only on feast days was the taking of food accompanied by the loud reading aloud of the Chetyi-Minei or Torzhestvenik by one of the monks. The meal ended with further prayers and twelve bows from the waist. Supper proceeded similarly, only the prayers recited changed, and the number of bows was seventeen.

The furnishing of the monastic cells was of the simplest kind: roughly made benches and chairs, the bed being replaced by a rush mat or felt. The only decoration was the icon shelf (bozhnitsa), crowded with many icons of painted or cast workmanship. Beneath it, for those who were literate, stood books: the Psalter, the Book of Hours, spiritual anthologies (tsvetniki), and paterikons. Some had paintings of religious content.

In the monastic school, pupils studied all the knowledge necessary for a pious person. The Slavonic alphabet was learned, the Book of Hours and the Psalter were studied, and canons and stichera were memorised. Pupils were also taught writing, including ordinary cursive, church script, and neumes for singing books. In parallel, instruction in singing by neume notation took place. They sang from the Oktoechos, the Obikhod (liturgical handbook), and for practice studied heirmoi, stichera, the Gospel, and the lay liturgy (obednitsya). Drawing lessons were also given, though in modest measure: pupils were taught to copy drawings, opening words, and other ornaments from ancient manuscripts. Lessons took place in the morning and continued after the meal, beginning and ending with prayers. Order in the classroom was maintained by the senior pupil, who was held accountable for all oversights. As punishment, kneeling with the obligation to make a prescribed number of prostrations was used; sometimes pupils were punished with strokes of the birch rod or whip, and on rare occasions were even put in chains in dark storerooms.

Nuns from the neighbouring Verkhne-Pokrovsky Monastery also took part in the life of the community. They were hired to perform various tasks: they sewed undergarments and clothing for the monks, washed cells and churches before feast days, and watered the monastic garden and the cell flowerbeds.

== Edinoverie monastery ==
After the acceptance of Edinoverie, little changed within the monastery itself. Differences in liturgical practice were minor. Fyodor Parfyenyev, a monk of the Spaso-Preobrazhensky Edinoverie Monastery who frequently visited the Old Believer monastery as well, wrote that "the divine service in [Edinoverie] monasteries is conducted entirely according to the old rite and Typikon..."

Before the onset of persecutions and harassment of the brethren, the monastery housed up to 400 people. After the conversion, the number of brethren decreased. In 1860, the monastery housed 36 people, among whom were an archimandrite-abbot, three hieromonks, a priest, a hierodeacon, a deacon, a monk, two ryasophor novices, and three sticharion novices. From March 1851 to 1891, Archbishop Ioasaf served as abbot of the monastery. By a decree of the Holy Synod in December 1891, Hieromonk Tikhon (Obolensky), elevated on that occasion to the rank of archimandrite, became the new abbot.

In November 1894, by a decree of the Synod, an Edinoverie parish was opened at the monastery and an Edinoverie clergy was appointed. The positions of the Old Believers in the region remained strong, and the parish was established for missionary purposes.

At the end of the 19th century, a one-class school was opened at the monastery to teach boys living there Edinoverie reading and chanting. It was soon reorganized into a parish school. A second class with a missionary division was opened, training priests for Edinoverie parishes. Instruction was also provided in bookbinding, gilding of church books, and clerical work. In 1899, a teaching class was opened at the school. Although initially only 14 students attended the school, by 1907 the number had grown to 91, all of whom were fully provided for in exchange for performing various monastic duties: serving as sextons and bell-ringers, singing in the choir, and waiting in the refectory. In total, by 1915 the monastery housed approximately 130 people, including students.

From 1901, the position of deputy abbot was added to the monastery's staff, a post held until 1916 by Archimandrite Makary (M. A. Lichikov).

=== Closure of the monastery ===
On the basis of the Decree on Separation of Church from State and School from Church, by a resolution of the Nikolayevsk Uyezd Sovnarkom of 26 January 1918, the monastery was closed. The monastery's churches were converted for various institutional uses: the Transfiguration Church became a theatre, the Sergius Church a warehouse, and the Vvedensky Church a colony.

Today, the former monastery grounds are occupied by the Pugachyovsky sanatorium. Of the monastery's structures, two partially built wings and a half-ruined chapel have survived.

Following the nationalization of the monastery's property, its library and archives were transferred to state custody. The collection, which included early manuscripts, staropechatnye knigi, and internal monastic chronicles, was dispersed among state repositories. A portion of the manuscript collection was transferred to the Russian State Library and the State Historical Museum in Moscow, while other materials were deposited in the Saratov Regional Universal Scientific Library and local archival funds.

== Monastery property ==
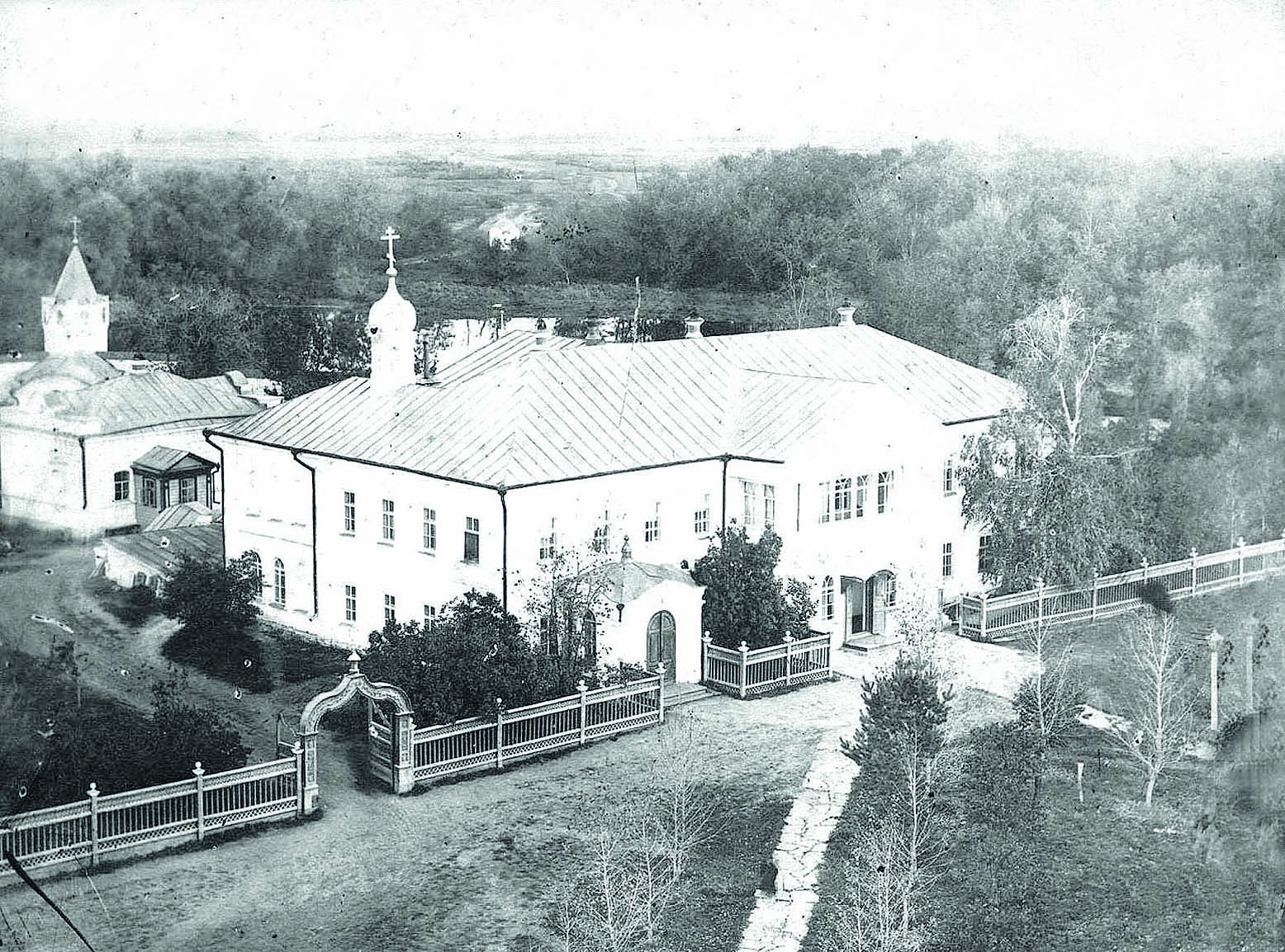
The Verkhnye Spaso-Preobrazhensky Monastery in the early 20th century

As early as 1790, through the efforts of Sergius (Yurshev), the monastery's lands were separated from the allotment lands of the peasants of Mechetnaya Sloboda. The Saratov uyezd land surveyor Popov demarcated enough land on the left bank of the Irgiz to eliminate land interstripping. Through the efforts of Pavel Runich, a new land survey was conducted in 1799, by which the Verkhnye-Uspensky Monastery received an enormous territory. Alexander I confirmed the preliminary order of Paul I in 1804 and secured the allocated lands for the monastery in perpetuity. The monastery owned 670 desyatinas (Note: The "treasury desyatina" was about 1.09 ha; the "proprietor's desyatina" was one third larger, about 1.46 ha. Lebedev (1911), the source summarized and cited here, is not known to have specified which desyatina was meant. All values here are rounded to three significant figures.) of arable land, 396 of hayfields, and 800 of forest. The monastery itself and its farmstead occupied 8.04 desyatinas. Salt marshes occupied 570 desyatinas, a third of which was suitable land – together, 8,320 desyatinas.

The soil was clay-like and saline, and arable farming was carried out without fertilisation. Part of the land was leased out, though on this land stood also the women's monastery, which had "about four desyatinas under its settlement, and up to fifteen or more desyatinas under kitchen gardens and melon patches". The forest consisted partly of oak, elm, aspen, and field maple. Birch, blackthorn, honeysuckle, caragana, meadowsweet, and field peaches were occasionally encountered. However, timber suitable for construction was very scarce, with trunks measuring up to 5 vershoks in cross-section at the cut.

=== Statistical description ===
In 1827, a statistical description of the monastery was compiled, preserving a record of the monastery's appearance and economy during that period.

According to this, the monastery occupied a circumference of approximately 440 sazhens and was enclosed by a wooden fence with four wooden gates. The monastery contained 79 cells, all wooden, one communal cellarer's room, and a bakery. In a separate stone vaulted structure, about 80 old-printed church books were kept, along with a parchment scroll by Hieromonk Theodosius concerning the celebration of the Liturgy. There were two grain storehouses, three sheds, a stable covered with planks and wood shingles, five wells, and a small orchard. At a short distance from the monastery enclosure stood a wooden smithy with a turf roof.

On the bank of the Irgiz stood the monastery's farmstead, built in 1780 for the threshing, harvesting, and storage of grain and other monastery provisions, as well as for livestock. It contained seven cells, a cellarer's room combined with a bakery, covered with wood shingles and straw, two grain warehouses, four livestock pens covered with straw, and one barn with a threshing floor. Four versts from the farmstead was an apiary with one wooden cell and two winterized beehive shelters; the apiary kept 50 beehives. Near the farmstead were two brick sheds, each with two kilns.

There were two water mills on Lake Kalach, one single-run and the other double-run, and one windmill with two runs near the farmstead. During high floods, the Irgiz connected with Lake Kalach, and as the water receded there was sufficient current to operate the mills. In dry years, however, the lake would dry up and the mills would cease to operate.

The livestock kept included 35 working oxen, 20 dairy cows, 50 head of heifers and other cattle, 20 brood mares, 2 stallions, 30 young horses, and 15 riding horses.

The monastery had two churches. One was a cold, wooden, painted church with a bell tower, built in the ancient style, covered with iron, fitted with a weekly clock, and hung with ten bells. The second was a warm stone church with five domes, a wooden ceiling, and an octagon on cube construction, also covered with iron. Images and church plate were plentiful: on the altar stood a silver ark with heavy gilding, worth thousands of roubles on its own, along with vessels, chandeliers, gospel books, crosses, and icon covers in silver with gemstones and pearls, all heavily gilded – totalling about forty thousand roubles. The monastery also had a small wooden chapel in its cemetery.

=== Further development ===
During the 19th century, the monastery's architectural ensemble transitioned from wooden structures to monumental stone buildings. The central Transfiguration Church was rebuilt in stone featuring an "octagon on cube" design, a traditional element of Russian ecclesiastical architecture. The complex was eventually enclosed by a stone wall with corner towers and three gates, the central Holy Gates being painted with images of saints. A bell tower incorporating pseudo-Gothic elements was also erected, serving both liturgical and observational purposes. On the courtyard grounds stood residential and service wings. Four stone wings housed the abbot and the brethren, while the others contained a bookbinding workshop, a guesthouse for pilgrims, and a free six-bed hospital treating ailing residents of the surrounding area.

On Lake Kalach, on 5 September 1855, a wooden chapel was built in memory of Nicholas I, and in 1886 a dam with gates was built to control the flow of meltwater. Fish were caught in the lake; some were delivered to the monastery kitchen and some sold. On 7 February 1897, the Samara Ecclesiastical Consistory attached the villages of Preobrazhyenka and Malaya Tavolozhka to the monastery.

In the second half of the 19th century, the monastery had four churches. The oldest – a stone, cold, single-altar church dedicated to the Transfiguration of Jesus – had been built by the Old Believers. The church had a semicircular altar apse, a three-cornice iconostasis with columns and half-columns, and three porches. There was also a freestanding stone three-tiered bell tower, with a single-story stone annex on its western side housing a vestry with church plate, a library, and a staircase to the bell tower proper.

On 15 November 1856, a new stone heated church dedicated to the Venerable Sergius of Radonezh was consecrated in the monastery. Between the church and the refectory, running the full width of the building, was a narthex with four doors: the eastern door led into the church, the western into the refectory, and the northern and southern to the porches. Later, in 1866, the refectory was converted into a side chapel named after St. Nicholas of Myra. In 1896, a refectory was again added to the church.

In 1857, another church was built in the abbot's wing of the monastery: a stone, heated, domestic single-altar church dedicated to the Presentation of the Most Holy Theotokos at the Temple. It housed a two-tiered iconostasis with twisted columns and half-columns, decorated with carving. On 17 September 1885, yet another stone, heated, single-altar church was consecrated in the monastery cemetery, dedicated to All Saints. Beneath this church was a crypt.

In total, the monastery held up to 400 icons, including some of considerable value. Other relics were also present, among them a parchment scroll by Hieromonk Theodosius concerning the celebration of the Liturgy, with various rulings on church ranks, written in 1424. The monastery's total property was valued at 200,000 roubles.

== Bibliography ==
- Dobrotvorsky, I. M. (1857). "Исторические сведения об Иргизских мнимостарообрядческих монастырях до обращения их к единоверию" [Historical Information on the Irgiz Pseudo-Old Believer Monasteries Before Their Conversion to Edinoverie]. Pravoslavny Sobesednik (journal). 1 (2): 376–481.
- Kargin, Yu. Yu. (2007). "Иргизские монастыри" [The Irgiz Monasteries]. Balakovskaya narodnaya entsiklopediya. Privolzhskoye izdatelstvo.
- Lebedev, A. A. (1911). К истории старообрядчества на Иргизе [On the History of Old Belief on the Irgiz]. Moscow: Typolithography of I. M. Mashistov.
- Leopoldov, A. F. (1896). Исторические заметки о Самарском крае [Historical Notes on the Samara Region].
- Macarius, Metropolitan (1889). История русского раскола, известного под именем старообрядства [History of the Russian Schism Known as Old Belief] (Third ed.). St. Petersburg: (Unknown).
- Macarius, Metropolitan (1855). История русского раскола, известного под именем старообрядства [History of the Russian Schism Known as Old Belief]. St. Petersburg: (Unknown).
- Melnikov, P. I. (1976). "Очерки поповщины" [Essays on the Priestly Faction]. Collected Works in 8 vols. Moscow: (Unknown). p. 476.
- Монастыри Самарского края (XVI—XX вв.): Справочник [Monasteries of the Samara Region (16th–20th Centuries): A Reference Work]. Samara: Samarsky Dom pechati. 2002. pp. 100–105. ISBN 5-7350-0350-X.
- Mordovtsev, D. L. (1889). "Последние годы иргизских раскольничьих общин" [The Final Years of the Irgiz Schismatic Communities]. Istoricheskie Propilei. 1. St. Petersburg.
- Popov, N. I. (1866). Сборник для истории старообрядчества [A Collection for the History of Old Belief]. Vol. 2, issue 4. Moscow: (Unknown).
- Yakunin, V. N. (2011). История Самарской епархии [History of the Samara Diocese]. Tolyatti: (Unknown). ISBN 978-5-9581-0235-8.
