= Pugachev (surname) =

Pugachev/Pugachyov/Pugachov (feminine:Pugacheva/Pugachyova/Pugachova) is a Russian surname, Russian: Пугачёв/Пугачёва, commonly ritten without diacritics: Russian: Пугачев/Пугачева. Notable people with the surname include:

- Alla Pugacheva (born 1949), Russian musical performer
- Gleb Pugachyov (born 2008), Russian ice hockey player
- Sergei Pugachev (born 1963), Russian politician
- Shneur Zalman Pugachov (1878–1934), Jewish Zionist educator active in Warsaw, Moscow, Berlin, and Palestine
- Viktor Pugachev (born 1948), Russian test pilot
- Yemelyan Pugachev (c. 1742–1775), leader of the Cossack insurrection in Russia
