= Pugachyov Air Base =

Russian air base

Pugachyov
- Пугачёв
- Pugachyov, Saratov Oblast in Russia
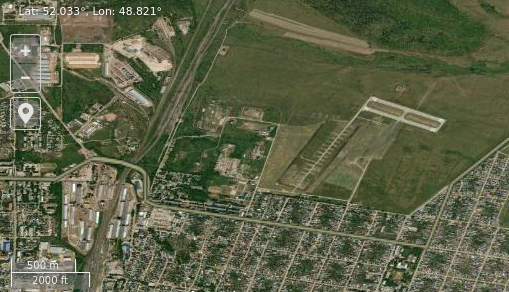
- Satellite imagery of Pugachyov air base

Site information
- Type: Air Base
- Owner: Ministry of Defence
- Operator: Russian Aerospace Forces

Location
- Shown within Saratov Oblast Pugachyov (Russia)
- Coordinates: 52°02′00″N 48°49′15″E

Site history
- Built: 1953
- In use: 1953 - present

Airfield information
- Elevation: 36 metres (118 ft) AMSL
Helipads
Number	Length and surface
11L/29R	500 metres (1,640 ft) Concrete
11R/29L	500 metres (1,640 ft) Concrete

Pugachyov (also Pugachyov Southeast) is an air base in Saratov Oblast, Russia located 2 km north of Pugachyov. It is a minor but well-maintained military airfield.

Under the Soviet Union it was a civilian airfield.

Until October 2011 it was the base of the Russian 626th helicopter regiment.

On April 14, 2016 training flights of 3rd year cadets of the branch of the Military Training and Scientific Center of the Air Force "Air Force Academy named after Professor N.E.Zhukovsky and Yu.A.Gagarin" began at Pugachevsky airfield. After saying a prayer, Archimandrite Innocent blessed the entire squadron and sprinkled holy water on each helicopter.

On December 1, 2023, based on a directive from the General Staff of the Armed Forces of the Russian Federation, the 2nd class training aviation base in Pugachev was formed with three Mi-8 helicopter training squadrons. The ceremony was attended by the head of the branch of the military training and Scientific Center of the Air Force "Air Force Academy" named after Professor N.E. Zhukovsky and Yu.A. Gagarin, Honored Pilot of Russia, Major General A.A. Asanov, Deputy Head of the Pugachevsky district Administration for Economic Development O.M. Putina, commander of the training aviation G. Pugacheva base, Colonel A.V. Natertyshev, Chairman of the Council of Veterans of the military unit of the 626th Helicopter Training Regiment, reserve Lieutenant Colonel D.I. Kyatvirtis, representatives of the district's enterprises, the public and the clergy. The event ended with a solemn military march. By striking a step and saluting, they expressed their willingness to serve the Motherland.

The base is home to the 626th Training Helicopter Regiment as part of the Zhukovsky – Gagarin Air Force Academy.

== See also ==
- List of military airbases in Russia
