= Pugachyov =

Town in Saratov Oblast, Russia

Pugachyov Пугачёв
- Town
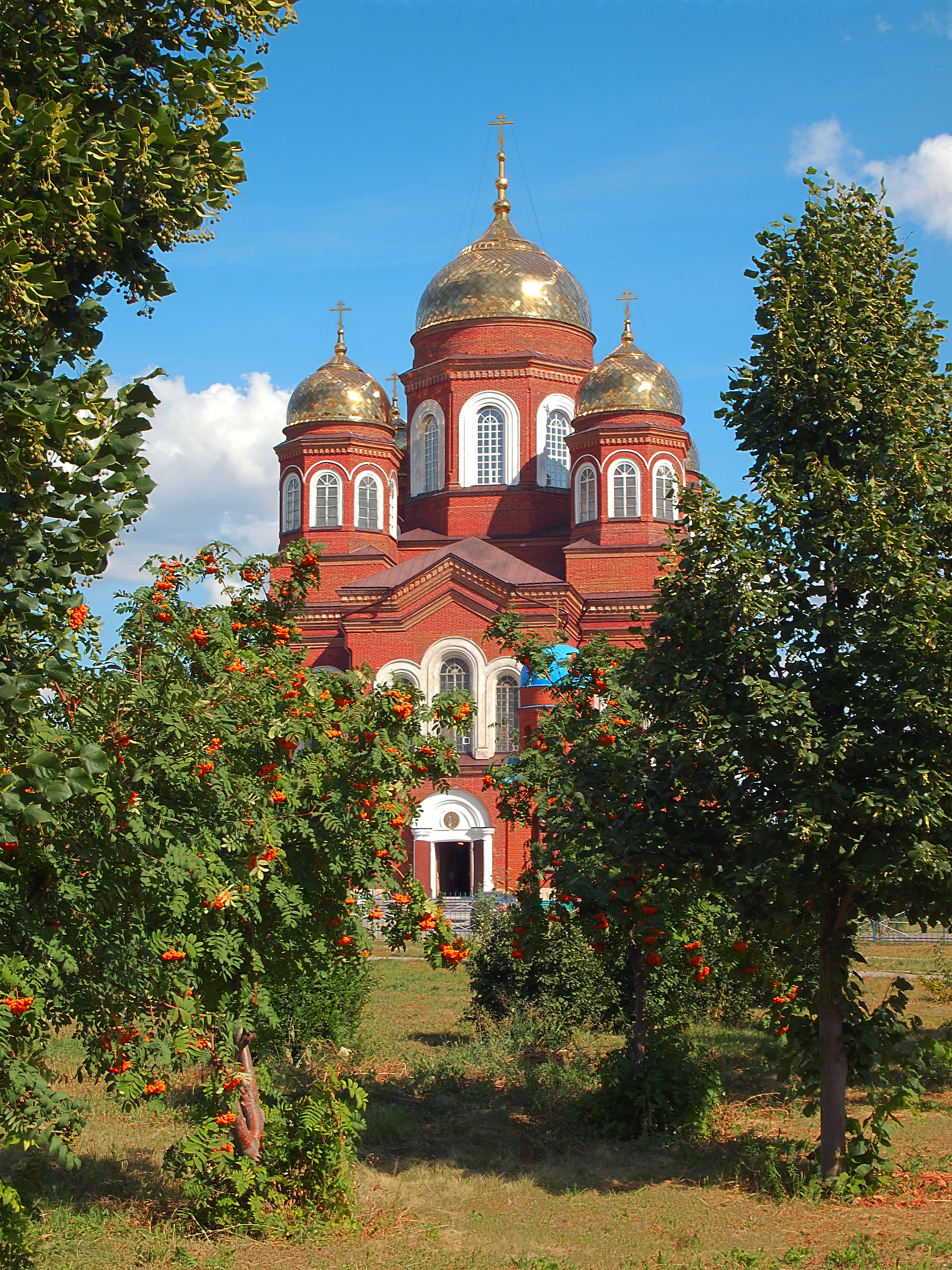
- Church of the Resurrection of Christ

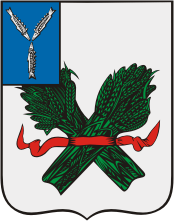
- Coat of arms
- Interactive map of Pugachyov
- Location of Pugachyov Pugachyov (Saratov Oblast)
- Coordinates: 52°01′N 48°48′E
- Country: Russia
- Federal subject: Saratov Oblast
- Founded: 1764
- Town status since: 1835
- Elevation: 40 m (130 ft)

Population (2010 Census)
  - Total: 41,707
  - Estimate (2021): 40,127 (−3.8%)

Administrative status
  - Subordinated to: Pugachyov Town Under Oblast Jurisdiction
  - Capital of: Pugachyovsky District, Pugachyov Town Under Oblast Jurisdiction

Municipal status
  - Municipal district: Pugachyovsky Municipal District
  - Urban settlement: Pugachyov Urban Settlement
  - Capital of: Pugachyovsky Municipal District, Pugachyov Urban Settlement
- Time zone: UTC+4 (MSK+1)
- Postal code: 413720–413728
- Dialing code: +7 84574
- OKTMO ID: 63637101001

Pugachyov (Russian: Пугачёв, IPA: [pʊgɐˈtɕɵf]) is a town in Saratov Oblast, Russia, located on the Bolshoy Irgiz River (Volga's tributary), 246 kilometers (153 mi) northeast of Saratov, the administrative center of the oblast. Population: 41,707 (2010 census); 41,436 (2002 census); 40,947 (1989 Soviet census).

== History ==
It was founded as the sloboda of Mechetnaya (Мечетная) in 1764 by Old Believers who returned from Poland. In 1835, it was granted town status and renamed Nikolayevsk (Никола́евск), after the Tsar Nicholas I. In 1918, it was renamed after Yemelyan Pugachev, leader of the Cossack insurrection of the 1770s.

== Administrative and municipal status ==
Within the framework of administrative divisions, Pugachyov serves as the administrative center of Pugachyovsky District, even though it is not a part of it. As an administrative division, it is incorporated separately as Pugachyov Town Under Oblast Jurisdiction—an administrative unit with the status equal to that of the districts. As a municipal division, Pugachyov Town Under Oblast Jurisdiction, together with one rural locality (the settlement of Pugachevsky) is Pugachyovsky District, is incorporated within Pugachyovsky Municipal District as Pugachyov Urban Settlement.

== Culture ==
A branch of the Central Archive of the Russian Ministry of Defense is located in the town.

== See also ==
- Pugachyov (air base)
- Upper Saviour–Transfiguration Monastery
