= Bolshoy Irgiz =

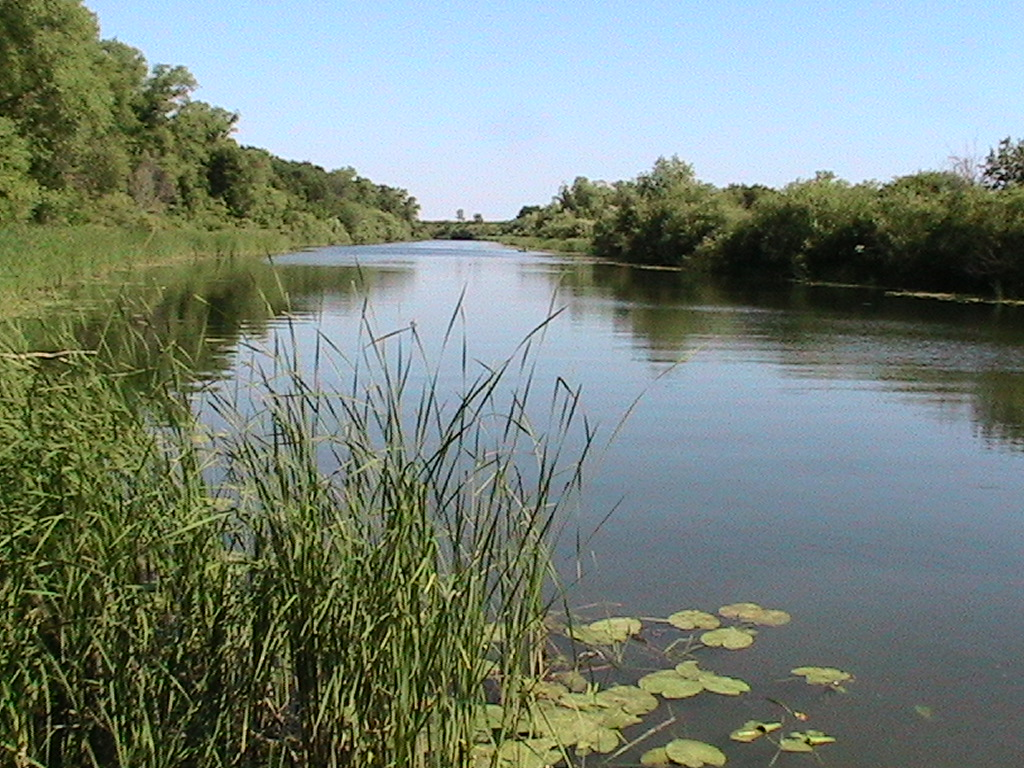

Location
- Country: Russia
- Oblasts: Samara Oblast and Saratov Oblast

Physical characteristics
- Mouth: Volga
  - location: Volgograd Reservoir near Balakovo
  - coordinates: 51°59′07″N 47°31′01″E
- Length: 675 km (419 mi)
- Basin size: 24,000 km^{2} (9,300 sq mi)

Basin features
- Progression: Volga→ Caspian Sea

The Bolshoy Irgiz (Russian: Большой Ирги́з, literally Great Irgiz) or Irgiz (Ирги́з) is a river in Samara and Saratov Oblast, Russia, a left tributary of the Volga, south of the Samara River.

== Location ==
It is 675 km (419 mi) long and the area of its drainage basin is 24,000 km^{2} (9,266 sq mi). Its headwaters are at the Obshchy Syrt adjoining the Ural River basin. It flows west and joins the Volga south of Samara. Irgiz's meandering riverbed passes the steppes. The river has snow feeding. The town of Pugachyov is located along the Irgiz. The river flows to the Volgograd Reservoir of the Volga downstream Balakovo, near Volsk.
