= Communion =

Communion may refer to:

== Religion ==
- Eucharist (also called Holy Communion or the Lord's Supper), the Christian rite involving the eating of bread and drinking of wine, reenacting the Last Supper
  - Communion (chant), the Gregorian chant that accompanies this rite
  - First Communion, a ceremony in some Christian traditions during which a person receives the Eucharist for the first time
- Koinonia (communion or fellowship), the relationship between Christians as individuals and as churches
  - Communion of Saints, a doctrine of Christianity mentioned in the Apostles' Creed
  - Full communion, recognition between churches

== Arts, entertainment, and media ==
=== Films and literature ===
- Communion (2016 film), a documentary
- Communion: the female search for love, a 2002 book by bell hooks
- Communion: Finding My Way Back to Faith, 2026 memoir by JD Vance
- Communion (Strieber book), a book by Whitley Strieber about his purported abductions by aliens
  - Communion (1989 film), a film based on the book
- Alice, Sweet Alice or Communion, a 1976 horror film starring Brooke Shields

=== Music ===
- Communion (Roy Campbell album), 1995
- Communion (John Patitucci album), 2001
- Communion (Septicflesh album), 2008
- Communion (The Soundtrack of Our Lives album), 2008
- Communion (Years & Years album), 2015
- Communion (Rabit album), 2015
- Communion (Park Jiha album), 2016
- "Communion", a 2009 album by Raffi
- "Communion", a song by Debbie Harry from Debravation
- "Communion", a song by Third Day from Wherever You Are
- "Communion", a song by Mystery Maker from Mystery Maker (1977)
- Communion Music, an artist-led music community

=== Television ===
- Communion (TV series), a 2022 Hong Kong television series

== See also ==
- Communio, a theological journal
- Unmitigated communion, focusing on others to the exclusion of self
